= Vita Sadalbergae =

Biography of Saint Sadalberga

The Vita Sadalbergae ('Life of Sadalberga') is an anonymous Latin biography and hagiography of Saint Sadalberga, founder and abbess of the Abbey of St John, Laon, probably written c. 680. The historical veracity of the Vita has been disputed, but most scholars believe it was written to demonstrate the virtues of an elite woman during the Merovingian era and to support and encourage the practice of noble families founding and financially supporting monasteries. Her biographer gave Sadalberga three obstacles: forced marriage, her family's opposition to her religious vocation, and her king's attempts to prevent her from entering the monastery. It focuses on "the question of property and prestige more comprehensively" than most other hagiographies. It also offers insight into "the rivalries of competing artistocratic factions".

== Content ==
The life story of Sadalberga, a saint and abbess and founder of the Abbey of St. John in Laon, was recounted in two sources: the vita of the Irish missionary, St. Columbanus, which was written by Jonas of Bobbio, and a vita by an anonymous writer, entitled Vita Sadalbergae (The Life of Sadalberga), probably written around 680, "some time after her death at the request of her daughter and successor, Anstrude [or Anstrudis]". Eustasius of Luxeuil, Columbanus' successor, sanctified Sadalberga as a consecrated nun when she was young, during a visit to her father's estates. Sadalberga was able to escape her family's plans, despite her sanctification and call to enter a monastery, to "force her into marriage, but only after two marriages, at her father's and the king's insistence". Her first husband died after two months of marriage, but she was forced to marry a man named Blandius. They had five children; all but the one who died in infancy entered the religious life. When her children were old enough, she persuaded her husband to "allow her to take up the monastic calling once more"; they mutually agreed to separate and enter monastic life. She performed many miracles and had many visions during her lifetime. Sadalberga had a vision that predicted her death 100 days before her death on September 22, around 665.

"Who can worthily put into words the astute nature of her holiness and sagacity, whose charity and humility governed all her subjects in wonderful sweetness and loving bounty? For she had a smiling face and lovely looks. She was swift to speak but her words were moderate, and her advice prudent. Particularly in ordering the affairs of the monastery, she was wise by nature. She loved to give alms and was never sluggish in hospitality".

— Vita Sadalbergae

== Authorship and date ==
Scholar Bruno Krusch, who edited a translation of Sadalberga's Vita, believes it is a 9th-century forgery and that her marriage and five children were invented by the anonymous author. Medieval historian Jo Ann McNamara, however, does not accept Krusch's theory because the Vita's author was a near contemporary of Sadalberga and used Jonas as a source. There are some facts to support Krusch, such as the lack of any cult developing around Sadalberga or Anstrudis. Scholar Hans Hummer has argued that it was written in the late 7th or early 8th century, within a lifetime of the events it describes.

The Vita is the only source to mention a civil war between Dagobert II (676–79) and Theuderic III (675–91). Since Sadalberga's family and its monastic foundations suffered during the war, the Vita, along with the Vita Anstrudis, may have been composed in the immediate aftermath as part of an effort to restore the reputation of both. Historian and scholar Jamie Kreiner, who calls the Vita a "superficially ... uncontroversal account", places it around 680 and states that one of the purposes of its publication was to recover her family's reputation in the period after her death.

== Analysis ==
Scholar David Hochstetler considers the Vita Sadalbergae another hagiography that demonstrated its heroine's virtues "in maintaining monastic practices while undergoing the trials of a forced marriage". Her biographer gave Sadalberga three obstacles: forced marriage, her family's opposition to her religious vocation, and her king's attempts to prevent her from entering the monastery. Hochstetler believes that "the real Sadalberga" never married, but unlike Kresch, Hochstetler maintains that instead of using his version of the story to expand it, her biographer used it to illustrate the difference between secular and monastic definitions of success and to demonstrate that the vocation of marriage and family was an imperfect one, especially when compared with the monastic life.

Scholar Yaniv Fox considers Sadalberga's life, as recounted in Columbanus' hagiography, an example of "the desired path that should be taken by a high-born woman within the Columbanian network". According to Kreiner, her Vita was more than "merely a set of suggestions for how to be an elite woman or nun", but "offered a calculated vision of the Merovingian kingdom". Her biographer uses her religious practices, such as humility, generosity, and prayer, which were expected of "any Christian in Gaul at the time", as well as "so clearly confirming to that template", as a defense of her status as a saint. He praised and compared her choices to those of other saints, like the way in which Saint Jerome had praised Saints Paula and Melania, and how Eusebius praised Saint Helena, and even compared her to Abraham in the Bible. He argued that her humility was a kind of lawlessness when she worked in the monastery's kitchen, which went against the monastic rule forbidding the abbess from performing chores. Kreiner states that the Vita's author defended Sadalberga's choices and behaviors because, although the Vita seems straightforward, "it makes several large-scale claims that would have surprised and sometimes unsettled other subjects, including Christians, in the Merovingian kingdom". It suggests that "elite families should reconsider their commitments to their bloodlines, their family fortunes, and their connections to the court". The biographer also suggests that founding and supporting monasteries was a way to generate profit, political capital, and a long-term legacy. The Vita also stressed that the deathbed was "the best time to help the soul toward salvation, as a way of regaining control of a life that had inevitably been difficult to control", also a controversial belief in the Merovingian era.

Fox discusses the Vita in a chapter about life during the Merovingian era (c. 481–751) in his 2014 book Power and Religion in Merovingian Gaul: Columbanian Monasticism and the Formation of the Frankish Aristocracy, when proprietary concerns were an important part of monastic patronage. Kreiner states that the Vita Sadalbergae focuses on "the question of property and prestige more comprehensively" than most other hagiographies. Unlike most hagiographies, which focus on profiling the protagonist, Sadalberga's family and status are central to the conflict in her Vita, which describes how she dealt with land disputes with her family and with the management of the lands they donated. As Kreiner states, an elite woman's decision to found a monastery "had profound effects on her family and their property holdings". McNamara states that Sadalberga's role in family politics, like other women of her time and status, was "firmly entrenched in the dynamic system of the seventh century". McNamara does not consider Sandalberga a helpless victim like other women had been in the past; rather, by the seventh century, old legal restrictions on female inheritance had been removed. As McNamara put it, "Dagobert's attempt to force Sadalberga and other female saints of his circle into marriage should not be dismissed as literary romance". She considers the attempt as the king's "obvious strategy" to gain control over the aristocrats he ruled and to prevent alliances harmful to him, adding, "The nobility's willingness to allow their women to choose a religious life should also be seen as a means of using their human capital to best advantage".

Fox states that her Vita offered insight into "the rivalries of competing artistocratic factions". For example, after Sadalberga had a vision, the monastery she and her husband founded in c. 639 was relocated from near the Austrasian border to Laon, France, in the north. The Vita never explains the reason for the relocation, but Fox, who calls it a "curious move", gives several explanations. He speculates that because the original monastery was on the border, it might have been at the center of "a contested region", adding that "it has been suggested that the hostilities prophesied by Sadalberger are an echo" of the politics of the time. The Vita states that the new site "had strong natural defenses and was safer than the first convent". Fox states that most historians agree that Saldalberga felt the monastery was at risk for being drawn into a regional conflict for control among "warring aristocratic factions", which would have affected its well-being. The monastery eventually became the Abbey of St. John (Saint-Jean-de-Laon); the Vita claims that it housed over 300 nuns and was one of the most important monasteries in the region. According to Fox, "It is remarkable to see to what extent monasteries played in the violent factional politics of late Merovingian Franca". Fox also states that when young women like Sadalberger chose the monastic life, they were serving the interests of their families, adding, "Refusal of marriage was only a topos deployed by the authors of Vitae to exalt virginity, hence to enhance the sacredness of what were in fact joint-foundations of father and daughter".

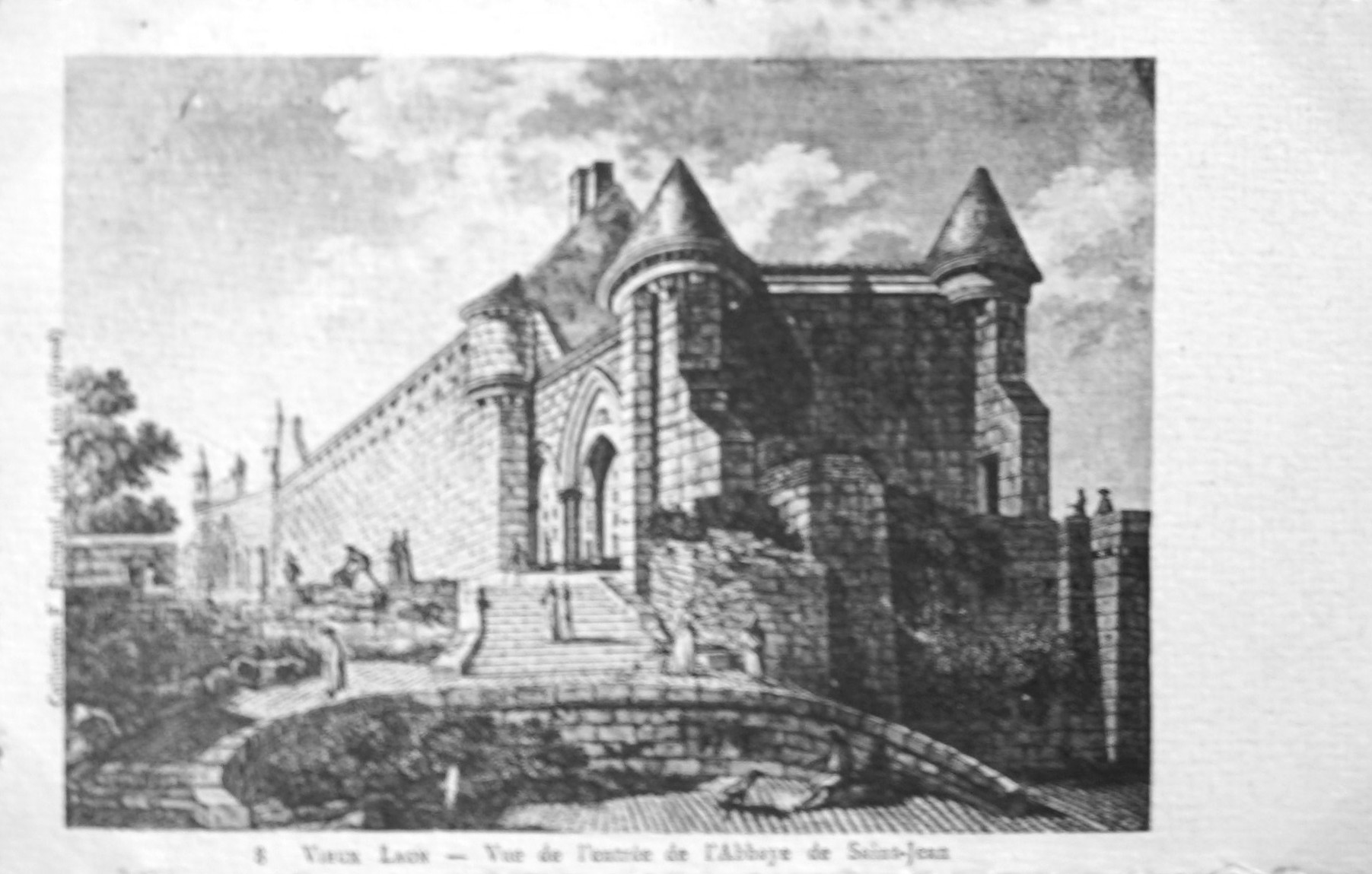
Abbey of St. John, Laon

Fox compares Vita Sadalbergae to the hagiography of Saint Burgundofara, written by Jonas of Bobbio, a contemporary of Sadalberga. As Fox put it, the parallels between the two stories "are simply too obvious to be overlooked". In Jonas' account of Burgundofara, her family was visited at their home by the Irish missionary, Columbanus, who consecrated her at a young age, as Sadalberga was consecrated by Eustasius. The Vita's account is more detailed than Jonas' because its goal was to create a long-standing tradition, starting during the abbacy of Eustasius, of her family's association with Columbanian circles. Fox conjectures that the author of Sadalberga's Vita was influenced by Burgundofara's vita, since both women were helped by the goodwill and advice of an abbot from Luxeuil, and both women's fathers obstructed the fulfillment of their religious goals. They were both affected by blindness and healed by a visiting saint. Fox believes that all similarities in their stories, including the early visit and blessing, the support by Eustasius and Columbanus, the opposition by their families and governments, and their blindness, were more than a coincidence, and that the writer of Sadalberga's Vita altered her story to strengthen the connection and to make it more legitimate.

== Editions ==
- Bruno Krusch, ed. "Vita Sadalbergae abbatissae Laudunensis", in Monumenta Germaniae Historicae, Scriptores rerum Merovingicarum, 5 (Hanover: Hahn, 1910), pp. 40–66.
- Translated in Jo Ann McNamara, John E. Halborg, E. Gordon Whatley, eds. Sainted Women of the Dark Ages (Duke University Press, 1992), pp. 178–194.

== Works cited ==
- Fox, Yaniv (2014). Power and Religion in Merovingian Gaul: Columbanian Monasticism and the Formation of the Frankish Aristocracy. Cambridge, U.K.: Cambridge University Press. ISBN 978-1-107-06459-1.
- Hochstetler, David (1992). A Conflict of Traditions: Women in Religion in the Early Middle Ages 500-840. Lanham, Maryland: University Press. ISBN 0-8191-8609-0.
- Kreiner, Jamie (2014). The Social Life of Hagiography in the Merovingian Kingdom. Cambridge, Massachusetts: Cambridge University Press. p. 189. ISBN 978-1-107-27960-5.
- Kreiner, Jamie (2020). "Merovingian Hagiography". In Effros, Bonnie; Moreira, Isabel (eds.). The Oxford Handbook of the Merovingian World. New York: Oxford University Press. pp. 508–530. ISBN 9780190234188.
- McNamara, Jo Ann; Halborg, John E.; Whatley, E. Gordon (1996). "Sadalberga, Abbess of Leon". In McNamara, Jo Ann; Halborg, John E.; Whatley, E. Gordon (eds.). Sainted Women of the Dark Ages. Duke University Press. pp. 176–194. ISBN 0-8223-1200-X.
