= Chagnoald =

Frankish bishop

Chagnoald (Cagnoald, Cagnou) (died 633 AD) was a Frankish bishop of Laon during the 7th century. The family to which Chagnoald belonged is known as the Faronids, named after his brother Saint Faro, who was bishop of Meaux, while his sister was Saint Burgundofara, who founded the convent of Faremoûtiers. They were the children of the chancellor to Dagobert I, Chagneric.

== History ==
The Faronids were originally from Burgundy, but had settled near Meaux. Chagnoald became a monk at Luxeuil. Columban's biographer, Jonas, recounts how

"Columban once withdrew to the forest in order to fast and pray. The food ran out and all he and the young monk Chagnoald had to eat were crab apples. However, when Chagnoald went to collect the apples he found a hungry bear eating them. He returned to Columban for directions. Columban ordered him to go back to the orchard and to divide it in two halves, one for the bear and one for the monks."

When Eustace of Luxeuil went to visit Chlothar II, he left Chagnoald in charge at Luxeuil. Eustace also assigned Waldebert and Chagnoald to instruct the nuns at Burgundofara's double monastery at Faremoutiers in the rule Waldebert drafted for them.

Chagnoald was later ordained bishop of Laon. In that position, he once angered the king, Theuderic II, by criticizing him for his immoral conduct. In response Theuderic exiled Chagnoald from his territories in 610. Chagnoald left his see, finding refuge in the territory of the king's brother Theudebert II, and worked with Columbanus as a missionary in the area of Lake Constance. Columbanus later chastised Chagnoald for suggesting they should pray for the victory of Theudebert, rather than for their enemies.

Theuderic later gained control of this territory as well. Columbanus was banished, and left for Rome, with Chagnoald accompanying him. On the death of Columbanus, Chagnoald returned to his old diocese, and resumed his duties as bishop. He participated in the Council of Reims in 630.

He is venerated as a saint, with a feast day of September 6.
