= Sadalberga =

French saint from 7th century

Saint Sadalberga

Abbess and foundress
- Born: early 7th century outside Langres, France
- Died: 655; Laon, France
- Venerated in: Roman Catholic Church; Eastern Orthodox Church
- Feast: 22 September

Sadalberga (early 7th century – 22 September 655) was a French abbess, and saint. She came from a noble family during the reigns of Chlothar II and Dagobert I. Her life story was recounted in two sources: in the vita of the Irish missionary, St. Columbanus, written by Jonas of Bobbio, and a vita by an anonymous writer (680), entitled Vita Sadalbergae (The Life of Sadalberga). She was sanctified as a nun at a young age. She was able to escape her family's plans to "force her into marriage, but only after two marriages, at her father's and the king's insistence". Her first husband died after two months of marriage; she remained a consecrated widow for two more years before marrying a man named Blandius. They had five children, all of whom entered the religious life, including her daughter, Saint Anstrudis, who succeeded her as the abbess of the Abbey of St. John in Laon, a double monastery that Sadalberga founded, with funds from her inheritance. When her children were old enough, she persuaded her husband to "allow her to take up the monastic calling once more"; They mutually agreed to separate and enter monastic life. According to her vita, she performed many miracles and had many visions during her lifetime.

Also according to her vita, Sadalberga had a vision that predicted her death 100 days before her death on 22 September 655. She died after the fate of her abbey and properties was secured.

== Early life ==
Sadalberga was born in the early 7th century in a village outside Langres in northeastern France, where many of her father's lands were located, to a noble family. She lived during the reigns of the Frankish kings Chlothar II and Dagobert I, during "an age of increasing self-confidence and importance". She was a contemporary of Saint Burgundofara. Like Burgundofara, Sadalberga came from "a family of aristocratic patrons involved in the evangelization of the Frankish countryside through the Irish monastic system". Her father was Gundoin, who was the duke of Alsace and close counselor of Dagobert I, and her mother was Saretude. Her brothers were Leuduin and Fulculf. Leuduin married a Frankish woman from a prominent family named Odila, had one child, and became bishop of Toul in the 660s. She convinced him to join the monastery and to "endow it with what must have been a sizable pool of landed wealth". He was an important figure in local ecclesiastical politics and later founded Bonmoutier Monastery at the request of his daughter, Teutberga, who was placed there as abbess. There is little known about Sadalberga's two sisters, Aba (or Ebana) and Saretrude, but they probably married and had children. Saretrude was named after her maternal grandmother, which, as historian Yaniv Fox states, suggests that "familial continuity with the maternal line was significant" during the era.

Sadalberga's life story was recounted in two sources: in the vita of the Irish missionary, St. Columbanus, which was written by Jonas of Bobbio, and a vita by an anonymous writer, entitled Vita Sadalbergae (The Life of Sadalberga), written around 680 at the request of Sadalberga's daughter and successor, Anstrudis. According to Jonas of Bobbio, Columbanus' successor, Eustasius of Luxuil, was sent to Germany from the Luxeuil Abbey to correct a heresy that denied the divinity of Christ; on his way back to France, he met Gundoin, who was staying in a villa near the river Meuse. Gundoin welcomed Eustasius to his home. Eustasius asked to meet his children, and he introduced his two sons. When Eustasius asked if he had another child, he confessed that he also had a daughter, Sadalberga, who was blind. He "discerned sanctity" in Sadalberga and asked if she was interested in entering the religious life; she told him she was, even though she was young. According to her vita, Eustasius healed her blindness by pouring benediction oil into her eyes after he had fasted for two days. The vita also states that he healed Sadalberga of "a flow of blood," which had caused weakness in her body.

== Career ==
As the historian, David Hochstetler, put it, Sadalberga concluded that the Christian practices she wanted to perform could only be accomplished in a monastery. She was able to, as Fox put it, escape her family's plans to "force her into marriage, but only after two marriages, at her father's and the king's insistence". When she reached maturity, despite her consecration by Eustasius, her parents forced her to marry Richramnus, whom her biographer called "a certain mighty man of noble birth" and "a morally excellent man". Two months later, he died. As her biographer stated, Sadalberga did not give up on her goal of going into the monastery and lived in her home as a consecrated widow. She was dissatisfied with that choice, so she joined the double monastery at Remiremont. Dagobert I opposed it and had her removed; she was forced to marry another powerful nobleman, Blandius. Hochstelter reports that her status as a noble widow gave her the power to appeal directly to the king for permission to enter a monastery, rather than consulting her bishop. Hochstelter states that, as a marriageable woman of the high nobility, Sadalberga had to "apply to the king for permission to remove herself from the world forever" and that "she had gone too far". He claimed that her father forcibly removed her from the monastery and that Blandius, whom he called "a wily courtier, a royal favorite," counseled the king not to allow her to remove herself from society and forced her to marry him. According to her vita, though, "they both performed Christian works and most devoutly kept themselves in baptismal purity", practicing hospitality, almsgiving, and standing as a sponsor for candidates for baptism. Her biographer also reports that she traveled to the basilica of Saint Remigius and prayed for children, committing them to religious life. They had five children: Saretude, named after Sadalberga's mother; two more daughters, Ebana and Anstrudis (who became a saint); a boy named Eustasius, who died in infancy; and her youngest son, Baldwin, who also became a saint. According to Fox, Eustasius, whom he called "sickly", was named after her supporter and spiritual guide. Fox also finds it odd that her oldest son would not have a familial name, as Baldwin did, especially since the purpose of her marriage was to produce a male heir.

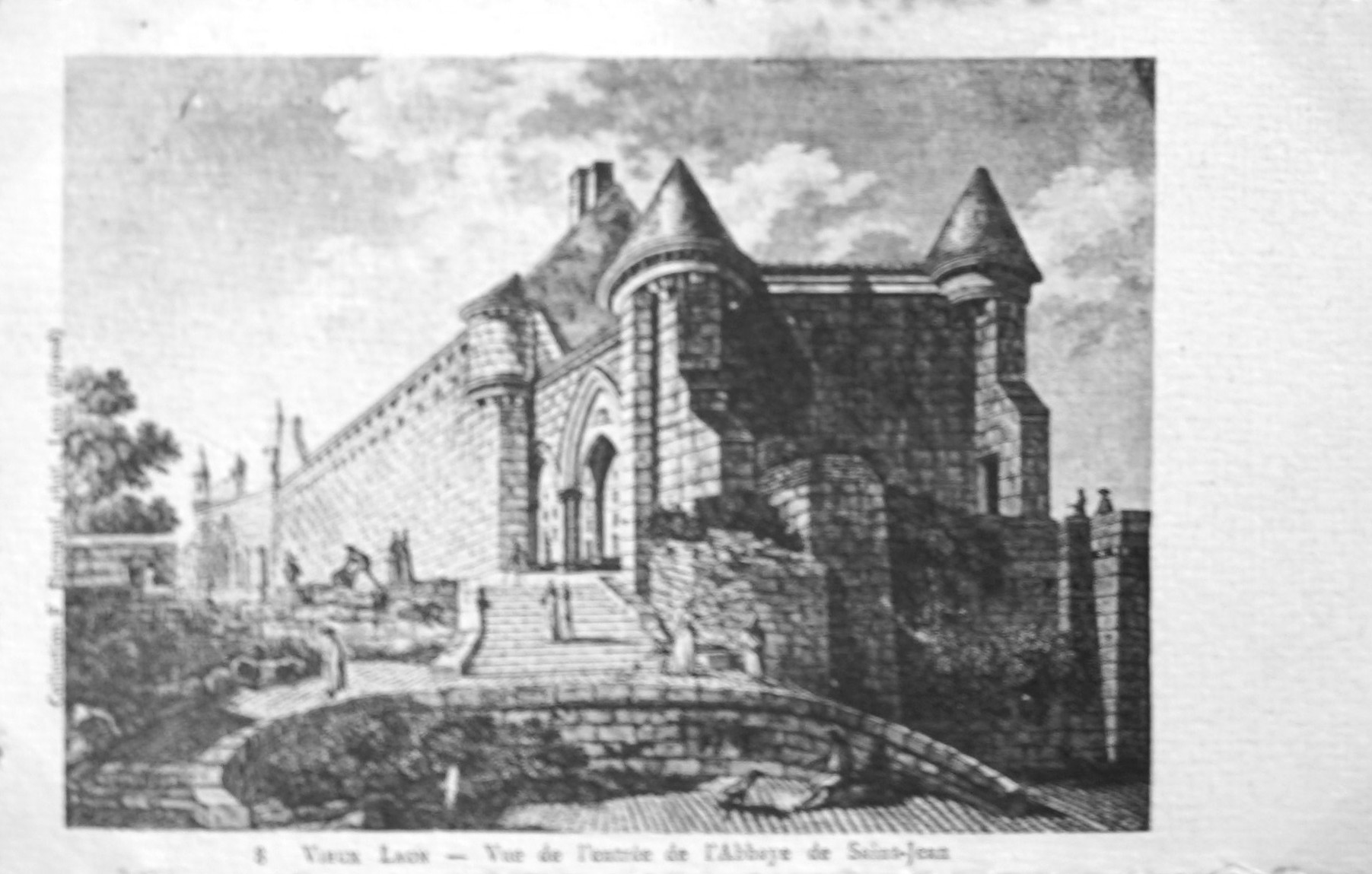
Abbey of St. John, Laon (Saint-Jean-de-Laon), 1800s

According to Fox, when the couple's children were old enough, and her oldest son had matured, Sadalberga persuaded her husband "to allow her to take up the monastic calling once more"; they mutually agreed to separate and enter monastic life. He became an anchorite. He also joined her in establishing a monastery, close to the Austrasian border but within Burgundy, on lands she had inherited from her father. According to Fox, the monastery was almost complete when Sadalberga received a vision warning her of imminent danger, so she relocated it in c. 639 to Laon, France, in the north. The new monastery was called the Abbey of St. John (Saint-Jean-de-Laon). Fox speculates that because the original monastery was on the border, it might have been at the center of a politically-contested region. Her vita states that the new site "had strong natural defenses and was safer than the first convent". Fox states that most historians agree that Sadalberga felt the monastery was at risk for being drawn into a regional conflict for control among "warring aristocratic factions", which would have affected its well-being. Sadalberga's vita claimed that the Abbey of St. John housed 300 nuns, including over 100 women from the nobility and "from her own service". One of the noble women who resided at the Laon convent was Odila, a Sicambrian who was married to Sadalberga's brother, Leudinus; they donated funds to the convent, and he eventually became bishop of Toul. Odila entered the convent after Leudinus died and lived there until her own death. According to her vita, Sadalberga "personally did everything that might be useful to the convent", including cooking meals weekly and conducting other tasks necessary for the upkeep of a monastery.

Sadalberga's vita states that she performed many miracles during her lifetime. Scholar Jamie Kreiner, however, states that her biographer uses her religious practices, such as humility, generosity, and prayer, which were normal for any believer at the time, to defend her recognition as a saint. Her vita reports that she healed a nun from epilepsy after the nun had an episode during vespers. Her friend and supporter, Saint Waldebert, was expected to visit St. John Abbey. They were out of wine, so Sadalberga ordered beer, and when it was discovered that they did not have enough, she prayed that they would have enough beer, and her prayers were answered. Her vita reports that the abbey was miraculously saved from a fire through her prayers. Also according to her vita, a voice told the archbishop, Basinus, to visit the abbey and watch Sadalberga cook a meal, which she did once per week. After the message was repeated three times, he went to the convent, arriving at the same time as a man carrying a large fish to sell to the abbey. Basinus bought it, providing food for the sisters. Fox reports that "Sadalberga, we are told, was able to order lettuce from her gardener by telepathy". He found this incident interesting because it occurred "while on a summer stroll outside the monastic enclosure and beyond the city walls", and was told as if leaving the abbey grounds was a normal practice. Kreiner calls this miracle one of her "most bizarre" and states that a monk heard her "scold him for stealing lettuce from the nuns' garden, despite the fact that Sadalberga was a half mile away and had only mouthed the words". Sadalberga's vita also reported that she had many visions.

== Death ==
According to Sadalberga's vita, a year and a half before her death, she suffered from a serious illness and the loss of speech. When the other nuns asked her how she had recovered, she told them that she had experienced a vision after she began to improve, in which she sprouted wings and began to fly; she believed that the wings protected her from getting any worse. She remained free from any future attacks until she died at the Abbey of St. John on 22 September, c. 665. She experienced a vision that foretold her impending death in 100 days; the other nuns were summoned and told to complete the psalter during that time. Her biographer stated that Sadalberga "began that day to worship the Lord more fully in vigils, fasting, psalms and prayers, with a firmer devotion and swifter service". According to Sadalberga's vita, as she was close to death, she became aware that her brother Fulculf was illegally holding properties she had intended to endow her abbey with. According to Fox, Fulculf "took issue with Sadalberga's management of the monastic estate, blaming her for dishonorably appropriating some of the familial resources for her nunnery". He was pacified when his stake in the monastery and other landholdings was formally recognized. Her vita alleges that it was not until Sadalberga became ill that Fulculf decided to meet with her and reconcile their differences. The vita also reports that Sadalberga's other brother, Leudinus, left the family estates he was managing when he heard of her impending death, and promised her that the convent would remain in existence.

According to her vita, Sadalberga collapsed 20 days before her death and became bedridden. She received the Last Rites from the priest, Italus. She was buried in the main monastery church at the Abbey of St. John in Laon. After she died, Sadalberga passed the abbey to her daughter, Anstrude. According to Fox, Anstrude was not raised by her parents, but by "more distant kin" who tried to marry her off, but she insisted on entering the monastery her mother founded. She succeeded her mother as abbess, which allowed her to keep her inheritance intact and to combine it with the "vast estates of the monastery over which she assumed control as abbess".

== Works cited ==
- Fox, Yaniv (2014). Power and Religion in Merovingian Gaul: Columbanian Monasticism and the Formation of the Frankish Aristocracy. Cambridge, U.K.: Cambridge University Press. ISBN 978-1-107-06459-1.
- Hochstetler, David (1992). A Conflict of Traditions: Women in Religion in the Early Middle Ages 500-840. Lanham, Maryland: University Press. ISBN 0-8191-8609-0.
- Kreiner, Jamie (2020). "Merovingian Hagiography". In Effros, Bonnie; Moreira, Isabel (eds.). The Oxford Handbook of the Merovingian World. New York: Oxford University Press. pp. 508–530. ISBN 9780190234188.
- Le Jan, Régine (2001). "Convents, Violence, and Competition for Power in Seventh-Century Francia". In de Jong, Mayke; Theuws, Frans (eds.). Topographies of Power in the Early Middle Ages. Leiden, Netherlands: Brill. pp. 243–269. ISBN 90-04-11734-2.
- McNamara, Jo Ann; Halborg, John E.; Whatley, E. Gordon (1996). "Sadalberga, Abbess of Leon". In McNamara, Jo Ann; Halborg, John E.; Whatley, E. Gordon (eds.). Sainted Women of the Dark Ages. Duke University Press. pp. 176–194. ISBN 0-8223-1200-X.
