= Vita Anstrudis =

The Vita Anstrudis abbatissae Laudunensis is an anonymous Latin biography and hagiography of Saint Anstrudis, (c. 645-c. 709), abbess of the Abbey of St John, Laon, written in the 9th century. It was edited by scholar Bruno Krusch, who also edited the Vita Sadalbergae, the hagiography of Sadalberga, Anstrudis' mother, who was also a saint and abbess. It was written shortly after her mother's vita and is considered its sequel. The historical veracity of the Vita has been disputed, but most scholars believe it is authentic. The Vita was probably not written for Anstrudis' family or was "a platform for family propaganda", but rather was a "more locally focused composition" and described some of the political intrigue happening at the time, which reflected the interests of the monastery, and probably reflects the writer's priorities.

== Content ==
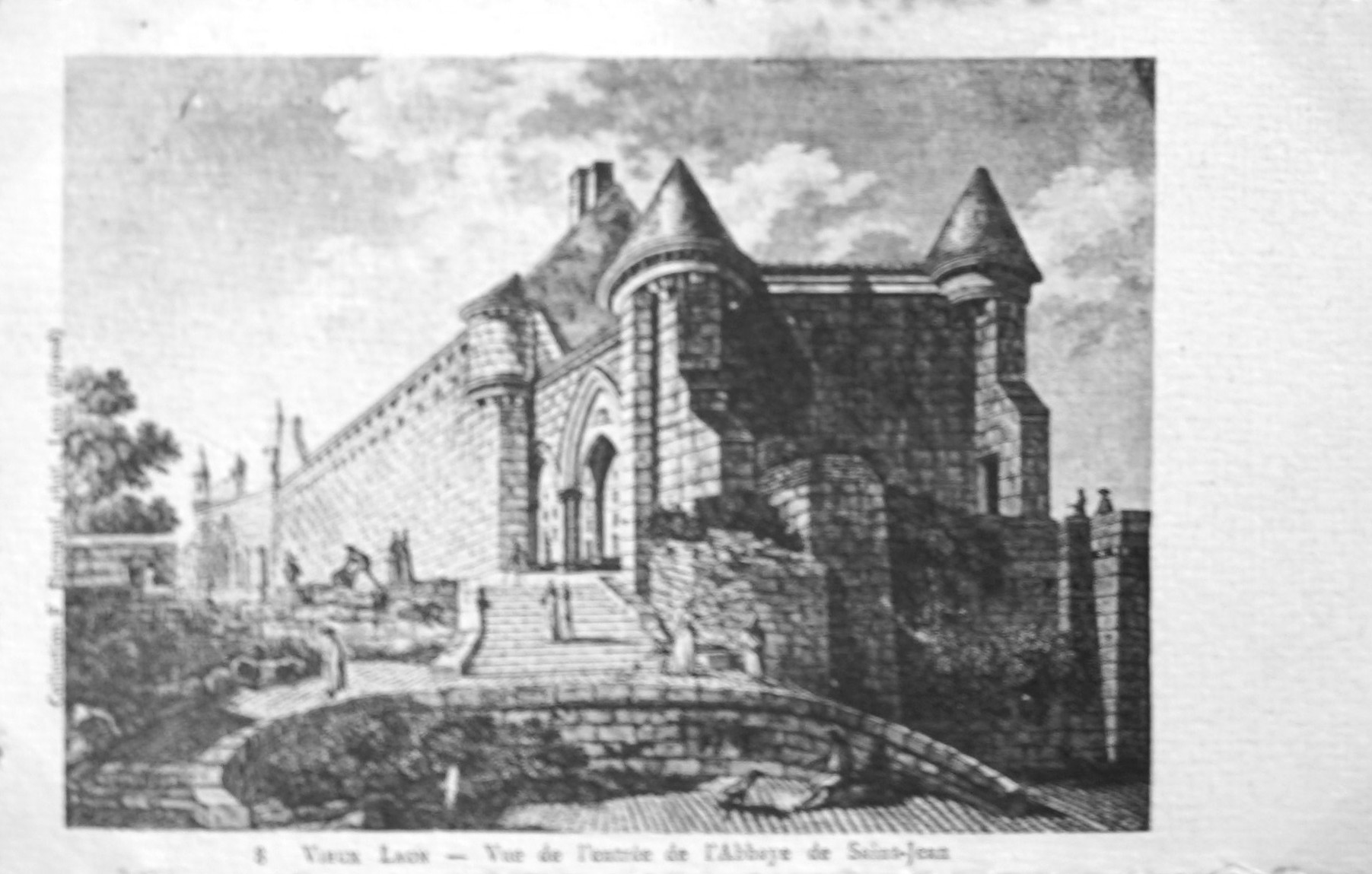
Abbey of St. John, Laon

The biography of Anstrudis, 7th-century saint and abbess, was recounted in her hagiography, Vita Anstrudis abbatissae Laudunensis, written in the 9th century by an anonymous author. It was edited by scholar Bruno Krusch, who also edited the Vita Sadalbergae, the hagiography of Sadalberga, Anstrudis' mother, who was also a saint and abbess. Sadalberga traveled to the basilica of Saint Remigius and prayed for children, committing them to the religious life. Anstrudis was consecrated at a young age to enter a monastery; she entered her mother's monastery, the Abbey of St. John in Laon, at the age of 12 to avoid a forced marriage, and succeeded her mother as abbess after Sadalberga died in 670.

Vita Anstrudis describes, in great detail, Anstrudis' religious practices. It states, "She made every effort to subject herself to all the Lord's precepts so that in no moment of any hour might she be found without some divine work". It also describes the miracles she performed both before and after her death. It recounts the many challenges she faced during her abbacy, especially a power struggle between the Pippinids and their adversaries, the Neustrians. In about 679, Anstrudis' brother Baldwin, who also became a saint, was ambushed by two men. She blamed herself for his death because she sent Baldwin to negotiate with his murderers, comparing her grief to that of Job in the Bible. The incident occupied the first half of the Vita, including two pages describing her grief.

Anstrudis died in 688. The Vita describes the miracles and healings surrounding her death, as well as the reactions of the sisters of the Abbey of St. John.

== Analysis ==
Krusch questions that Anstrudis was Sadalberga's daughter and considers her Vita worthless, even though daughters succeeding their mothers as abbesses was an established practice at the time. Wilheim Levinson, the editor of the translation, disagrees, stating that it "does not challenge the basic outlines of her story", and Fox states that "more recent scholarship has sought to rehabilitate the Vita Anstrudis". The Vita was probably based on an earlier hagiography written by someone at the Laon monastery, shortly after Anstrudis' death, and later expanded and improved. Levinson suspects that its historical content may have been drawn from other works to defend the monastery's privileges against Carolingian bishops. Fox states, "When stripped bare of literary decorations, the narrative skeleton of the Vita Anstrudis is remarkably thin". It briefly discusses Anstrudis' infancy, adolescence, and refusal to marry, a common theme in hagiographies about women. More emphasis is placed on the murder of her brother, Baldwin, done in order to highlight her "virile attitude and saintliness", rather than the incident's familial or political context. Fox considers the Vita Anstrudis a sequel to the Vita Sadalbergae. Anstrudis' vita begins soon after Sadalberga's ends and has many of the same characters.

Fox does not consider the Vita written for Anstrudis' family or was "a platform for family propaganda", but rather was a "more locally focused composition" that reflected the interests of the monastery and probably reflects the writer's priorities. For example, Sadalberga is mentioned twice, and only briefly. Fox agrees, stating that while the Vita was probably written shortly after the events it describes, "the heavy hand of the later editor is more than apparent", adding that Anstrudis' "piety, humility and spiritual formation are reiterated ad tedium at the expense of the factual segment, which remains remarkably slim". Fox also states that, unlike the Vita Sadalbergae, the Vita Anstrudis did not emphasize their family or its connection to royalty, so its writer chose a different focus, the Laon monastery's legal status in subsequent generations. McNamara stated that there was nothing in the Vita Anstrudis "that would outrage the credulity of her seventh-century contemporaries".

== Editions ==
- Bruno Krusch, ed. Vita Anstrudis abbatissae Laudunensis, in Monumenta Germaniae Historicae, Scriptores rerum Merovingicarum, 6 (Hanover: Hahn, 1813), pp. 66–78.
- Translated in Jo Ann McNamara, John E. Halborg, E. Gordon Whatley, eds. Sainted Women of the Dark Ages (Duke University Press, 1992), pp. 178–194.

== Works cited ==
- Fox, Yaniv (2014). Power and Religion in Merovingian Gaul: Columbanian Monasticism and the Formation of the Frankish Aristocracy. Cambridge, U.K.: Cambridge University Press. ISBN 978-1-107-06459-1.
- Le Jan, Régine (2001). "Convents, Violence, and Competition for Power in Seventh-Century Francia". In de Jong, Mayke; Theuws, Frans (eds.). Topographies of Power in the Early Middle Ages. Leiden, Netherlands: Brill. pp. 243–269. ISBN 90-04-11734-2.
- McNamara, Jo Ann; Halborg, John E.; Whatley, E. Gordon (1996a). "Anstrude, Abbess of Leon". In McNamara, Jo Ann; Halborg, John E.; Whatley, E. Gordon (eds.). Sainted Women of the Dark Ages. Duke University Press. pp. 289–303. ISBN 0-8223-1200-X.
- McNamara, Jo Ann; Halborg, John E.; Whatley, E. Gordon (1996b). "Sadalberga, Abbess of Leon". In McNamara, Jo Ann; Halborg, John E.; Whatley, E. Gordon (eds.). Sainted Women of the Dark Ages. Duke University Press. pp. 176–194. ISBN 0-8223-1200-X.
