= Madeleine de Choiseul =

German-Roman monarch

Madeleine de Choiseul (Ipa:Madˈəlˈɛn də ʃwaˈzoel) (1500–1578), was a German-Roman vassal as Princess Abbess of the Imperial Remiremont Abbey in France. She was abbess twice, in 1520 and in 1544. She took over upon the death of Alix de Choiseul's death in 1520, who had fulfilled the role from 1507 to 1520. Upon her appointment, it is said that she was not revered by her other Ladies.

== Appointment to Abbey ==
After Madeleine's tenure was over, she was succeeded by Princess-Abbess Nicole de Dommartin of Remiremont, although her position was not completed as her appointment was reviled by Marguerite de Neufchâtel. Because of this, Nicole was soon replaced by Marguerite de Haraucourt, but this was also not to be. Under the German-Roman Princess-Abbess Marguerite III de Neufchâtel of Remiremont, Madeleine was quickly appointed as coadjutrix. She would only hold this appointment for a few months before being replaced with Madame de Haraucourt.

There are two different timelines for the Princess Abbess. One Madeleine died on January 15, 1578, in Paris at the age of 77 and was buried in Paris. The other, more probably, Madeline died in 1549 after having served as the Princess Abbess for 2 years. This is also contested, as she is recorded as having her second appointment in 1544.

== Date discrepancies ==
Some sources purport that she was born in the 16th century around the beginning of the century, while others state that she was born in the century following in 1600. The ruling consensus was that she was a Monarch and Princess Abbess in the 16th century. Her appointment to Princess Abbess is also contested and there are differences in the dates that are recorded.
