= Alix de Choiseul =

German-Roman monarch

Alix de Choiseul (died 1520), also called Aleidis, was a German-Roman monarch as Princess Abbess of the Imperial Remiremont Abbey in France. She was abbess from 1507 until 1520. She resigned in favor of Madeleine de Choiseul shortly before her death.
