= Romaric =

Frankish nobleman

Saint Romaric
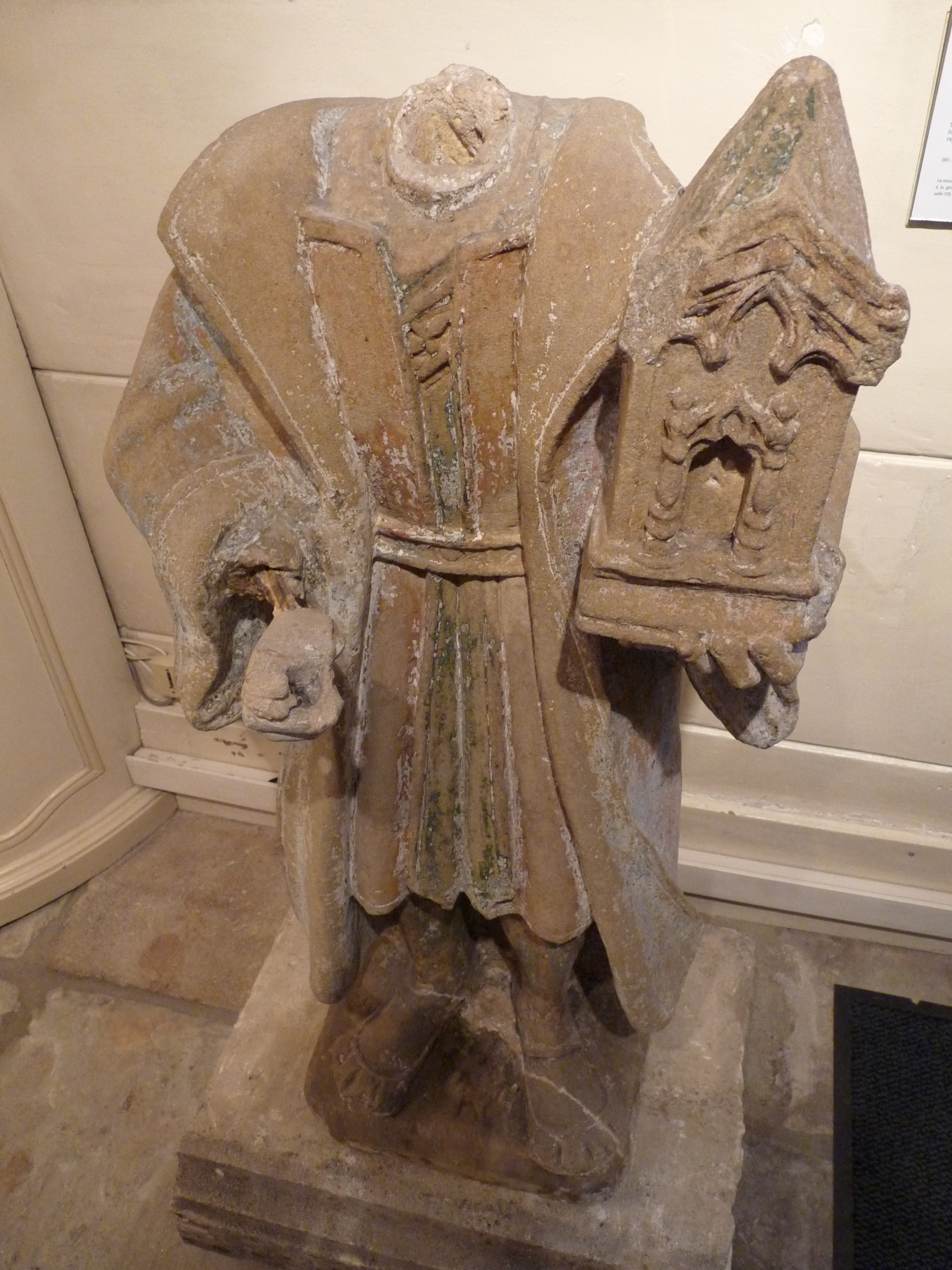
- Statue of Romaric at the Musée Charles de Bruyères in Remiremont, France
- Died: 653; Remiremont Abbey, Vosges
- Venerated in: Eastern Orthodox Church; Roman Catholicism
- Canonized: 3 December 1049 by Pope Leo IX
- Influences: Amatus of Grenoble

Saint Romaric (died 653 AD) was a Frankish nobleman who lived in Austrasia from the late 6th century until the middle of the 7th century. He and Amatus of Grenoble founded Remiremont Abbey.

== Biography ==
He was a former Count Palatine in the court of the Merovingian king, Theodebert II. His parents were killed by Queen Brunhilda, and because of the enmity of his family with this queen, he wandered without a home. However, with the fall of the Queen, he was received at the court of Chlothar II and his lands restored.

Disenchanted with life as a courtier, Romaric experienced a religious conversion through the missionary efforts of Amatus of Grenoble, a monk of Luxeuil Abbey. Romaric entered Luxeuil and trained to be a monk. With the approval of Abbot Eustace, Romaric and Amatus founded a double monastery for men and women, later given the name of Remiremont (Romariki Mons). The monastery was built on land belonging to St. Romaric, when he was a count palatine. One of the earlier monks in Remiremont was St. Romaric's friend St. Arnulf.

Around 625 Romaric succeeded Amatus as abbot. He directed several members of his family who embraced religious life there: two of his daughters, Ozeltruda and Zeberga, his granddaughter Gebetruda, and his grandson Adelphus.

Romaric died in 653.

Romaric is recognized as a saint of the Roman Catholic Church, with a feast day on December 10 or December 8. He was canonized on 3 December 1049 by Pope Leo IX.

== Sources ==
- Alban Butler's lives of the saints, edited, revised and supplemented by Thurston and Attwater. Christian Classics, Westminster, Maryland.
