= Saint Faro =

French saint and bishop

Bishop of Meaux
- Born: Duchy of Burgundy
- Died: 675
- Honoured in: Catholic Church, Eastern Orthodox Church
- Major shrine: Meaux Cathedral

Faro (or Burgundofaro; died c. 675 AD), Count of Guînes, was bishop of Meaux. The family to which Faro belonged is known as the Faronids and is named after him.

He is canonized as a saint in the Eastern Orthodox Church and Roman Catholic Church.

== History ==
Burgundofaro was of an ancient noble Burgundian family. His father, Ageneric, was one of the principal lords at the Court of Theodebert II. His brothers were Waldebert, count of Guines, Ponthieu and Saint-Pol who became abbot of Luxeuil, and Chagnoald, who was bishop of Laon, while his sister was Burgundofara, who founded the convent of Faremoûtiers. They were the children of Chagnoric, chancellor to Dagobert I.

Faro spent his youth at the court of King Theodobert II. He served his successor, Theodoric, and then Clotaire II. At court he employed his credit with the king to protect the innocent, the orphan, and the widow; and to relieve and comfort all that were in distress. On one occasion, when provoked at the insolent speeches of certain Saxon ambassadors, Clothaire had them cast them into prison, and swore he would cause them to be put to death. Faro first prevailed on him to defer the execution twenty-four hours, and afterwards not only to pardon them, but also to send them home loaded with presents.

His sister, Burgundofara, had become an abbess, and in speaking with her, Faro formed the idea of giving up court life. Blidechilde, his wife, whose consent he asked, was in the same dispositions; and they parted by mutual consent. She took the religious veil, and retired to a solitary place upon one of her own estates. Faro received the tonsure and joined the clergy of Meaux.

Faro, who inherited lands in Guines from his brother, Count Waldebert, succeeded Gundoald, probably a kinsman of his, as bishop of Meaux at some time between 625 and 637. He built a monastery at Estrouanne, near the English channel port of Wissant, destroyed and burnt by Gormond and Isembart.

Fiacre approached Faro, as he had a desire to live a life of solitude in the forest. Faro assigned him a site at Breuil, in the region of Brie. Here Fiacre built an oratory in honour of the Virgin Mary, a hospice in which he received strangers, and a cell in which he himself lived apart.
