= Nicole de Dammartin =

German-Roman monarch

Nicole de Dammartin (fl. 1520), was a German-Roman monarch as Princess Abbess of the Imperial Remiremont Abbey in France. She was abbess from 1520 until 1520.

Nicole de Dammartin elected Madeleine de Choiseul as her successor, which was contested by Marguerite de Neufchâtel, Abbess of Baume. She soon resigned in favour of Marguerite d'Haraucourt; in 1528, de Neufchâtel prevailed and appointed Madeleine de Choiseul as coadjutrice.
