= Agnes II de Dammartin =

German-Roman monarch as Princess Abbess

Agnes II de Dammartin (fl. 1507), was a German-Roman monarch as Princess Abbess of the Imperial Remiremont Abbey in France. She was abbess from 1505 until 1507.

During her tenure, the discipline was described as lax. The nuns of the chapter had declared themselves canonesses without the consent of the pope, admitted only novices who could give proof of noble descent, and did not take the vows.
