= Marguerite III de Neufchâtel =

German-Roman monarch

Marguerite III de Neufchâtel (1480–1544) was a German-Roman monarch as Princess Abbess of the Imperial Remiremont Abbey in France. She ruled from 1528 to 1544 after overcoming Marguerite IV d'Harcourt in a power-struggle over the abbey.
