= Anstrudis =

9th-century Frankish Christian saint

Saint Anstrudis of Laon
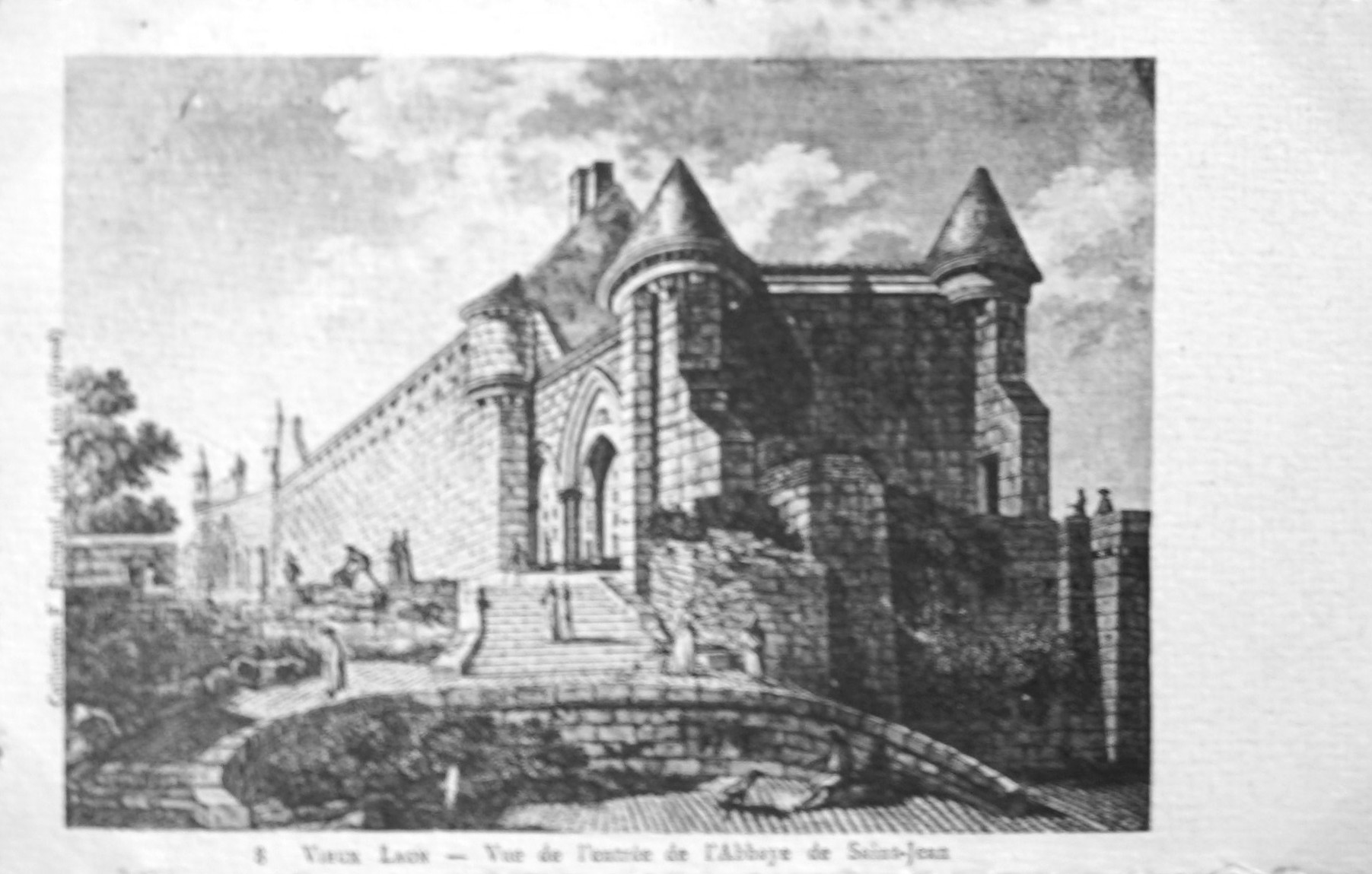
- Abbey of St John, Laon
- Born: c. 645; Laon
- Died: 688
- Venerated in: Catholic Church
- Feast: 17 October

Anstrudis (Anstrude, Austru, or Austrude) (c. 645 – 688) was a saint, virgin, and abbess of the Abbey of St. John, Laon. Her life story is recounted in a hagiography, entitled Vita Anstrudis abbatissae Laudunensis, written in the 9th century by an anonymous author. Antrudis was the daughter of Sadalberga, the first abbess of the Abbey of St. John in Laon, who succeeded Sadalberga after her death. She was reported to have performed many miracles, most of them after her death. Life was not much easier for Anstrudis; her hagiographer wrote, "the hardships foreshadowed by Sadalberga were visited upon her daughter Anstrude in her capacity as abbess". Anstrudis's abbacy coincided with the power struggle between the Pippinids and their adversaries, the Neustrians. Ebroin, an ally of Theuderic III of Neustria, sought to have Anstrudis ejected from her monastery and had her brother, Baldwin, murdered. She was able to overcome challenges to her authority as abbess by those who opposed her. Anstrudis died in 688, amidst many attributed miracles and healings. Her feast day is 17 October. She is honored as a saint in the Gallican and Benedictine calendars.

== Early life ==
Anstrudis, also known as Anstrude, Austru, or Austrude, was born c. 645. Her mother was Sadalberga, founder and abbess of the Abbey of St. John in Laon, and her father was Sadalberga's second husband, Blandius. Her life story is recounted in a hagiography, entitled Vita Anstrudis abbatissae Laudunensis, written in the 9th century by an anonymous author. Sadalberga's biographer, in her hagiography, Vita Sadalbergae (c. 680), reports that Sadalberga traveled to the basilica of Saint Remigius and prayed for children, committing them to the religious life. Anstrudis was the third of five children: Saretude, named after Sadalberga's mother; Ebana; a boy named Eustasius, who died in infancy; and her youngest brother, Baldwin, who also became a saint. According to historian Jo Ann McNamara, Anstrudis's life unfolded amid the violence of a power struggle between the Frankish kingdoms Neustria and Austrasia following the death of King Clothar III. Her vita reports, "She was carefully nurtured by her parents and brought to the Christian religion with much diligence". Fox, however, states that the Vita seems to imply that they did not raise her because they took up "a monastic calling", and because Anstrudis did not join the monastery until her teens. This would have left the responsibility of her early upbringing to her remaining relatives, who probably arranged a marriage to a young noble, even though she had different plans for her future.

Around 657, at the age of 12, Anstrudis entered her mother's abbey to avoid marriage to a man named Landramnus. In 670, Sadalberga died, and at the age of 20, Anstrudis succeeded her as abbess. To ensure the monastery's stability, the bishop of Laon and the local aristocracy had advised Sadalberga to secure the nuns' agreement to Anstrudis's promotion. Royal permission was also granted, and the bishop consecrated her as abbess. According to hagiographer Alban Butler, she reluctantly and "faithfully followed in [her mother's] steps". As historian Yaniv Fox said, life was not much easier for Anstrudis, adding that "the hardships foreshadowed by Sadalberga were visited upon her daughter Anstrude in her capacity as abbess".

== Career ==
According to Anstrudis's vita, she fasted and drank no water on Christmas, Easter, and Sundays until she had completed the offices of the psalter, and did not rest during vespers. During the day, she visited nearby churches and the ill. She participated in evening vigils too many to count. Her hagiographer stated, "She made every effort to subject herself to all the Lord's precepts so that in no moment of any hour might she be found without some divine work". Butler stated about Anstrudis: "By a scrupulous observance of monastic discipline in the least points, a tender and affectionate care in conducting her sisters in the path of Christian perfection, a most profuse charity to the poor, and her constant application to prayer, she was a true model of sanctity. No exterior employments interrupted the union of her heart with God, or her sweet attention to his holy presence". Butler also stated that she ate once a day at 3:00 in the afternoon, every day except Sundays, Christmas Day, or fast days after sunset. She prayed all night in the church, except for a short rest "in an uneasy seat before the church door".

Anstrudis was reported to have performed many miracles both before and after her death, which are described in her vita. During her lifetime, she is said to have healed many people of blindness, healed a woman of a severe headache after making the sign of the cross on her forehead, and raised a woman from "the sleep of death" who seemed to have stopped breathing. Fox stated, "[Anstrudis] had succeeded in healing chronic headaches, blindness and even reviving a comatose nun". Most of Anstrudis's reported miracles, as recounted in her vita, occurred after her death. After she died, she was reputed to have healed people, after they came or were brought to her tomb, of paralysis, blindness, muteness, demon possession, a "flow of blood", hydropsy, and a wound that would not heal. A nun in the monastery had a vision in a dream of Anstrudis, who told her to instruct the abbess to build an altar in the monastery's basilica so that "the faithful who prayed in the name of Jesus might obtain what they asked". According to her hagiography, she also helped a prisoner escape imprisonment and execution. Anstrudis's vita states, "Daily benefits were given at her sepulcher by her prayers to all the petitioning faithful".

Anstrudis's abbacy coincided with the power struggle between the Pippinids and their adversaries, the Neustrians. Fox reports that Anstrudis and her brothers might have supported the Pippinids. Ebroin, an ally of Theuderic III of Neustria, sought to have Anstrudis ejected from her monastery and had her brother, Baldwin, murdered. In about 679, Baldwin was ambushed by two men not named in her vita, who used Baldwin's murder to conspire against his sister. Anstrudis sent Baldwin to negotiate a settlement with her opposition, but he was betrayed and "slain by those whom he had believed to be his and Anstrude's friends". The Vita states that Anstrudis blamed herself and compared her grief to that of Job in the Bible. It dedicates two pages to describing her grief, adding that the residents of Laon and the nuns in her monastery grieved with her. Fox states, however, that although the incident was recounted in the first half of the Vita, "it can hardly be considered forthcoming in detail".

Anstrudis's vita reports that Ebroin, while in Laon with Theuderic III, "exploded into the monastery and, burning with wrath, ordered the abbess deposed and driven into exile". The "miraculous, gentle singing" of the nuns' choir soothed him and prevented Anstrudis's martyrdom, and the scene concludes with Ebroin's tearful remorse, "and with no better explanation than his fear of the abbess' supernatural prowess". The Vita reports that he also promised to support her and the monastery, but a few days after she returned to the palace, a man named Cariveus began to plot against her. He chased her into a church and threatened to kill her with a sword, but she stood up against him and "prayed confidently to God". He responded to her faith and bravery with fear of divine judgment; he begged for her forgiveness, which she granted. Cariveus died a few days later anyway and was buried in the same place he had attacked Anstrudis. Two years later, a young man named Ebroard attacked Laon. He came to the monastery and threatened Anstrudis, demanding its keys. The day after he took them, he died in front of the monastery gates, but she buried him, anyway. Madelgar, the bishop of Laon, also tried to usurp Anstrudis's authority over the monastery. She resisted and sent word to Pippin about the conflict, so he sent his son Grimoald to "go respectfully to Laon with instructions to see that Bishop Madelgar caused God's beloved virgin no anxiety".

== Death ==
Anstrudis died in 688. According to her vita, as she approached death, she called the sisters of the monastery to her, asked for their forgiveness, and forgave each of them. Two days before she died, "an immense brilliance shone around the house" where she lay. A "brightness like a shining star lay on her breast and entered into her mouth" the hour she died, and the witnesses saw it fly to heaven. As her body was brought to burial, while the people there wept, two birds, "gleaming with ineffable splendor", landed on the roof of the monastery until her body was carried away. As the body was carried into the monastery's basilica, a woman with a wound under her armpit reverently placed Anstrudis's hand on her wound and was healed. The day after Anstrudis's body was buried, a woman possessed by a demon was healed after approaching the tomb.

Anstrudis's family did not continue into future generations; as Fox put it, "snuffed out by [Anstrudis'] commitment to her virginity and her brother [Baldwin's] untimely death". Her feast day is 17 October. She is honored as a saint in the Gallican and Benedictine calendars.

== Works cited ==
- Fox, Yaniv (2014). Power and Religion in Merovingian Gaul: Columbanian Monasticism and the Formation of the Frankish Aristocracy. Cambridge, U.K.: Cambridge University Press. ISBN 978-1-107-06459-1.
- Le Jan, Régine (2001). "Convents, Violence, and Competition for Power in Seventh-Century Francia". In de Jong, Mayke; Theuws, Frans (eds.). Topographies of Power in the Early Middle Ages. Leiden, Netherlands: Brill. pp. 243–269. ISBN 90-04-11734-2.
- McNamara, Jo Ann; Halborg, John E.; Whatley, E. Gordon (1996a). "Anstrude, Abbess of Leon". In McNamara, Jo Ann; Halborg, John E.; Whatley, E. Gordon (eds.). Sainted Women of the Dark Ages. Duke University Press. pp. 289–303. ISBN 0-8223-1200-X.
- McNamara, Jo Ann; Halborg, John E.; Whatley, E. Gordon (1996b). "Sadalberga, Abbess of Leon". In McNamara, Jo Ann; Halborg, John E.; Whatley, E. Gordon (eds.). Sainted Women of the Dark Ages. Duke University Press. pp. 176–194. ISBN 0-8223-1200-X.
