= Burgundofara =

Frankish Abbess

Saint Burgundofara
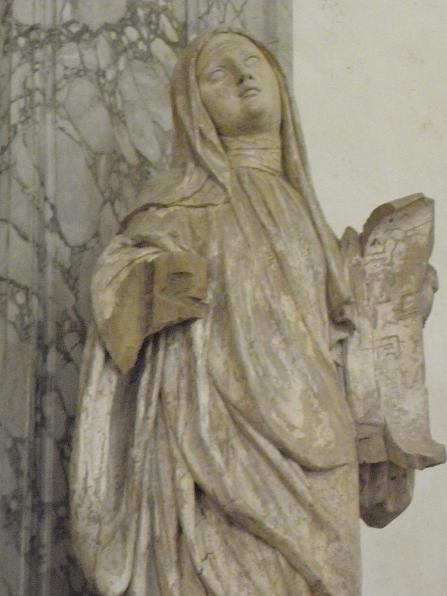
- Died: 643 or 655
- Venerated in: Roman Catholic Church; Eastern Orthodox Church
- Feast: 3 April; at Faremoutiers, she was commemorated on 7 December. She continues to be commemorated on 7 December in the Orthodox Church.

Burgundofara (born c. 595, died between 643 and 675,) also called Fara and Sainte Fare (modern Fr.), was a virgin, abbess, and saint. Born to a noble family near Meaux, near Paris, she was consecrated by the Irish missionary, Saint Columbanus, to enter a monastery at a young age. Her father, Agneric, who was a principal official at the court of Theodebert II, opposed his daughter's desire to become a nun and arranged a marriage for her, despite her consecration. He threatened her life when she refused, but Saint Eustathius, Columbanus' successor, intervened. She used her father's funds to found a monastery in Faremoutiers, a double monastery that became one of the most distinguished in France. Medieval scholars have discussed Burgundofara's demonstration of how noble women who entered monasteries handled wealth and property during the Middle Ages. She lived at and was abbess of the Faremoutiers monastery for 40 years. Burgundofara is the patron saint of Cinisi, Sicily, and of eye ailments. She is devoted in France, Sicily, Italy, and other countries. She performed miracles both before and after her death. Her feast day is December 7.

== Life ==
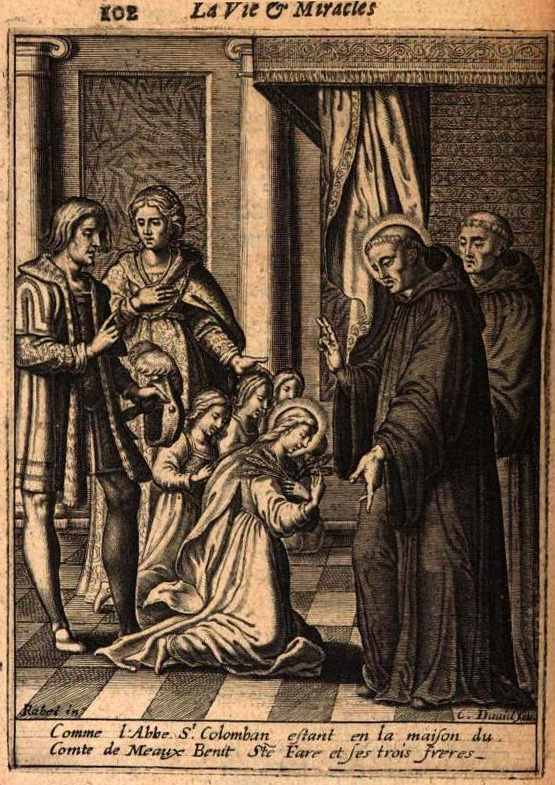
Colombanus blesses Burgundofara

Burgundofara was born c. 595 near Meaux, near Paris. Her father was Agneric, a principal official at the court of Theodebert II, and her mother was Leodegonda. She had four siblings: St. Chagnold, who was a monk under the Irish missionary, Saint Columbanus, at the Luxeuil Abbey, St. Burgundofaro, who was the royal chancellor before becoming the bishop of Meaux, Waldebert, who was a count of Guines, Ponthieu, and Saint-Pol and later abbot of Luxeuil in Burgundy, and Agnetrada (or Agnetrudis). According to medieval scholar Jo Ann McNamara, Burgundofara's life was recounted by the hagiographer, Jonas of Bobbio, who probably knew her.

In 610, when Burgundofara was a child, her family was visited at their home in Meaux by Columbanus, who had been exiled from Luxeuil; he blessed the entire family and consecrated Burgundofara. (Note: According to hagiographer Alban Bulter, different sources give different ages at the time of Burgundofara's consecration, at infancy, at 10 years old, and at 15 years old.) According to Jonas, in his vita of Columbanus, her father opposed it, preferring that she marry instead. After he arranged a marriage for her, she became ill with a fever and an eye problem until Columbanus visited his friend, revealing to him that if he relented and released her from the marriage, she would recover. Columbanus healed her, and she recovered, but Agneric did not keep his promise. Burgundofara fled, taking refuge in a church in Soissons. She was discovered, and her father sent her brothers, Burgundofaro and Chagnold, after her, threatening Burgundofara with death if she did not return home. St. Eustathius, Columbanus' successor, intervened, convinced Agneric to reconsider, and she received vows as a nun. According to the hagiographer, Aldus Butler, she answered to the threat by saying, "Do you think I am afraid of death? To lose my life for the sake of virtue, and fidelity to the promise I have made to God, would be a great happiness". All this happened in 614, a year or two before the founding of the Faremoutier monastery.

Historian Jo Ann McNamara, in her discussion of noble women during the Middle Ages, states that Jonas' account of Burgundofara's life was an example of how "the frequency with which noble women of the age entered monasteries with all their wealth suggests a family strategy that may have opposed the king's desire to dispose of heiresses among his own followers". McNamara goes on to state that if the king insisted that she marry, Jonas' story gave her father "an iron-clad excuse" to disobey his demands. Instead, Agneric gave Burgundofara a grant of land, on which, with the support of Eustasius, she founded a monastery in Faremoutiers. Faremoultiers was one of the first monasteries founded under Columbunus' direct influence and was one of the most distinguished monasteries in France. Historian Edward James agrees with McNamara, stating that after an illness from which she almost died, Burgundofara created a last will and testament to prevent her family from taking her lands after her death, adding that it "gives us a fascinating glimpse, and the only one that survives, into the sources of a Frankish woman's wealth in the seventh century". James goes on to describe the wealth of Burgundofara and her siblings; all but one of the properties she owned were devoted to her monastery, which was customary during this period for women who inherited wealth and property after their parents' deaths.

Jonas' vita recounts several events that occurred at Faremoutier. Eustasius appointed Burgundofara's brothers, Chagnold and Waldebert, to instruct her in the monastic rules she used at the monastery. According to McNamara, Jonas gave no details about Faremoutiers' "foundation or its way of life", although McNamara postulates that Burgundofara probably introduced her brother Waldebert's mixed monastic rule or a tailored one like Donatus of Besançon's. Faremoutier was a double monastery; both nuns and monks were present, although the monks did not hold prominent positions and seemed to serve in menial roles. Many of them were former serfs monasticized to perform manual labor for the nuns. Priests were unimportant there. A church, dedicated to the Virgin Mary and Saints Peter and Paul, was built nearby. The monastery became "a center of fervent spiritual life". McNamara states that "Burgandofara herself heard the confessions of her nuns three times a day but apparently commanded no sacramental power of absolution". The Eucharist seemed to be a relatively rare and special event, and Burgundofara apparently administered the Eucharist herself, perhaps from a reserved supply, when a nun was on her deathbed. Wine and milk were forbidden at the monastery, at least during Lent and Advent. According to hagiographer Sabine Baring-Gould, her example attracted many followers among the wives of daughters of Frankish nobility, including Earcongotha, an Anglo-Saxon princess and daughter of Eorcenberht of Kent, and two members of the East Anglian royal family, Aæthryth and Æthelburh of Barking, who both later became the monastery's abbesses. She lived at and served as abbess at Faremoutiers for forty years.

== Death and legacy ==
Burgundofara died, after a "painful lingering illness," between 643 and 675. She was buried near the altar of the church nearby, with her brother Burgundofaro present. She left all her property to the monastery, except for a share in a villa in Louvres, which she gave to her siblings in exchange for their agreement not to interfere with her bequest. Her feast day is December 7. She is the patron saint of eye afflictions. A few decades after her death, Majolus, the abbot of the monastery in Meaux, "removed her relics from the ground and exposed them for public veneration". Some of her relics are in the parish church at Faremoutiers and in Champeaux. In 2024, the Societa Santa Fara di Cinisi (Santa Fara Club), a social and religious organization in Sterling Heights, Michigan, a suburb of Detroit, which was "dedicated to preserving and celebrating Italian heritage and culture", celebrated its 100th anniversary with a Mass, procession, and veneration of Burgundofara's relics. The relics were brought from Cinisi, Sicily, of which Burgundofara is the patron saint. A statue of her has stood in the Holy Family parish church in Sterling Heights, built in 1909 by Italian immigrants, for over 100 years.

According to Butler, "a great number of miracles have been wrought through her intercession". For example, Charlotte de Bret (b. 1595), the daughter of a financial officer in Paris, who became a nun at Faremoutier in 1609, lost her left eye when she was seven years old; in 1617, she lost her right eye and became blind. Specialists in Paris were consulted, but they said that her sight could never be restored, and the remedies to remove her pain extinguished all feeling in her eyeballs and adjacent nerves. In 1622, when Burgundofara's relics were removed from her shrine, de Bret kissed one of the bones and then applied it to both eyes. She immediately felt pain, even though she had no feeling in her eyes for over four years, and the lids were "immovably closed". Right after removing the relics from her eyes, a humor distilled from them; she begged that the relics be applied a second and then a third time. After the third time, her sight was restored, and she gained perfect sight. Her restored sight was confirmed by her surgeons and physicians, and affidavits were taken by the bishop of Meaux, John de la Chastre, who declared, based on the evidence, that her blindness had been cured. The abbess, Frances de la Chastre, and the nuns at the monastery issued a certificate supporting the decision, which also mentioned the cures of two other nuns ascribed to Burgundofara, including palsy and rheumatism. Butler also reported that Burgundofara is devoted in France, Sicily, Italy, and other countries.

== Works cited ==
- Baring-Gould, Sabine (1877). The Lives of the Saints. Vol. 15. London: John Hodges.
- James, Edward (2020). "Elite Women in the Merovingian Period". In Effros, Bonnie; Moreira, Isabel (eds.). The Oxford Handbook of the Merovingian World. Oxford University Press. pp. 238–254. ISBN 9780197510803.
- Lambert of Ardres (2001). The History of the Counts of Guines and Lords of Ardres. Translated by Shopkow, Leah. Philadelphia, Pennsylvania: University of Pennsylvania Press. ISBN 978-0-8122-1996-8.
- McNamara, Jo Ann (1996). "Burgundofara, Abbess of Faremoutiers". In McNamara, Jo Ann; Halborg, John E.; Whatley, E. Gordon (eds.). Sainted Women of the Dark Ages. Duke University Press. pp. 155–175. ISBN 0-8223-1200-X.
