= Allann Petitjean =

French footballer (born 1974)

Allann Petitjean (born 31 July 1974 in Luxeuil-les-Bains, Haute-Saône) is a French football midfielder currently playing for French Championnat National side Nîmes Olympique.

His previous clubs include FC Sochaux, SAS Epinal, Amiens SC, CS Sedan and Stade Reims.
