= Abbey of St John, Laon =

Abbey in Aisne, France

Coordinates: 49.5622°N 3.6225°E

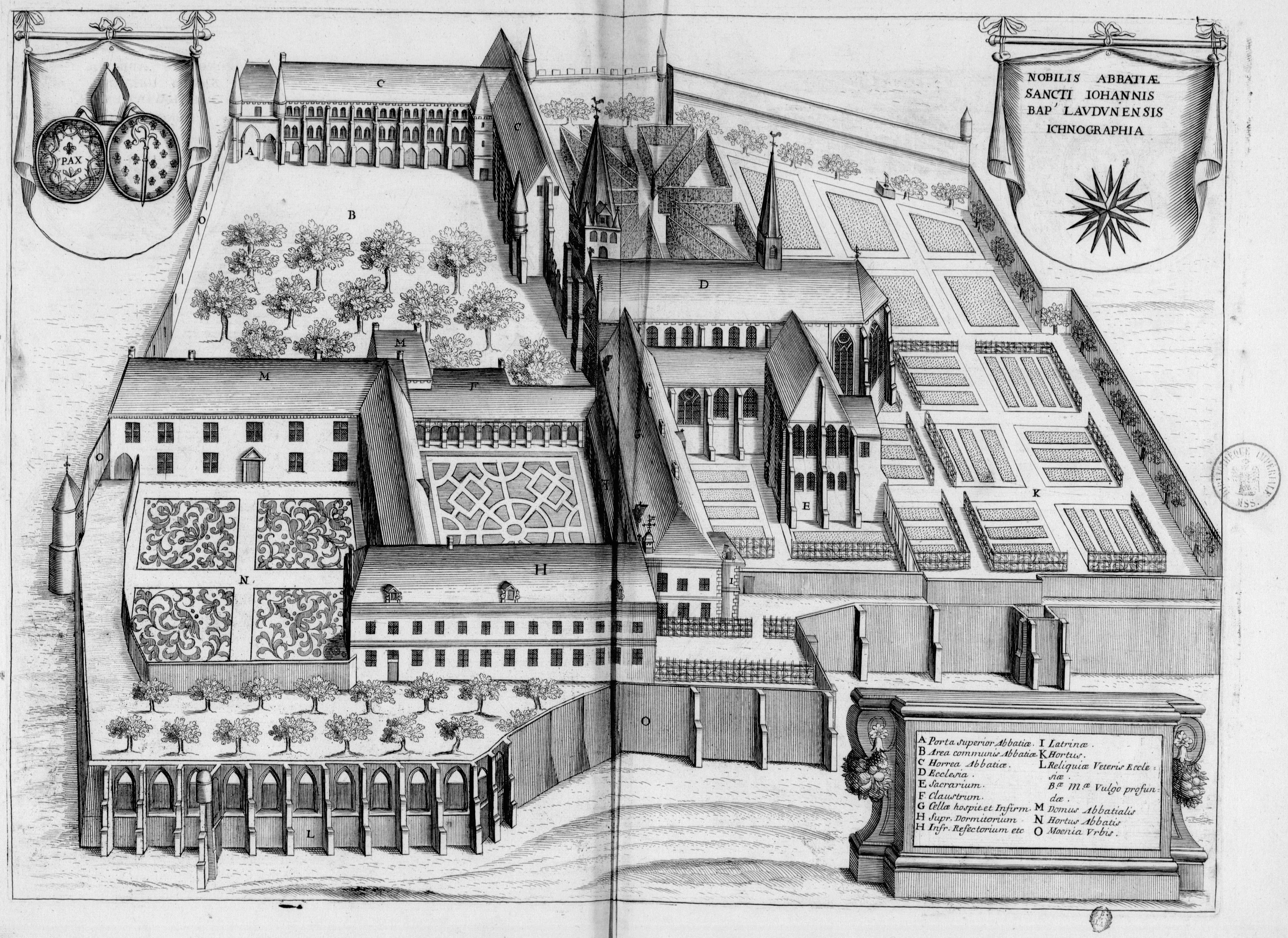
Engraving of the abbey in the Monasticon Gallicanum (late 17th century)

The Abbey of St. John, Laon (French: Abbaye Saint-Jean de Laon) was a Benedictine monastery in Laon, France, from 1128 to 1766, which replaced a nunnery founded in 641. The prefecture of the department of Aisne now occupies the site.

== History ==
In 641 Saint Sadalberga, sister of Saint Leudinus Bodo, disciple of Saint Eustace, second abbot of Luxeuil, and widow of Saint Blandinus, retired to Laon, where she founded a nunnery outside the city walls, south of the town. The dedication was to Our Lady ("Notre-Dame"), the same as that of Laon Cathedral. The community grew rapidly to some 300 nuns. Sadalberga then made it a double monastery. She was herself the first abbess. The second abbess was her daughter, Saint Anstrudis.

The abbey had initially followed an adaptation of the demanding Rule of St. Columbanus but later adopted the Rule of St. Benedict. In 1128 the nuns were replaced by a community of Benedictine monks. At around the same time the dedication changed from Our Lady to Saint John the Baptist.

The abbey was partly destroyed in the wars against the Huguenots, but rebuilt in the 17th century. In 1648 it was taken over by the Maurists. The buildings were renovated from 1742. In 1766 the monastery was suppressed. The college of Laon moved into the premises in 1781.

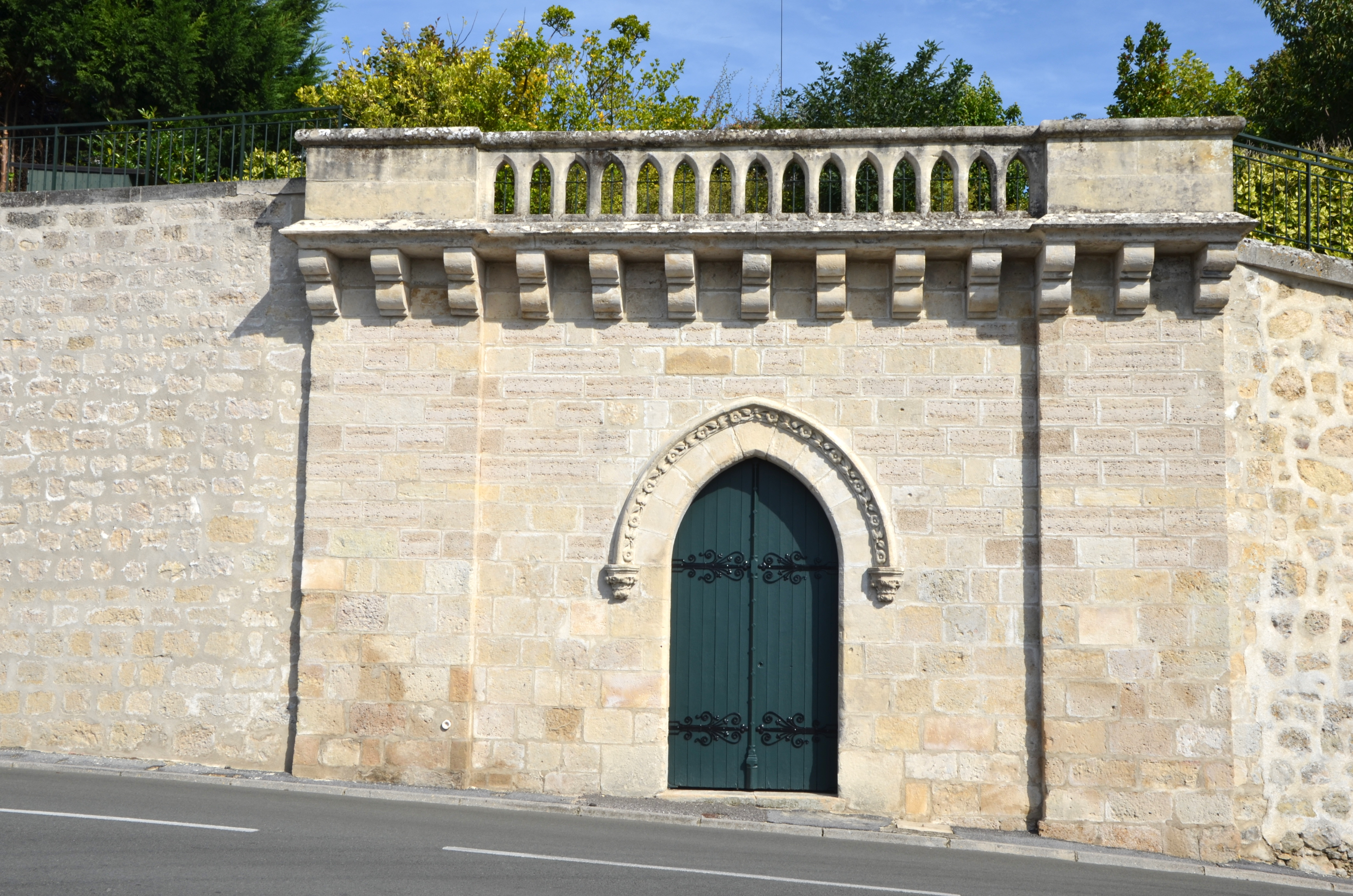
Former entrance

In 1800 the prefect of the department of Aisne took the complex over and today the entire prefecture stands on the site. The physical remains of the former abbey include some buttresses built into the city wall, parts of a church portal and the 18th-century cloister. It is commemorated in the street name "Rue du Cloître Saint-Jean".
