= Marguerite IV d'Harcourt =

French abbess

Marguerite IV d'Haraucourt, (15??–1568), was a German-Roman monarch as Princess Abbess of the Imperial Remiremont Abbey in France. She was abbess twice: a first term 1520–28, and a second in 1544–68.

She was elected in 1520, but was deposed in 1528. In 1544, she became abbess for a second term. During her reign, Remiremont was forced to submit to the sovereignty of the Duchy of Lorraine.
