= Amatus =

Saint Amatus
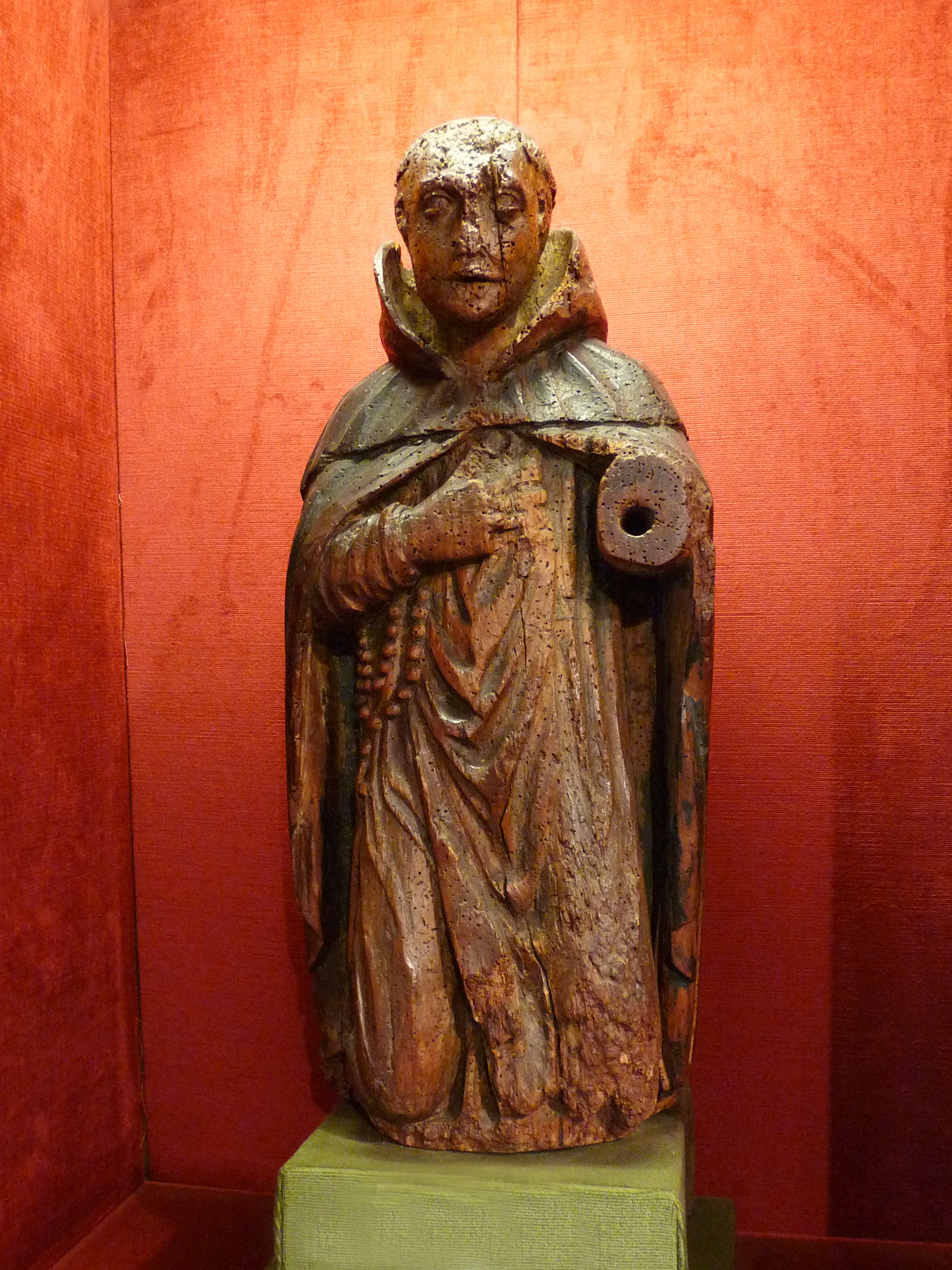
- Remiremont-Saint Amé
- Born: c. 560; Gratianopolis, Grenoble, Kingdom of Burgundy, Francia
- Died: c. 625 or 627–630 (aged 64–65/66–70); Remiremont Abbey, Vosges, Francia
- Venerated in: Eastern Orthodox Church; Roman Catholicism
- Canonized: 3 December 1049 by Pope Leo IX
- Feast: 13 September
- Influenced: Romaric of Remiremont

Saint Amatus (c. 560 – c. 625 or 627/630 AD), also called Amatus of Grenoble, Amatus of Remiremont or Saint Amé, was a Frankish Colombanian monk and hermit. Together with St. Romaric, he founded Remiremont Abbey.

== Biography ==
The Vita sancti Amati confessoris was written sometime between 670 and 700, probably by a monk of Remiremont.

Amatus was born about the year 560 to a noble family at Grenoble. Around 581, he entered the Abbey of St. Maurice, Agaunum, and at the age of thirty retired into a hermitage, where his reputation for a life of penance and prayer, privileged with the grace of miracle working, drew the attention of Eustace of Luxeuil, who persuaded Amatus to join his community.

One of his missionary journeys brought him to the court at Metz, and there he converted a former Count Palatine of King Theodebert II, the Frankish noble St. Romaric. St. Romaric founded with Amatus a double monastery for men and women at Remiremont Abbey on land that had been in Romaric's possession since his days as a count palatine. As at Luxeuil, they followed the Rule of St. Columbanus.

Amatus was its first abbot. He ruled this Abbey for many years, and established there the difficult pious practice of the “Laus perennis” or Perpetual Praise, which consisted in the maintaining in the Church an uninterrupted service of Psalmody and Prayer, day and night. Saint Amatus died in the year 627, and at his own request was buried just outside the church door. Later, his remains were suitably enshrined under one of the altars of the same church.

== Veneration ==
Saint Amatus was canonized on 3 December 1049 by Pope Leo IX and his memorial day is 13 September. He is particularly honored in Grenoble.

== See also ==
- Saint Aimé, the abbot of the Agaune monastery in Switzerland and bishop of the Sens (or Sion) diocese.
- Saint-Amé, a commune in the Vosges department in Lorraine in northeastern France.
