= Louvre (disambiguation) =

The Louvre is an art museum in Paris, France, located in the Louvre Palace.

Louvre or Louvres may also refer to:

- Louvre, an alternative name for the 1st arrondissement of Paris
- Louvre (window), a window blind or window shutter
  - Louvre window, a window composed of louvres
- Louvres, Val-d'Oise, a commune in Île-de-France, France
- 4513 Louvre, an asteroid
- "The Louvre" (song), a 2017 song by Lorde from Melodrama
- L'Œuvre (novel) an 1885 novel by Émile Zola
- Le Louvre: The Palace & Its Paintings, a 1995 art-based video game
- The Messenger (2001 video game) or Louvre: L'Ultime Malédiction

== People with the surname ==
- Jean de Louvres, French architect

== See also ==
- Carrousel du Louvre, a shopping centre under the palace grounds
- École du Louvre, an institution of higher education in the palace
- Groupe du Louvre, a French hotel group
- Hôtel Louvre et Paix, Marseilles, France
- Louvre Abu Dhabi, a branch of the museum in Abu Dhabi, United Arab Emirates
- Louvre Accord, signed by the G6 in 1987 in the palace
- Medieval Louvre, the predecessor to the present-day building
- Louvre-Lens, a branch of the museum in the Lens, Pas-de-Calais, France
- Louvre–Rivoli station, a Paris Metro station
- Palais Royal–Musée du Louvre station, a Paris Metro station
- Place du Louvre, a square next to the palace
- Port du Louvre, a riverside walkway next to the palace
- Quai du Louvre, a river quai on the Seine next to the palace
