= Eustace of Luxeuil =

Saint Eustace of Luxeuil
- Died: 626
- Venerated in: Roman Catholic Church; Eastern Orthodox Church
- Feast: March 29

Eustace of Luxeuil (c. 560 – c. 626), also known as Eustasius, was the second abbot of Luxeuil from 611. He succeeded his teacher Columbanus, to whom he had been a favorite disciple and monk. He had been the head of the monastic school.

== Life ==
Eustace was born in Burgundy and became a monk at Luxeuil. When Columbanus, the founder of Luxeuil, was banished from the Kingdom of Burgundy, on account of his reproving the morals of King Theuderic II, he recommended his community choose Eustace as his successor. Subsequently, Columbanus settled at Bobbio in Italy. After the death of Theuderic, Clothaire II sent Eustace to Bobbio to ask Columbanus to return, but the exiled abbot declined.

Under the administration of Eustace, the monastery acquired renown as a seat of learning and sanctity. Through the royal patronage, its benefices and lands were increased, King Clotaire II devoting a yearly sum, from his own revenues, towards its support. Eustace and his monks devoted themselves to preaching in remote districts, not yet evangelized, chiefly in the north-eastern extremities of Gaul. Their missionary work extended even to Bavaria. Between the monasteries of Luxeuil in France and that of Bobbio in Italy (both founded by Columbanus), connection and intercourse seem to have long been kept up.

During his abbacy, the monastery contained about 600 monks and produced both bishops and saints, including Acarius, Amatus, Audomar, and Romaric. Eustace was noted for his humility, continual prayer, and fasting. Eustasius undertook missionary journeys to the Variscans on the river Doubs and as far as Bavaria. Around 625 he founded a monastery on the island of Herrenchiemsee. He was succeeded as abbott by Waldebert.

A tradition states that he cured Sadalberga of blindness. Upon returning from Bavaria, her father, Gundoin, Duke of Alsace provided hospitality to the abbot on his travels. Duke Gundoin and his wife brought two of their sons for the abbot's blessing but were hesitant to present the blind child. Through the prayers of Eustace the child was cured of her blindness. He is said to have also procured a cure for Burgundofara.

His feast day is March 29.
