= Luxeuil-les-Bains =

- Commune
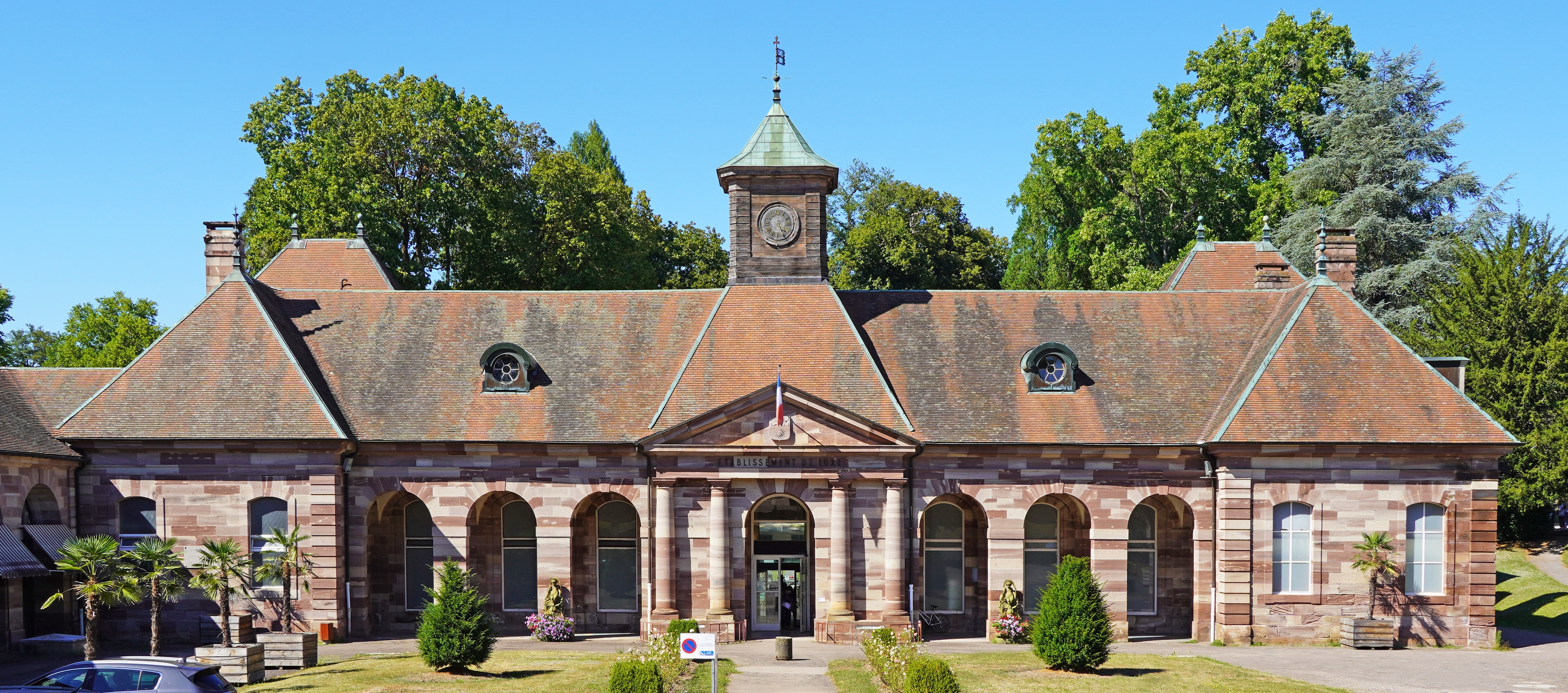
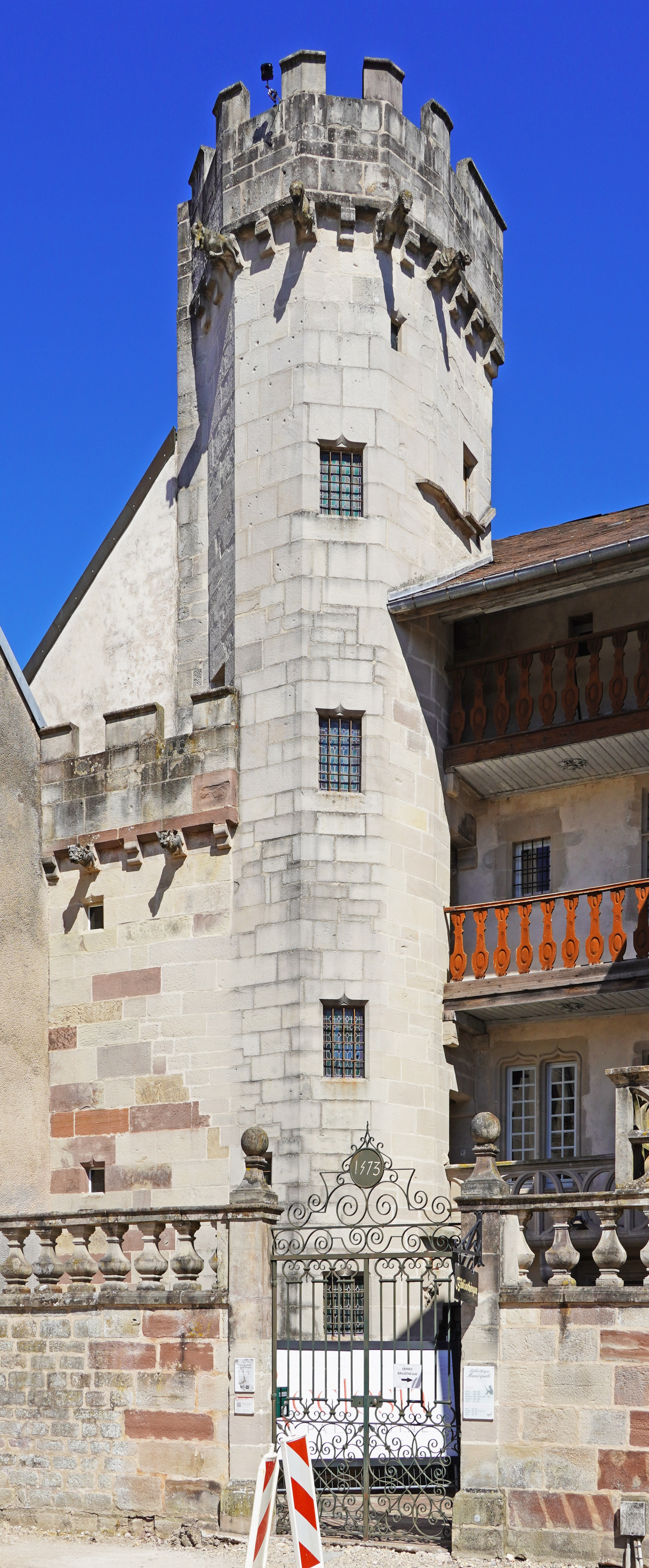
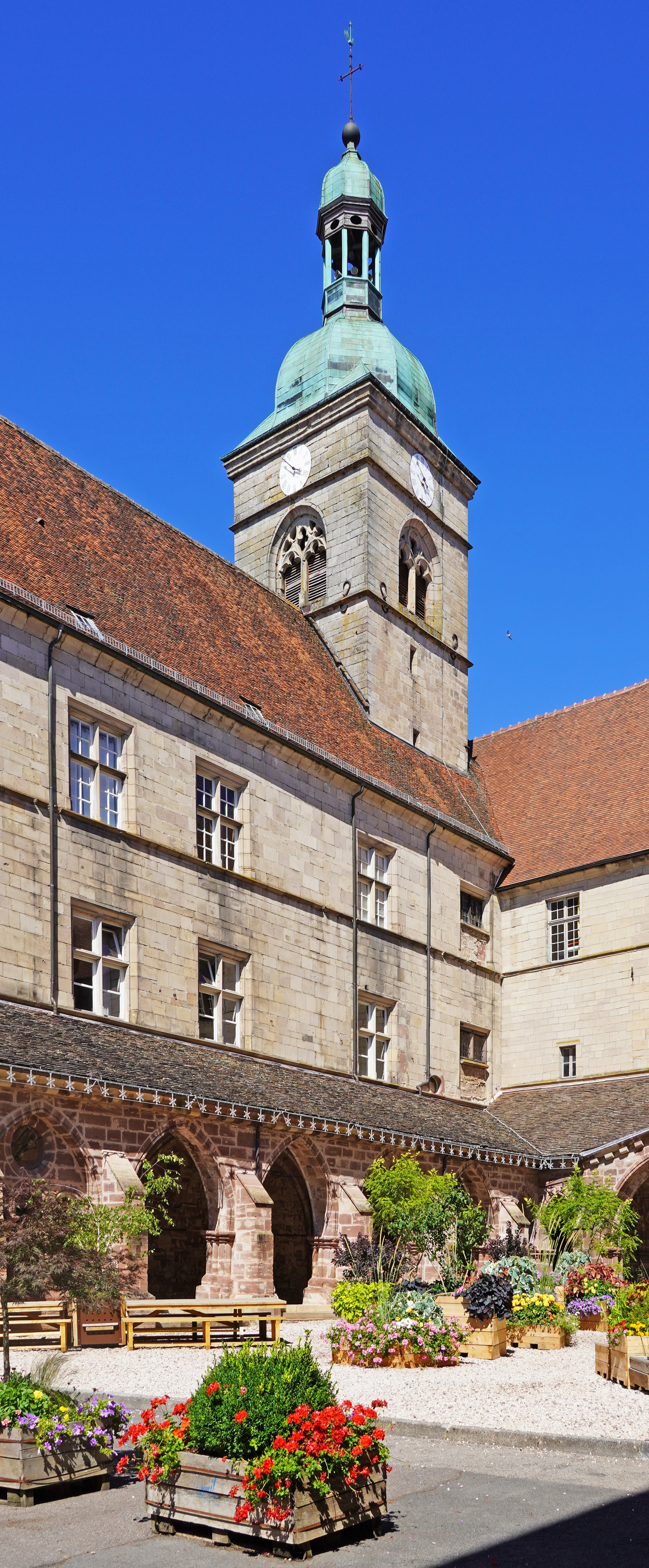
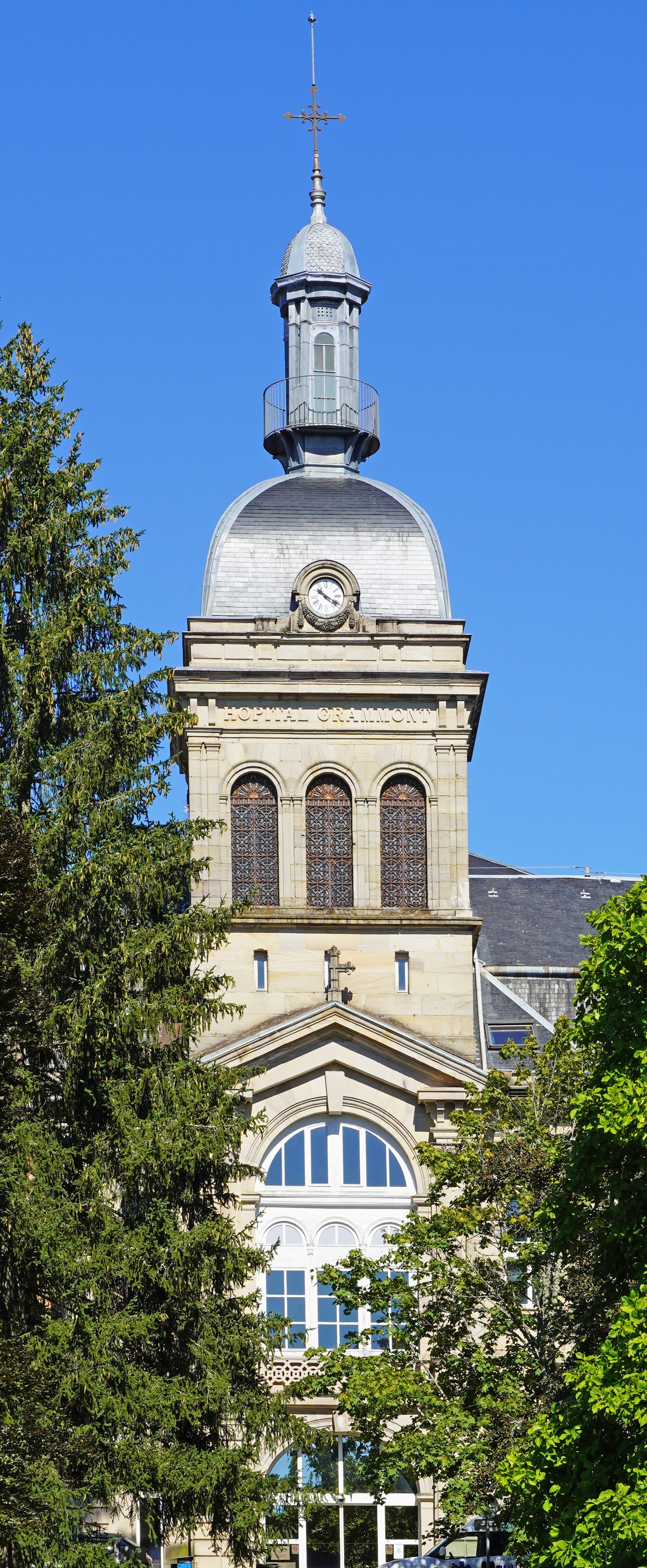
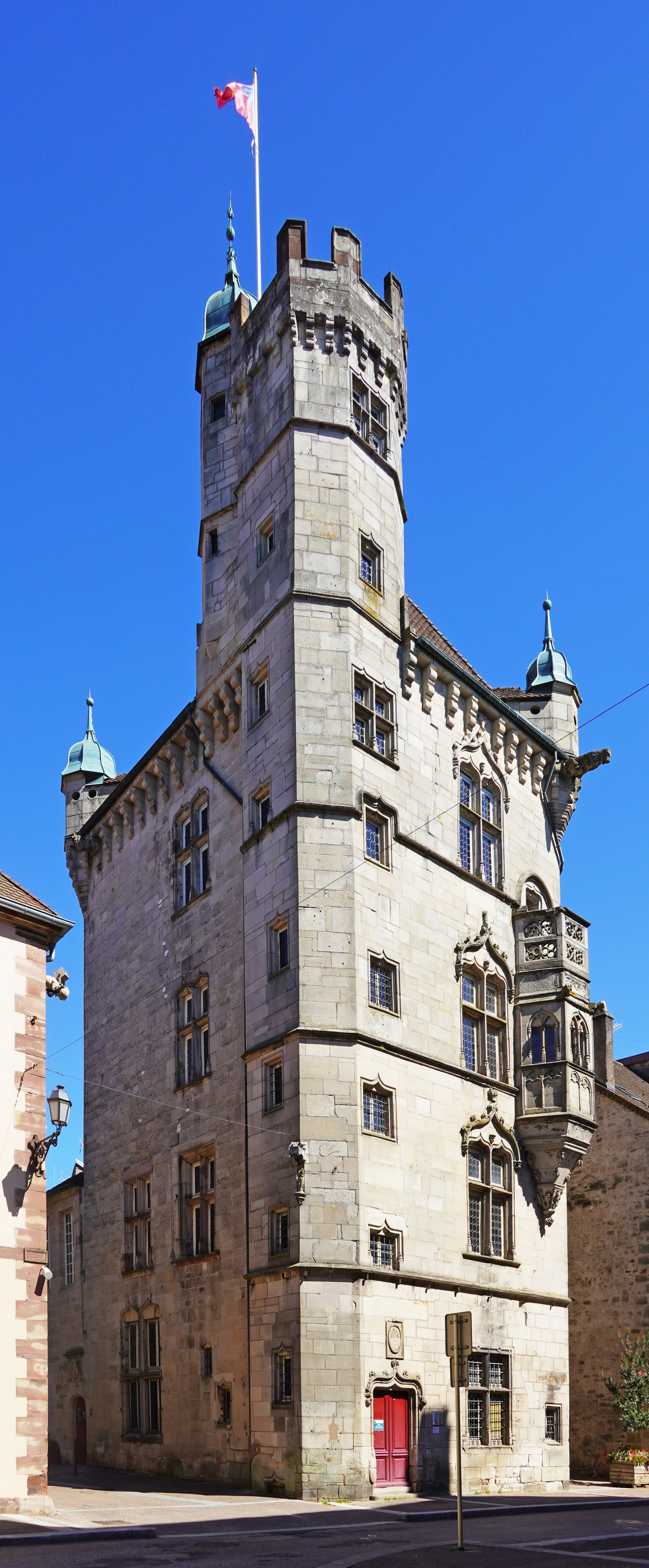
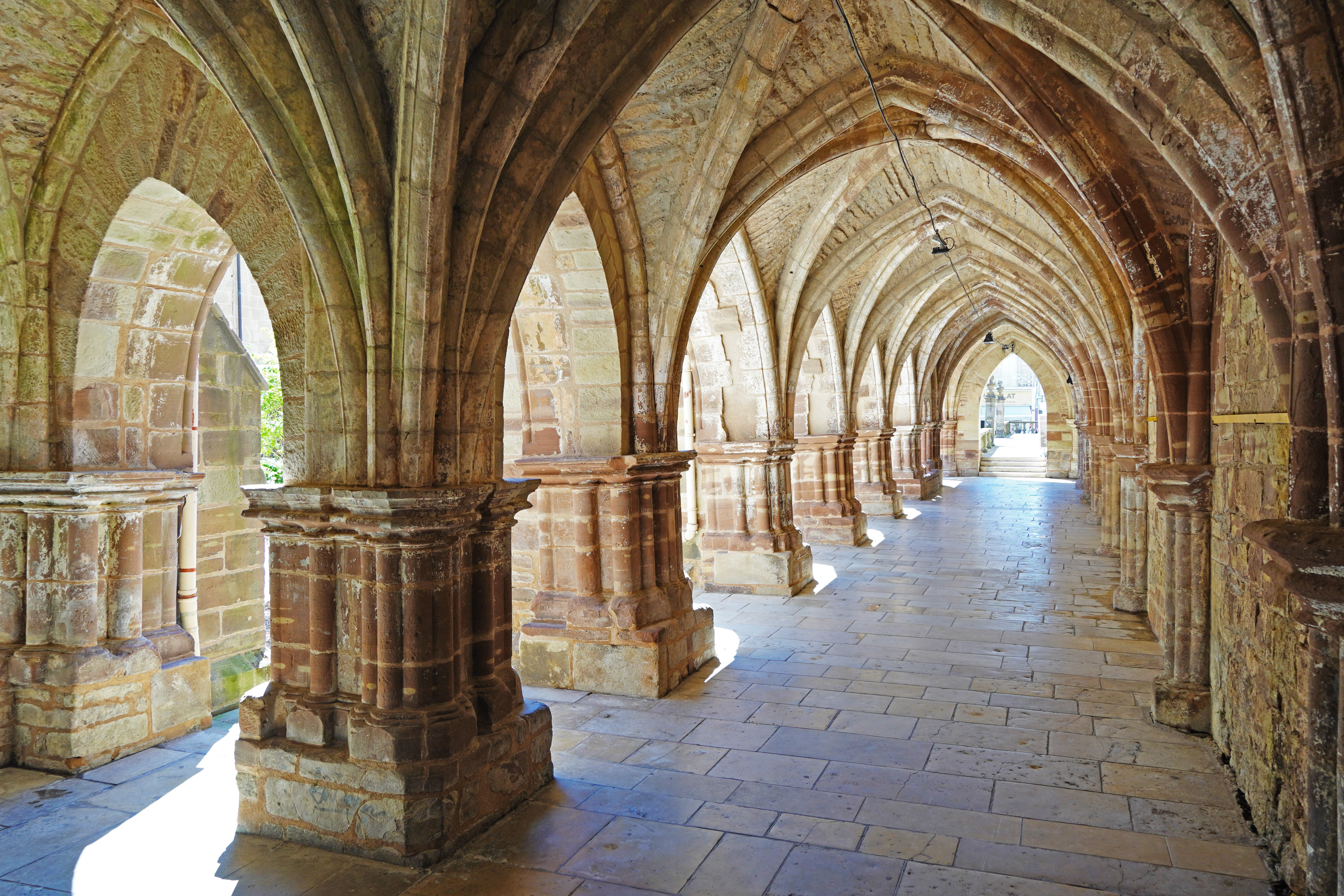

- Coat of arms
- Location of Luxeuil-les-Bains
- Location within France Location within Bourgogne-Franche-Comté
- Coordinates: 47°49′01″N 6°22′53″E
- Country: France
- Region: Bourgogne-Franche-Comté
- Department: Haute-Saône
- Arrondissement: Lure
- Canton: Luxeuil-les-Bains
- Intercommunality: Pays de Luxeuil

Government
  - Mayor (2020–2026): Frédéric Burghard
- Area^{1}: 21.81 km^{2} (8.42 sq mi)
- Elevation: 294 m (965 ft)
- Highest elevation: 395 m (1,296 ft)
- Lowest elevation: 260 m (850 ft)
- Population (2023): 6,663
  - Density: 305.5/km^{2} (791.2/sq mi)
- Time zone: UTC+01:00 (CET)
  - Summer (DST): UTC+02:00 (CEST)
- INSEE/Postal code: 70311 /70300
- ^{1} French Land Register data, which excludes lakes, ponds, glaciers > 1 km^{2} (0.386 sq mi or 247 acres) and river estuaries.

Luxeuil-les-Bains (French pronunciation: [lyksœj le bɛ̃]) is a commune in the Haute-Saône department in the region of Bourgogne-Franche-Comté west of Mulhouse in eastern France.

== History ==
Luxeuil (sometimes rendered Luxeu in older texts) was the Roman Luxovium and contained many fine buildings at the time of its destruction by the Huns under Attila in 451. In 590, St Columban here founded the Abbey of Luxeuil, afterwards one of the most famous in Franche-Comté.

In the 8th century, it was destroyed by the Saracens; afterwards rebuilt, monastery and town were devastated by the Normans, Magyars, and Muslims in the 9th century and pillaged on several occasions afterwards. The burning of the monastery and ravaging of the town were commonly used to illustrate the point that no place in Europe was safe during the invasions.

The abbey schools were celebrated in the Middle Ages and the abbots had great influence; but their power was curtailed by the emperor Charles V and the abbey was suppressed at the time of the French Revolution.

== Climate ==
Climate data for Luxeuil-les-Bains, elevation: 271 m (889 ft) (1991–2020 normals, extremes 1944–present)
Month	Jan	Feb	Mar	Apr	May	Jun	Jul	Aug	Sep	Oct	Nov	Dec	Year
Record high °C (°F)	18.0 (64.4)	22.5 (72.5)	25.2 (77.4)	29.0 (84.2)	33.0 (91.4)	37.3 (99.1)	38.9 (102.0)	38.5 (101.3)	34.0 (93.2)	29.2 (84.6)	23.5 (74.3)	19.1 (66.4)	38.9 (102.0)
Mean daily maximum °C (°F)	5.6 (42.1)	7.6 (45.7)	12.3 (54.1)	16.4 (61.5)	20.2 (68.4)	23.9 (75.0)	26.0 (78.8)	25.8 (78.4)	21.3 (70.3)	16.2 (61.2)	9.9 (49.8)	6.2 (43.2)	15.9 (60.6)
Daily mean °C (°F)	2.2 (36.0)	3.2 (37.8)	6.8 (44.2)	10.1 (50.2)	14.2 (57.6)	17.8 (64.0)	19.7 (67.5)	19.5 (67.1)	15.4 (59.7)	11.3 (52.3)	6.2 (43.2)	3.0 (37.4)	10.8 (51.4)
Mean daily minimum °C (°F)	−1.2 (29.8)	−1.1 (30.0)	1.3 (34.3)	3.9 (39.0)	8.1 (46.6)	11.7 (53.1)	13.5 (56.3)	13.2 (55.8)	9.5 (49.1)	6.4 (43.5)	2.4 (36.3)	−0.2 (31.6)	5.6 (42.1)
Record low °C (°F)	−25.9 (−14.6)	−25.4 (−13.7)	−20.2 (−4.4)	−7.2 (19.0)	−5.6 (21.9)	−0.1 (31.8)	0.8 (33.4)	0.2 (32.4)	−3.0 (26.6)	−8.2 (17.2)	−13.6 (7.5)	−22.6 (−8.7)	−25.9 (−14.6)
Average precipitation mm (inches)	79.7 (3.14)	68.4 (2.69)	69.5 (2.74)	66.2 (2.61)	93.1 (3.67)	83.3 (3.28)	81.1 (3.19)	77.3 (3.04)	80.9 (3.19)	93.2 (3.67)	89.8 (3.54)	94.8 (3.73)	977.3 (38.48)
Average precipitation days (≥ 1.0 mm)	12.3	10.6	10.8	9.8	12.4	10.1	10.2	10.2	9.4	11.6	11.9	13.2	132.5
Average relative humidity (%)	89	84	79	75	77	77	76	80	84	87	88	90	82.2
Mean monthly sunshine hours	68.7	93.4	151.1	182.6	206.6	233.4	249.8	231.7	181.7	120.3	70.1	58.5	1,848
Source 1: Meteociel
Source 2: Infoclimat.fr (humidity, 1961–1990)

== Population ==
Historical population
Year	Pop.	±% p.a.
1968	9,216	—
1975	10,105	+1.32%
1982	9,951	−0.22%
1990	8,790	−1.54%
1999	8,414	−0.48%
2007	7,543	−1.36%
2012	7,052	−1.34%
2017	6,722	−0.95%
2023	6,663	−0.15%
Source: INSEE

== Town twinning ==
Luxeuil-les-Bains is twinned with:

- (United Kingdom) Wallingford, England
- Bad Wurzach, Germany

== Notable people ==
- Allann Petitjean, footballer
- Jérémy Mathieu, footballer

== See also ==
- Communes of the Haute-Saône department
