= Waldebert =

Count of Ponthieu

Saint Waldebert
- Born: unknown France
- Died: c. 668
- Venerated in: Catholic Church; Eastern Orthodox Church
- Feast: 2 May

Waldebert (died c. 668), also known as Gaubert, Valbert and Walbert, was a Frankish count of Guines, Ponthieu and Saint-Pol who became abbot of Luxeuil, and eventually a canonized saint in the Roman Catholic Church and Eastern Orthodox Church. Like several among his kinsmen, he protected the Church, enriched it with lands and founded monasteries. His brother was Faro.

Like his predecessor at Luxeuil he was born of the noble Frankish family of Duke Waldelenus of Burgundy, highly influential in seventh-century Frankish politics and served in the military before dedicating himself to the contemplative life and joining the monastery at Luxeuil on the borders of Austrasia and Burgundy (in modern-day France), where he dedicated his weapons and armour, which hung in the abbey church for centuries. He lived as a hermit close to the abbey until the death of the monastery's abbot, Eustace of Luxeuil, when Waldebert was elected Luxeuil's third abbot (c. 628).

He was abbot of the monastery for forty years, during which the school of Luxeuil trained the Frankish aristocrats who became bishops in the Frankish kingdoms; Waldebert added the Benedictine Rule to the Rule of St. Columban, though in the rule he drew up for the convent of Faremoutiers he drew upon the rules of Columbanus as well as Benedict, but made no mention whatsoever of a ritual of either profession or oblation. He also gained from Pope John IV the independence of his community from episcopal control and increased the size and prosperity of the monastery's territories and buildings. Naturally Jonas dedicated to him his vita of Columbanus. Among numerous houses founded from Luxeuil during his tenure, he was instrumental in aiding Salaberga found her convent at Laon.

After his death his wooden bowl was credited with miraculous powers.

His feast day in the Roman Church is 2 May. The basic modern study is that in J. Poinsotte, Les abbés de Luxeuil (1900). His vita is categorized as BHL 8775.
