= Jo Ann McNamara =

- Born: 1931
- Died: 2009 (aged 77–78)

Academic background
- Education: University of Pennsylvania; Columbia University (BA, MA, PhD)

Academic work
- Discipline: Historian
- Sub-discipline: Medieval history; medieval Europe; early modern Europe; Religious history; Women religious
- Institutions: Hunter College

Jo Ann Kay McNamara (1931–2009) was an American medieval historian. She was a professor emerita at Hunter College. Her research focused largely on nuns and women's agency throughout Antiquity and the Middle Ages. She also published works regarding the development of masculinity and other medieval topics.

== Biography ==
McNamara was born in Janesville, Wisconsin, and went to primary and secondary schools run by nuns. She spent two years at the University of Pennsylvania before transferring to Columbia University, where she completed her B.A., M.A., and Ph.D. degrees. She spent the rest of her life in New York City. While working towards her Ph.D., she began teaching at Hunter College in 1962, where she worked for over thirty-five years. At Hunter, McNamara participated in the Faculty Senate, helped develop the Women's Studies program, earned the Hunter College Faculty Excellence Award for Research, and became a graduate student mentor at CUNY.

Outside of her home institution, she played a leading role in the Berkshire Conferences on the History of Women, the meetings of the American Historical Association, the American Catholic Historical Association, and the Coordinating Committee of Women in the Historical Profession. Additionally, McNamara served on the advisory board of the journal Parergon, and the editorial board of the Journal of Women’s History. She also founded two research groups: Medieval Hagiography and Family History. She retired from teaching in 1998, though she would continue to publish until her death.

McNamara's most influential work was Sisters in Arms, which was published in 1996. This book has been described as "her magnum opus," and tracks monastic women in the Catholic church from the late Roman period to the modern day. The book is especially interested in demonstrating how nuns held and exercised power, even as the church hierarchy tried to deny them. McNamara also wrote The Herrenfrage in 1994, which was a seminal essay about medieval masculinity. Specifically, McNamara argued that eleventh century monks usurped masculinity from warriors. In order to solidify their claims, the monks tried to distance themselves from nuns. This led to a broader panic about women, which McNamara likened to some modern discourse around women. McNamara goes on to claim that the Herrenfrage (the man question) ended up weakening the power and status of women in the High Middle Ages, while also precipitating the Frauenfrage (the woman question).

== Published works ==
- McNamara, Jo Ann (1973) Giles Aycelin: The Servant of Two Masters. Syracuse: Syracuse University Press.
- McNamara, Jo Ann and Wemple, Suzanne (1973) "The Power of Women Through the Family in Medieval Europe: 500-1100," Feminist Studies Vol. 1, No. 3/4, Special Double Issue: Women's History, 126-141.
- McNamara, Jo Ann and Wemple, Suzanne, (1976) "Marriage and Divorce in the Frankish Kingdom," in Women in Medieval Society, edited by Susan Stuard, 95-124. Philadelphia, University of Pennsylvania Press.
- McNamara, Jo Ann (1976) "Sexual Equality and the Cult of Virginity in Early Christian Thought," Feminist Studies 3, 145-158.
- McNamara, Jo Ann and Wemple, Suzanne (1977), "Sanctity and Power: The Dual Pursuit of Medieval Women," Becoming Visible: Women in European History 1, 90-118.
- McNamara, Jo Ann (1983) A New Song: Celibate Women in the First Three Christian Centuries. New York: Haworth Press.
- McNamara, Jo Ann (1992) Sainted Women of the Dark Ages. Durham: Duke University Press.
- McNamara, Jo Ann (1994) "The Herrenfrage: The Restructuring of the Gender System, 1050-1150," in Medieval Masculinities: Regarding Men in the Middle Ages, edited by Clare Lees, 3-30. Minneapolis: University of Minnesota Press.
- McNamara, Jo Ann (1996) Sisters in Arms: Catholic Nuns Through Two Millennia. Cambridge, MA: Harvard University Press.
- McNamara, Jo Ann (2005) "The Networked Life." in Women Medievalists and the Academy, edited by Jane Chance, 901-914. Madison, University of Wisconsin Press.
