= Luxeuil Abbey =

Monastery in France

Coordinates: 47°48′59″N 6°22′53″E

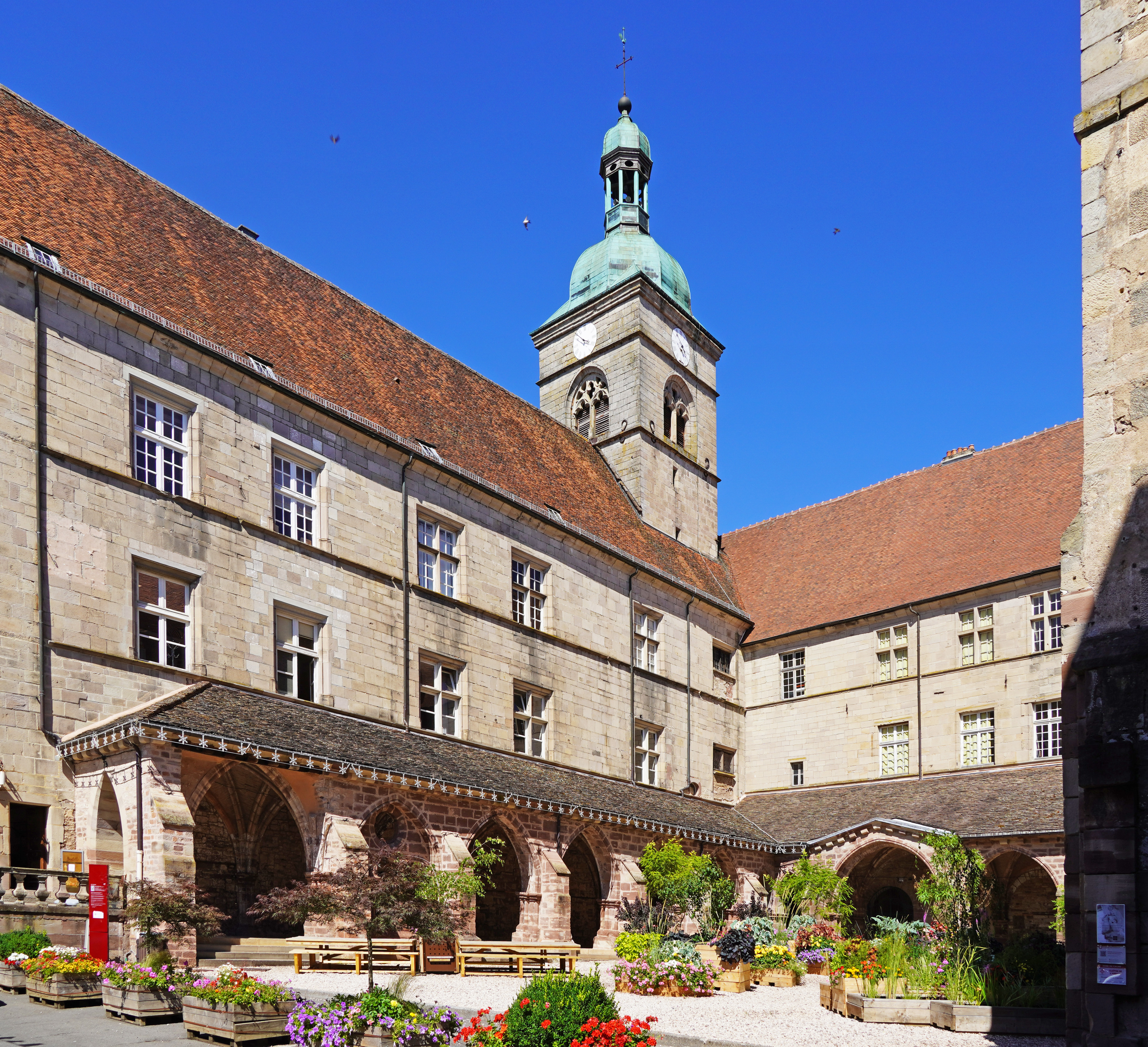
The cloister at Luxeuil Abbey

Luxeuil Abbey (French pronunciation: [lyksœj]), the Abbaye Saint-Pierre et Saint-Paul, was one of the oldest and best-known monasteries in Franche-Comté, located in what is now the département of Haute-Saône in Franche-Comté, France.

== History ==
=== Columbanus ===
The abbey was founded circa 590 by the Irish missionary Saint Columbanus. Columbanus and his companions first settled in cells at Annegray, in the commune of Voivre, Haute-Saône. Looking for a more permanent site for his community, Columbanus decided upon the ruins of a well-fortified Gallo-Roman settlement, Luxovium, about eight miles away.

The Roman town had been ravaged by Attila in 451, and was now buried in the dense overgrown woodland that had filled the abandoned site over more than a century, but the place still had the advantage of the thermal baths ("constructed with unusual skill", according to Columbanus' early biographer, Jonas of Bobbio) down in the valley, which still give the town its name of Luxeuil-les-Bains. Jonas described it further: "There stone images crowded the nearby woods, which were honoured in the miserable cult and profane former rites in the time of the pagans".

With a grant from an officer of the palace at Childebert's court, an abbey church was built with a sense of triumph within the heathen site and its "spectral haunts".

Under the intellectual and spiritual stimulation of the Irish monks, the abbey at Luxeuil, dedicated to Saint Peter, soon became the most important and flourishing monastery in Gaul. The community was so large that choir followed choir in the chanting of the office, and at Luxeuil the laus perennis imported from Agaunum went on day and night.

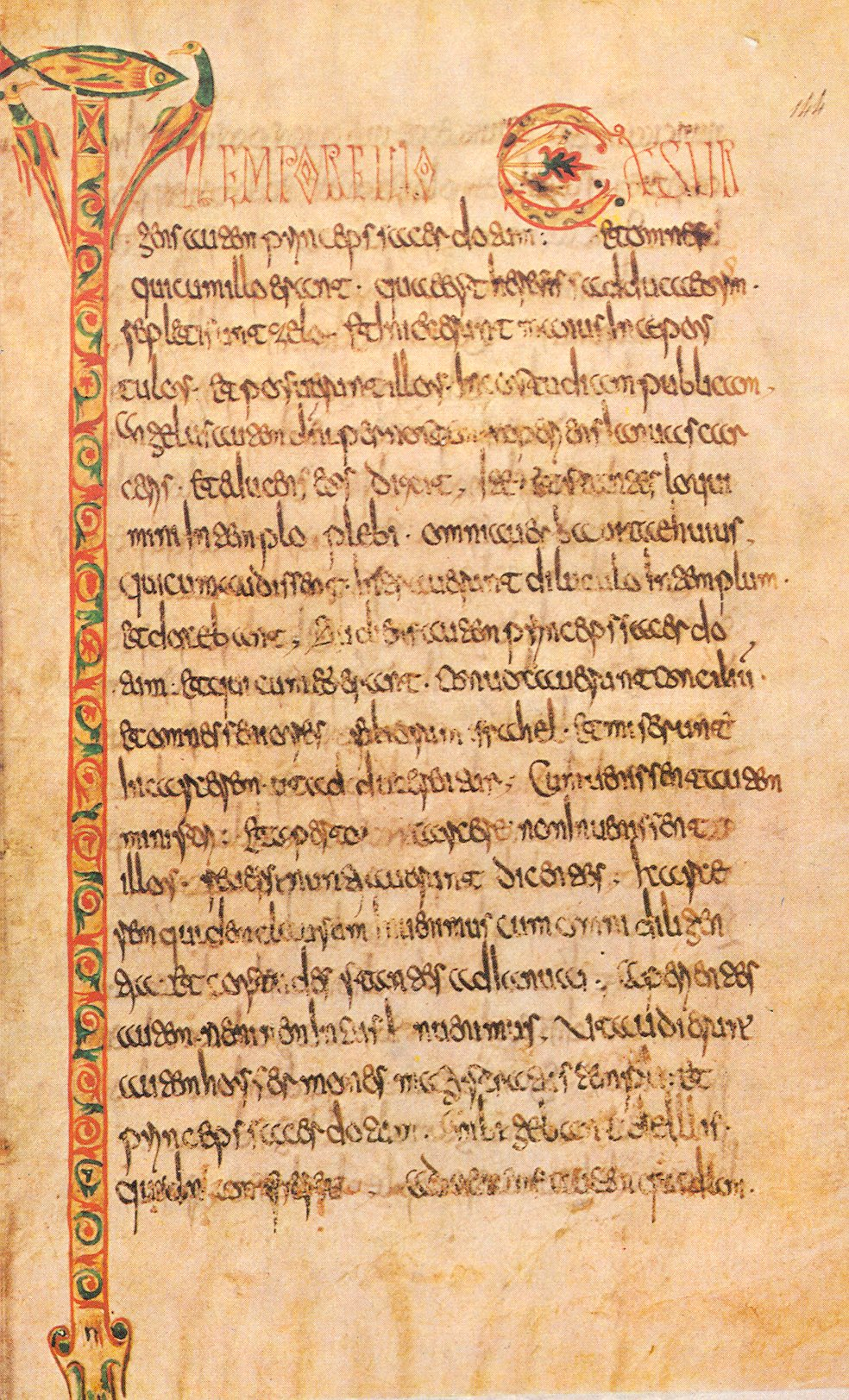
Seventh-century lectionary produced at Luxeuil.

Most of the earliest rule that was observed at Luxeuil derived from Celtic monastic traditions, whether or not written down by Columbanus, supplemented increasingly by the more formalized Benedictine Rule that was followed throughout the West, which provided for the abbot's orderly election, his relations with his monks, and the appointment of monastic officials and their delegated powers. In 603, a synod accused Columbanus of keeping Easter by the Celtic date, but his severity and the inflexible rule he had established may have been the true cause of friction with the Burgundian court.

=== Eustace of Luxeuil ===
Columbanus was exiled from Luxeuil by Theuderic II of Austrasia and the dowager Queen Brunehaut. He was succeeded as abbot by Saint Eustace of Luxeuil, the head of the monastic school, which under Eustace and his successor Saint Waldebert, established a high reputation. The extensive library and the great scriptorium are first attested under Abbot Waldebert (629–670).

The school and example of Luxeuil contributed significantly to the conversion of the Burgundians. Luxeuil sent out monks to found houses at Bobbio, between Milan and Genoa, where Columbanus himself became abbot, and monasteries at Saint-Valéry and Remiremont. To Luxeuil came such monks as Conon, abbot of Lérins Abbey to prepare for the reform of his monastery, and Saints Wandregisel and Philibert, founders respectively of the abbeys of Fontenelle and Jumièges in Normandy, who spent years in studying the rule observed in monasteries which derived their origin from Luxeuil.

=== Saracen, Viking and Hungarian raids ===
Luxeuil went into decline in the middle of the eighth century. Its book production ceased and there may have been a long vacancy in the abbotship. It is possible it was the victim of violence, but this is not supported by any near contemporary account. In 816, under the reforming government of the eighteenth abbot, Saint Ansegisus, the Emperor Louis the Pious renewed its charters, restored the church and monastic buildings, and reformed discipline. The monastery and the small town that clustered around its walls were devastated by the Vikings in about 886. In 917, it was sacked by the Hungarians.

=== Modern period ===
From the 15th century the institution of non-resident commendatory abbots encouraged the decline of discipline. The Emperor Charles V curtailed the power of Luxeuil's abbots.

In 1634, however, the commendatory abbots ceased, and Luxeuil was joined to the reformed Congregation of St. Vanne. From the report of the "Commission des Réguliers", drawn up in 1768, the community appears to have been numerous and flourishing, and discipline well kept.

=== French Revolution ===
At the French Revolution the monks were dispersed. Most of the abbey's site is built over by the modern town, but the fine Gothic church, built in the 14th century, was not destroyed; neither were the cloisters and conventual buildings, which until the "Association Laws" of 1901 were used as a seminary for the diocese of Besançon, and still remain in existence. The church itself, now known as the Basilica of St. Pierre (Basilique Saint-Pierre), has for many years served as the parish church of Luxeuil-les-Bains.

== List of abbots ==
For a list of abbots, see Henri Baumont, Étude historique sur l'abbaye de Luxeuil (590–1790) (Luxeuil, 1895), appendix I.

- 590–610 : St Columbanus
- 610–625 : Eustace
- 625–670 : St Waldebert
- 670–6?? : Vindologus
- 6??–665 : Berthoald
- 665–682 : Ingofrid
- 682–6?? : Cunctan
- 6??–6?? : Rusticus
- 6??–700 : Sayfrocius (Sayfarius)
- 700–7?? : Ado
- 7??–7?? : Arulf
- 7??–7?? : Rendinus
- 7??–7?? : Regnebert
- 7??–7?? : Gerard I
- 7??–7?? : Ratto
- 7??–730 : Vinlincrannus (Vuikeranus)
- 730–731 : St Mellinus
- 731–746 : vacancy
- 746–7?? : Frudoald
- 7??–7?? : Gaylembus
- 7??–764 : Airibrand
- 764–7?? : Boso
- 7??–785 : Grimoald
- 785–786 : Andrew I
- 786–7?? : Docto
- 7??–8?? : Siliernus
- 8??–817 : Dadinus
- 817–834 : St Ansegisus
- 834–834 : Drogo
- 834–855 : Fulbert
- 856–888 : St Gibart
- ???–??? : Eudes I
- 948–983 : Guy I
- 983–1018 : Aalongus
- 1018–10?? : Milo
- 10??–1049 : William I
- 1049–10?? : Gerard II
- 10??–10?? : Roger
- 10??–10?? : Robert
- 10??–10?? : Guy II
- 1090–1023 : Thibaud I
- 1123–1136 : Hugh I
- 1136–1139 : Josserand
- 1139–1147 : Stephen I
- 1147–1160 : Gerard III
- 1160–1165 : Peter I
- 1165–1178 : Sifroi
- 1178–1186 : Bouchard
- 1186–1189 : Gerard IV
- 1189–1201 : Olivier d'Abbans
- 1201–1204 : Frederick
- 1204–1209 : Hervé
- 1209–1219 : Hugh II
- 1219–1234 : Simon
- 1234–1265 : Thibaud II
- 1265–12?? : Régnier
- 12??–1271 : Hugh III
- 1271–1287 : Charles I
- 1287–1308 : Thibaud III de Faucogney
- 1308–1314 : Stephen II
- 1314–1319 : vacancy
- 1319–1345 : Eudes II de Châtillon
- 1345–1351 : Fromond de Corcondray
- 1351–1363 : Guillaume II de Saint-Germain
- 1364–1382 : Aymon de Mollans
- 1382–1416 : Guillaume III de Bussul
- 1416–1416 : Pierre II de Lugney
- 1416–1424 : Étienne III Pierrecy de L'Isle
- 1424–1427 : Guy III Pierrecy de L'Isle
- 1427–1431 : Jean I d'Ungelles
- 1431–1449 : Guy IV Briffaut
- 1449–1468 : Jean II Jouffroy
- 1468–1495 : Antoine I de Neuchâtel
- 1495–1533 : Jean III de La Palud de Varambon
- 1534–1541 : François I de La Palud de Varambon
- 1542–1560 : François II Bonvalot
- 1560–1586 : Antoine II Perrenot de Granvelle
- 1587–1600 : Louis de Madruce
- 1600–1601 : André II d'Autriche
- 1601–1622 : Antoine III de La Baume
- 1622–1631 : Philippe de La Baume
- 1633–1642 : Jérôme Coquelin
- 1642–1671 : Jean–Baptiste Ier Clerc
- 1671–1671 : Claude–Paul de Bauffremont
- 1671–1671 : Emmanuel Privey
- 1671–1680 : Jean–Baptiste II Joseph-Hyacinthe de Bauffremont
- 1680–1733 : Charles II Emmanuel de Bauffremont
- 1733–1741 : vacancy
- 1741–1743 : René de Rohan-Soubise
- 1743–1790 : Jean IV Louis-Aynard de Clermont-Tonnerre

== See also ==
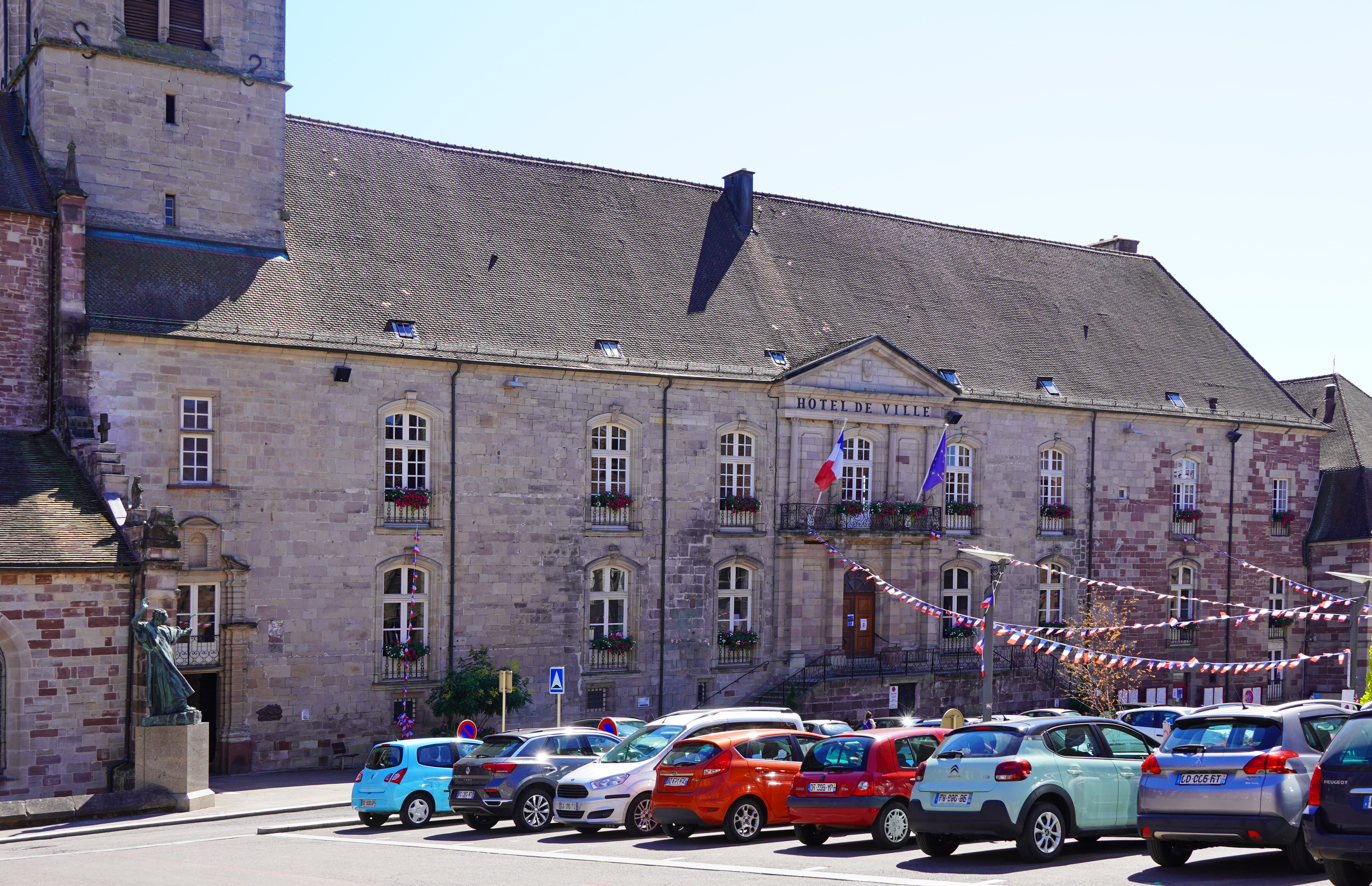
Abbatial palace at Luxeuil

- List of Merovingian monasteries
- Merovingian architecture
- Merovingian art
