= Remiremont Abbey =

Abbey located in Vosges, France

Coordinates: 48°0′56″N 6°35′29″E

Imperial Abbey of Remiremont Abbaye impériale de Remiremont (fr) Reichskloster Romberg (de)
- 1290–1790
- Coat of arms

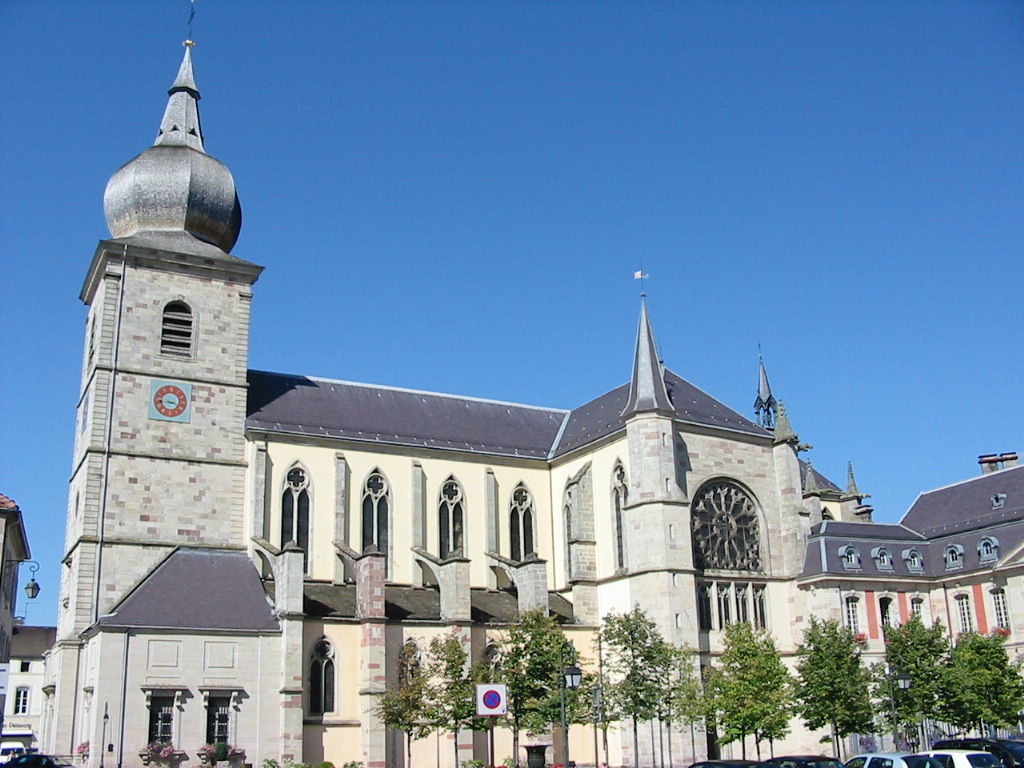
- Status: Imperial Abbey
- Capital: Remiremont Abbey
- Government: Principality
- Historical era: Middle Ages
  - Abbey founded: 620
  - Became Reichsfrei: 1290
  - War of the Escutcheons: 1566
  - Disestablished: 1790
Preceded by	Succeeded by
Duchy of Lorraine	Early modern France

Remiremont Abbey was an abbey that was founded as a house of nuns near Remiremont, Vosges, France. It later became a community of secular canonesses.

== History ==
It was founded about 620 by Romaric (580–653), a lord at the court of Chlothar II, who, having been converted by Amatus (570–625), a monk of Luxeuil, took the habit at Luxeuil. Together they established a double monastery on Saint-Mont (Mount Haberd), overlooking the Moselle valley. They followed the Rule of St. Columbanus and practiced the Laus perennis, the continuous chanting of the Office by alternating choirs. Among the abbots were Ame, Romaric, and Adelphus (d. 670). Among the abbesses were Mactefelda (d. c. 622), Claire (d. c. 652) and Gébétrude (d. c. 673). Around 640, Bishop Arnulf of Metz, progenitor of the Arnulfing and Carolingian dynasty, died near Habendum, and was buried in the monastery until his remains were later translated to Metz Cathedral.

=== Benedictines ===
The men's monastery disappeared perhaps during the 9th century. Around 818, the nuns adopted the more flexible Rule of St. Benedict and settled in the Moselle valley below. They kept the name of the founder, Romarici Mons (Romaric's mount) which later became "Remiremont". A market town grew around the monastery. In the Middle Ages, its estate was the largest in the region.

=== Canonesses ===
Gradually, the women at Remiremont stopped following the Benedictine rule and became secular canonesses, who did not take perpetual vows, and were free to resign their prebendary and marry. Remiremont was very exclusive. Canonesses were admitted from those who could give proof of 200 years of noble descent. Enriched by the Dukes of Lorraine, the kings of France and the Holy Roman Emperors, the canonesses of Remiremont attained great power. The canonesses lived independently within the abbey with their own circle of friends and servants. As prebends, they each received a share of the abbey's considerable income to dispose of as they wished, and could leave to visit family, sometimes for months at a time.

The abbey church consecrated by Pope Leo IX in 1051, at which time he granted Remiremont exemption from episcopal oversight, reporting to the Pope. In token of his, every three years the abbess would send to Rome a white horse draped with a purple cloth. At the time of Rudolph of Habsburg (1290), the abbess was raised to the status of Imperial Princess. On Whit Monday the neighboring parishes paid homage to the collegiate chapter in a ceremony called the Kyriolés (canticles in the vernacular).

On their accession, the Dukes of Lorraine became de facto suzerains of the abbey and had to come to Remiremont to swear to continue their protection. The "War of the Escutcheons" (French: panonceaux) in 1566 between the duke and the abbess ended in favor of the duke, and the abbess never recovered her former position. In order to demonstrate their Imperial immediacy and their independence from the Dukes of Lorraine, the canonesses of the abbey mounted escutcheons around the town displaying the Imperial eagle. Charles III, Duke of Lorraine, took advantage of the absence of Emperor Maximilian II, away campaigning in Hungary, to remove the escutcheons by force and establish his de facto sovereignty.

In the 17th century the canonesses of Remiremont took the title of countesses. In church they wore long white mantles trimmed with ermine. They were obliged to live at the abbey three months in the year in gentile houses built in a large enclosure around the church. Many kept carriages and gave balls, concerts, and other entertainments.

Catherine of Lorraine was an abbess from 1612 to 1648. The office was to be given to her niece, Marguerite, but she married Gaston, Duke of Orléans. The couple's second daughter, Élisabeth Marguerite d'Orléans, became titular abbess, as was Princess Élisabeth Charlotte of Lorraine. Béatrice Hiéronyme de Lorraine was also abbess. Anne Charlotte de Lorraine, was an abbess from 1738 until 1773. Maria Christina of Saxony, sister to the Dauphine Marie Josèphe, was abbess after Anne Charlotte from 1773 until 1782. From 1782 until 1786 it was ruled by Princess Charlotte of Lorraine.

The last abbess, under the Ancien Régime from 1786 until 1790, was Louise Adélaïde de Bourbon, the daughter of Louis Joseph, Prince of Condé. She was prioress of the Monastery of the Temple at her death in 1824.

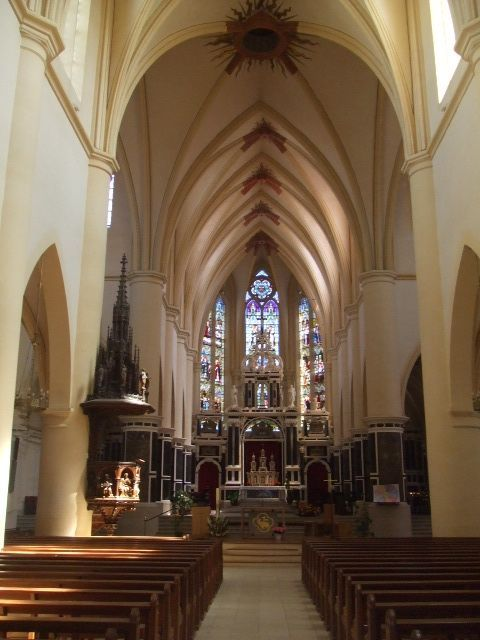
Interior of the abbey.

== See also ==
- Category:Abbesses of Remiremont
- List of Carolingian monasteries
- Carolingian architecture
- Carolingian art
