= Hiberno-Scottish mission =

Medieval Irish and Scottish Christian mission

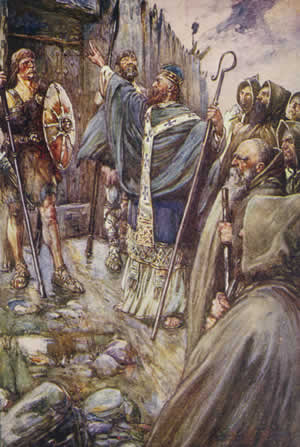
Saint Columba during a mission to the Picts

The Hiberno-Scottish mission was a series of expeditions in the 6th and 7th centuries by Gaelic missionaries originating from Ireland that spread Celtic Christianity in Scotland, Wales, England and Merovingian lands. Catholic Christianity spread first within Ireland. Since the 8th and 9th centuries, these early missions were called 'Celtic Christianity'.

The mission was not coordinated from a single center, but involved centuries of self-determined Irish missionaries. As a whole, Celtic-speaking areas were part of Latin Christendom at a time when there was significant regional variation of liturgy and structure, but a general collective veneration of the Papacy was no less intense in Celtic-speaking areas. Both Protestants and Catholics in Ireland have honored the Hiberno-Scottish mission as their own heritage.

== Etymology ==
Hibernia is the Latin name for the island of Ireland.

The Latin term Scotti refers to the Gaelic-speaking people of Ireland and western Scotland. From this term, developed an alternate Latin name for the territory in which the Scotti lived: Scotia.

Schottenklöster (German for 'Scottish monasteries') is the name applied to the Bible schools established by Gaelic missionaries in Continental Europe, particularly to those in Germany that became Benedictine monasteries. Ireland's sobriquet "Island of Saints and Scholars" derives from this period.

== Columba in Scotland ==
Columba was an Irish prince born in 521 and educated at the Bible school at Clonard. At the age of 25, Columba’s first mission involved the establishment of a school at Derry. Following this, Columba spent seven years allegedly establishing over 300 churches and church schools. Adamnan says of Columba:

He could not pass the space even of a single hour without applying himself either to prayer, or reading, or writing, or else to some manual labor.

In 563, Columba sailed to Scotland with about 200 other missionaries hoping to spread Celtic Christianity among the largely pagan Picts. The lord of the island of Mull, a Gael of Dál Riada, was a relative of Columba and granted the missionaries ownership of Iona, where they established a Bible school. Bede writes that Columba converted the Picts to the word of God, suggesting that Bible teaching was the central means of conversion. Students routinely studied for 18 years before ordination, an indicator of the depth of theological learning required by the Celtic Church. This school remained Celtic until they were driven out by the Benedictines in 1204.

=== See also ===
- Saint Blane
- Cathan
- Maccai

== Dunod in Wales ==
Dunod was a disciple of Columba who established a Bible school at Bangor-on-Dee in 560. The school had such a large student body that seven deans presided over at least 300 students each. The mission's conflict with Augustine is noteworthy. Pope Gregory I "invested Augustine with jurisdiction over all the bishops of the British Church" when he arrived in Britain in 597.

Neander writes:

"The abbot of the most distinguished British monastery, at Bangor, Deynoch by name, whose opinion in ecclesiastical affairs had the most weight with his countrymen, when urged by Augustin to submit in all things to the ordinances of the Roman Church, gave him the following remarkable answer: “We are all ready to listen to the church of God, to the pope at Rome, and to every pious Christian, that so we may show to each, according to his station, perfect love, and uphold him by word and deed. We know not, that any other obedience can be required of us towards him whom you call the pope or the father of fathers.”

Representatives from Bangor attended two conferences with Augustine, at which they declared “that they could not depart from their ancient customs without the consent and leave of their people” and that they could not accept the supremacy of the pope “nor receive [Augustine] as their archbishop”. Dunod asserted his independence from Augustine on the grounds that they adhered to what their holy fathers held before them, who were the friends of God and the followers of the apostles.

In Wales, Celtic Christianity long maintained its position with its peculiar ideas and exceptional beliefs. The Bible school at Bangor was destroyed in 613 by King Æthelfrith.

== Aidan in England ==
Aidan was educated at Iona. In 634, King Oswald invited Aidan to the Northumbrian court to teach the doctrines of Celtic Christianity. Oswald granted Aidan the island of Lindisfarne for a Bible school. Upon his death in 651, Aidan was succeeded by Finan and then by Colman, both of whom had been educated at Iona.

From Northumbria, Aidan's mission spread throughout the Anglo-Saxon kingdoms and similar Bible schools were established in Bernicia, Deira, Mercia and East Anglia. It is estimated that two thirds of the Anglo-Saxon population were converted to Celtic Christianity at this time.

== Columbanus in Francia ==
Columbanus was born in 543 and studied at Bangor Abbey until c. 590, when he travelled to the continent with twelve companions, including Attala, Columbanus the Younger, Gallus, and Domgal.

The mission was welcomed by King Guntram of Burgundy and schools were established at Anegray, Luxeuil and Fontaines. When Theuderic II expelled Columbanus from Burgundy in 610, Columbanus established Mehrerau Abbey at Bregenz with the support of Theudebert II. When Theuderic II conquered Austrasia in 612, Columbanus fled to Lombardy, where he was welcomed by King Agilulf. In 614, he established a school at Bobbio.

During the 7th century, the disciples of Columbanus and other Gaelic missionaries founded several monasteries in what are now France, Germany, Belgium, and Switzerland. The best known are: St. Gall in Switzerland, Disibodenberg in the Rhine Palatinate, Palatium at Besançon, Lure and Cusance in the Diocese of Besançon, Bèze in the Diocese of Langres, Remiremont Abbey and Moyenmoutier Abbey in the Diocese of Toul, Fosses-la-Ville in the Diocese of Liège, Mont Saint-Quentin at Péronne, Ebersmunster in Lower Alsace, St. Martin's at Cologne, the Scots Monastery, Regensburg, Vienna, Erfurt and Würzburg.

In Italy, Fiesole produced Saint Donatus of Fiesole and Andrew the Scot of Fiesole. Another early Schottenkloster was Säckingen in Baden, founded by the Irish missionary Fridolin of Säckingen who is said to have founded another at Konstanz. Other Hiberno-Scottish missionaries active at the time, predominantly in Swabia, were Wendelin of Trier, Saint Kilian, Arbogast, Landelin, Trudpert, Pirmin (founded Reichenau abbey), Saint Gall (Abbey of St. Gall), Corbinian, Emmeram and Rupert of Salzburg.

== After Columbanus (8th to 13th centuries) ==
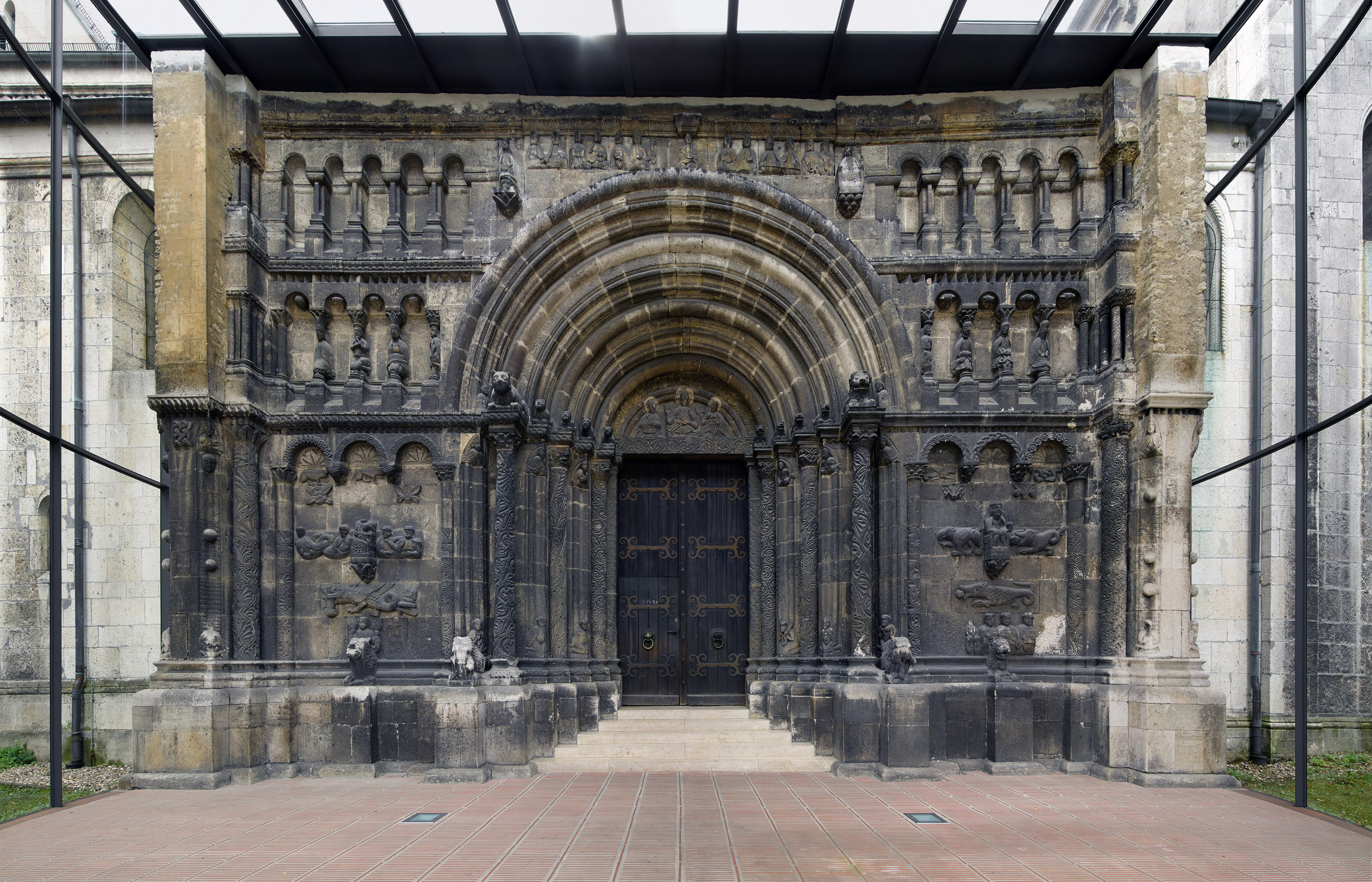
Schottenportal at the Scottish Monastery, Regensburg

Hiberno-Scottish activity in Europe continued after the death of Columbanus. There were monastic foundations in Anglo-Saxon England, the first in about 630 at "Cnobheresburgh", an unknown place in East Anglia but possibly Burgh Castle mentioned by Bede. Others such as Malmesbury Abbey, perhaps Bosham, and Glastonbury Abbey had strong Irish links. The profile of Iona declined, and from 698 until the reign of Charlemagne in the 770s, the Hiberno-Scottish efforts in the Frankish Empire were continued by the Anglo-Saxon mission – see Germanic Christianity.

Irish monks known as Papar are said to have been present in Iceland before its settlement from AD 874 onwards by the Norse. The oldest source mentioning the Papar is the Íslendingabók ("Book of the Icelanders"), between 1122 and 1133. The book states that the Norse found Irish priests, with bells and crosiers, at Iceland at the time of their arrival. Such figures are also mentioned in the Icelandic Landnámabók ("Book of Settlements", possibly going back to the early 12th century).

Among the Irish monks who were active in Central Europe were two particularly important theologians, Marianus Scotus and Johannes Scotus Eriugena. Legends of Irish foundations are recorded in a Middle High German text known as Charlemagne and the Scottish [Irish] Saints (Shaw, 1981).

The rule of St. Columbanus, which was originally followed in most of these monasteries, was soon superseded by that of St. Benedict. Later Gaelic missionaries founded Honau in Baden (about 721), Murbach in Upper Alsace (about 727), Altomünster in Upper Bavaria (about 749), while other Gaelic monks restored St. Michel in Thiérache (940), Walsort near Namur (945), and, at Cologne, the Monasteries of St. Clement (about 953), St. Martin (about 980), St. Symphorian (about 990), and St. Pantaléon (1042).

=== Schottenklöster in Germany ===
Towards the end of the 11th and in the 12th century, a number of Schottenklöster, intended for Irish monks exclusively, sprang up in Germany. About 1075, three monks, Marianus, Iohannus, and Candidus, took up their abode at the little Church of Weih Sankt Peter at Regensburg. Their number soon increased and a larger monastery was built for them (about 1090) by Burgrave Otto of Regensburg and his brother Henry. This became the famous Scots Monastery of St. James in Regensburg, the mother-house of a series of other Schottenklöster. It founded the Abbeys of St. James at Würzburg (about 1134), St. Aegidius at Nuremberg (1140), St. James at Constance (1142), Our Blessed Lady at Vienna (1158), St. Nicolas at Memmingen (1168), Holy Cross at Eichstätt (1194), and the Priory of Kelheim (1231). These, together with the Abbey of St. James at Erfurt (1036), and the Priory of Weih-St-Peter at Ratisbon formed the famous congregation of the German Schottenklöster which was erected by Innocent III in 1215, with the Abbot of St. James at Ratisbon as abbot-general.

== 14th century onwards ==
In the 14th and 15th centuries, most of these monasteries were on the decline, partly for want of Irish monks, and partly on account of great laxity of discipline and financial difficulties.

In consequence, the abbeys of Nuremberg and Vienna were withdrawn from the Irish congregation and repeopled by German monks in 1418. St. James's Abbey, Würzburg, was left without any monks after the death of Abbot Philip in 1497. It was then re-peopled by German monks and in 1506 joined the congregation of Bursfeld.

In 1595, however, it was granted to the Scottish congregation and occupied by Scottish monks until its suppression in 1803. The abbey of Constance began to decline in the first half of the 15th century and was suppressed in 1530. That of Memmingen also disappeared during the early period of the Protestant Reformation in the following century.

The Abbey of Holy Cross at Eichstatt seems to have ceased early in the 14th century. In consequence of the Protestant Reformation in Scotland many Scottish Benedictines left their country and took refuge in the Schottenklöster of Germany during the 16th century.

The Scottish monasteries in Ratisbon, Erfurt, and Würzburg again began to flourish temporarily, but all endeavours to regain the monasteries of Nuremberg, Vienna, and Constance for monks of Scottish nationality failed.

In 1692, Abbot Placidus Flemming of Ratisbon reorganized the Scottish congregation which now comprised the monasteries of Ratisbon Regensburg, Erfurt, and Würzburg, the only remaining Schottenklöster in Germany. He also erected a seminary in connection with the monastery at Ratisbon.

But the forced secularization of monasteries in 1803 put an end to the Scottish abbeys of Erfurt and Würzburg, leaving St. James's at Ratisbon as the only surviving Schottenkloster in Germany. Since 1827 this monastery was again permitted to accept novices but the number of its monks dwindled down to two capitulars in 1862.

There being no hope of any increase, Pope Pius IX suppressed this last Schottenkloster in his brief of 2 September 1862. Its revenues were distributed between the diocesan seminary of Ratisbon and the Scots College at Rome.

== Historiography ==
James Ussher, an early Anglo-Irish leader of the Protestant Church of Ireland, attempted to appropriate Columbanus and the later Irish missions as part of an early Irish legacy of opposition to the Papacy. For Ussher, early modern Anglicanism was only a return to the original "Celtic" principles found in the era of the missions. In his 1632 Veterum epistolarum Hibernicarum sylloge, Ussher emphasized "the robust, even rude, attitude that Columbanus took towards papal authority." Irish Catholics, in response, continued to take pride in the Irish missions as their own legacy. The Anglican and Irish churches continued to battle over ownership of the Irish mission, culminating in the 1930s in the writing of Church of Ireland bishop William Kerr. However, this sectarian rivalry came to an end in the 1960s with a new, more careful approach towards the theology of the Irish missionaries.

== See also ==
- Gaelic Ireland
- Anglo-Saxon mission
- Culdee
- Schottenstift, Vienna
- Pirmin
- Quartodecimanism
- Christianisation of Anglo-Saxon England
- Gregorian mission
