= Agrestius of Luxeuil =

Burgundian Frankish nobleman and monk

Agrestius (died 628) was a Burgundian Frankish nobleman and monk.

Agrestius was the notary (notarius) of King Theuderic II, probably until the king's death in 613. Following the accession of Chlothar II, he entered the monastery of Luxeuil, founded by the Irish monk Columban in 590. Since Columban had been forced into exile by Theuderic, the monastery was under the leadership of Eustace. Eustace sent Agrestius on a mission to evangelize (or reform the church) in Bavaria, a mission which Eustace had himself undertaken previously. According to Jonas of Bobbio, an opponent of Agrestius, the mission was a failure. It was, however, during his return from Bavaria through Italy that Agrestius became persuaded to take the side of the church of Aquileia, in opposition to that of Rome, in the so-called schism of the Three Chapters. Columban himself had been initially sympathetic to the Aquileians, perhaps under the influence of his patron, Queen Theodelinda, before finally siding with Rome.

Agrestius wrote a letter to Attala, Columban's successor as abbot of Bobbio, denouncing his adherence to Rome. When this protest failed to gain traction, he took his grievance to Eustace, who at first received him cordially but ultimately excommunicated him. The dispute over the correct interpretation of the Columbanian tradition occupied Agrestius and Eustace into the 620s. Although Jonas, Columban's biographer, writing in the early 640s, portrays Agrestius as a new Judas and Cain, modern scholars consider it likely that his views were closer to those of Columban than were those of Eustace. Agrestius also attacked the Rule of Columban, the norm by which the community of Luxeuil lived.

Agrestius' aristocratic connections brought him powerful allies, including Warnachar II, the Burgundian mayor of the palace. He even wrote a petition to Chlothar II, which resulted in a synod being held in Mâcon in 626 or 627 to adjudicate the dispute. This itself was under the auspices of Agrestius' uncle, Abelenus, (Note: Abelenus may be the same person as the count of that name who was among the leaders of the army of the Transjura (de pago Ultraiurano) that fought the Alemanni in 609/10.) then bishop of Geneva.

A year after the synod, Agrestius was murdered by one of his servants.

== Sources ==
- Dumézil, Bruno (2007). "L'affaire Agrestius de Luxeuil: hérésie et régionalisme dans la Burgondie du VII^{e} siècle". Médiévales. 52 (52): 135–52. doi:10.4000/medievales.2503.
- Fox, Yaniv (2014). Power and Religion in Merovingian Gaul: Columbanian Monasticism and the Frankish Elites. Cambridge University Press.
- O'Hara, Alexander (2018). Jonas of Bobbio and the Legacy of Columbanus: Sanctity and Community in the Seventh Century. Oxford University Press.
- Reimitz, Helmut (2015). History, Frankish Identity and the Framing of Western Ethnicity, 550–850. Cambridge University Press.
- Wood, Ian (2014). "Religion in Pre-Carolingian Thuringia and Bavaria". In Janine Fries-Knoblach; Heiko Steuer; John Hines (eds.). The Baiuvarii and Thuringi: An Ethnographic Perspective. Boydell. pp. 317–30.
