= Bertulf of Bobbio =

Saint Bertulf

Abbot of Bobbio
- Born: unknown
- Died: 640
- Venerated in: Roman Catholic Church; Eastern Orthodox Church
- Feast: August 19

Bertulf (died 640) was the third abbot of the monastery of Bobbio.

== Life ==
Bertulf was the son of an Austrasian nobleman and a near relative of Arnulf of Metz, whose example had such an influence on Bertulf that he became a Christian and in 620 entered the monastery of Luxeuil.

A few years later he became acquainted with Abbot Attala, who had come to Luxeuil on a visit, and, with permission of Abbot Eustace of Luxeuil, accompanied Attala back to Bobbio in Italy. Upon the death of Attala in 627, Bertulf was elected by the monks of Bobbio as their abbot. Like his predecessor, he insisted on the observance of the austere rule introduced by Columbanus, the founder of Bobbio Abbey, and preached fearlessly against Arianism, which had gained a firm foothold in Italy under the Lombard kings.

In 628, the Bishop of Tortona endeavoured to bring Bobbio under his own jurisdiction. Bertulf hastened to Rome, where Pope Honorius I received him kindly and granted the monastery entire exemption from episcopal jurisdiction, and subject directly to the Papal See. Jonas, a monk of Bobbio, who accompanied Bertulf on his journey to Rome, relates that, while returning to his monastery, Bertulf was attacked by a deadly fever, and cured miraculously by Peter. The same author ascribes a few other miracles to the prayers of Bertulf.

Bertulf served seventeen years as abbot and died on August 19, 640. He is buried in the crypt of the Basilica of San Colombano. Most martyrologies give him the title of saint. His feast is celebrated on August 19.
