= San Columbano =

San Columbano is the Italian form of Saint Columbanus.

It is also the name of:

- the Italian town formerly called Mombrione
- San Columbano Abbey, a territorial abbey in Italy
