= Cumianus =

Irish monk

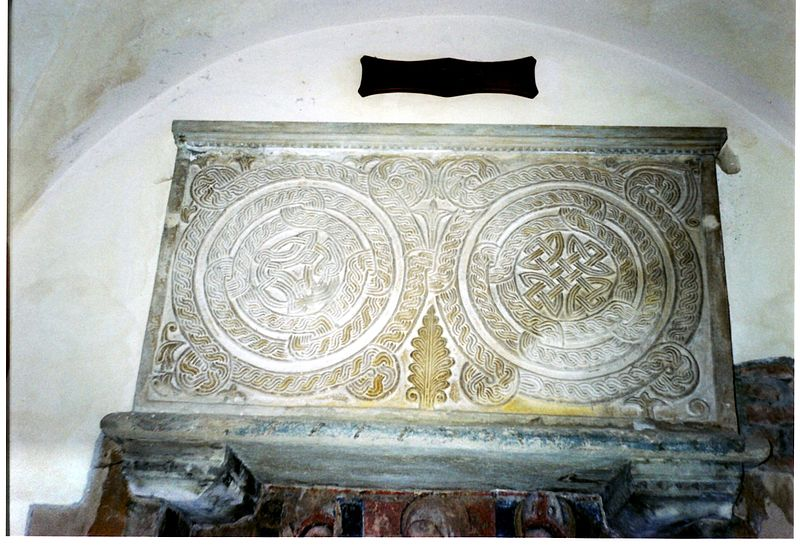

Cumianus (c. 641 – c. 736) was an Irish monk who became abbot of San Colombano di Bobbio around 715. He left Ireland as an old man. The intricately carved lid of his sarcophagus, containing a lengthy epitaph, was made by one Master John and commissioned by King Liutprand, King of the Lombards.

The inscription on the tomb reads as follows; it is written in rhythmic hexameters, a kind of hexameter in which word accent is taken into account rather than syllable length:

Hic sacra beati membra Cumiani solvuntur,
cuius coelum penetrans anima cum angelis gaudet.
iste fuit magnus dignitate, genere, forma.
hunc misit Scotia fines ad Italicos senem:
locatus Ebobio Domini constrictus amore,
ubi venerandi dogma Columbani servando
vigilans, jejunans, indefessus, sedulo orans
Olympiades quatuor uniusque curriculo anni
sic vixit feliciter, ut felix modo credatur,
mitis, prudens, pius, fratribus pacificus cunctis.
huic aetatis anni fuerunt nonies deni,
lustrum quoque unum mense(n)sque quatuor simul.
at pater egregie potens intercessor existe
pro gloriosissimo Luitprando rege, qui tuum
pretioso lapide tympum decoravit devotus,
sit ut manifestum, almum ubi tegitur corpus.

"Here lie the sacred limbs of Cumian;
whose soul, entering heaven, rejoices with the angels.
He was great in dignity, nobility, and beauty.
Ireland sent him as an old man to the lands of Italy:
located in Bobbio, constrained by love of the Lord,
where, by preserving the teaching of the venerable Columban,
keeping watch, fasting, tireless, constantly praying,
for four olympiads and the course of one year
he lived so felicitously that he is believed to be only fortunate,
gentle, wise, pious, peaceful to all brothers.
He lived for 90 years
and one period of five years and four months altogether.
But, most excellent Father, be a powerful intercessor
for the most glorious King Liutprand, who
has devotedly decorated your tomb with precious stone,
so that it may be manifest where your kindly body is buried."
