= Brugnato Cathedral =

Cathedral in Brugnato, La Spezia, Italy

Coordinates: 44°14′12.30″N 9°43′26.20″E

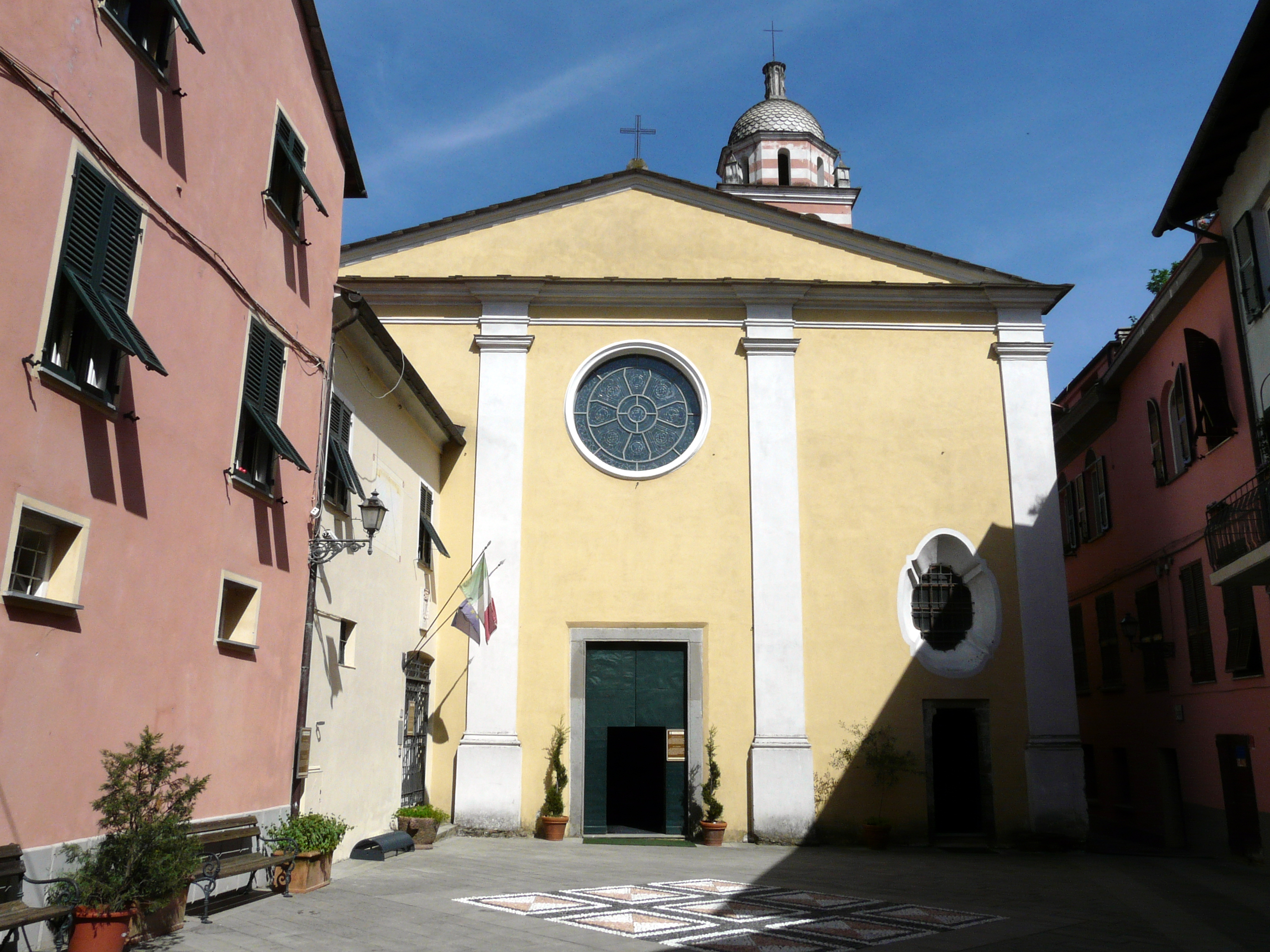
West front

Brugnato Cathedral (Italian: Duomo di Brugnato; Concattedrale dei Santi Pietro, Lorenzo e Colombano) is a Roman Catholic cathedral located in the old centre of the city of Brugnato, in the Val di Vara in the province of La Spezia, Italy. The dedication is to Saint Peter, Saint Laurence and Saint Columbanus. Once the seat of the bishops of Brugnato, it is now a co-cathedral in the Diocese of La Spezia-Sarzana-Brugnato.

== History ==
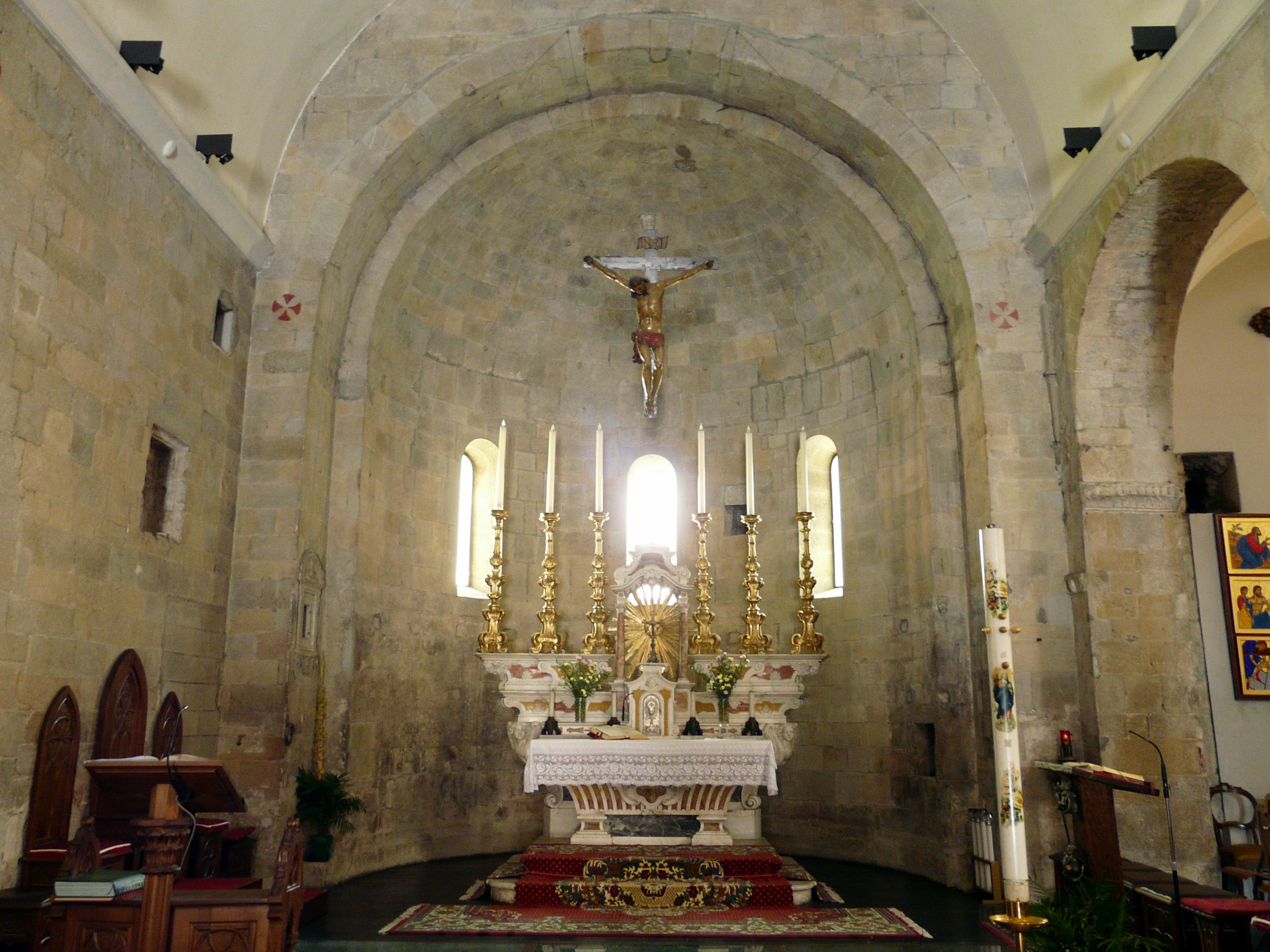
The high altar

According to some sources, supported by finds in the foundations, the first religious building on the site was constructed in the 7th century over a palaeochristian necropolis, the church of a monastery dependent on Bobbio Abbey, founded by and dedicated to Saint Columbanus. It was rebuilt in the 11th-12th centuries, passed to a resident community of Benedictine monks, and became in 1133 the seat of the diocese of Brugnato (suffragan of the Archdiocese of Genoa) which had spiritual authority over the middle and upper Val di Vara.

With the arrival of the Ghibellines during the 14th century, and the consequent flight of the bishop, who took refuge in Pontremoli, the cathedral lost importance, although it remained as the church of the abbey of the Benedictine community. In 1820 the diocese was merged into those of La Spezia and Sarzana-Luni to form a single diocese with its seat in La Spezia, leaving the abbey church with the title of "co-cathedral".

Restoration work in the 1950s brought about the rediscovery of the remains of the original Romanesque church which were the objects of study in 1994 when archaeological excavations conducted by the archaeological authorities of Liguria revealed the ancient perimeter walls, the floors and a baptismal font beneath the centre of the nave.

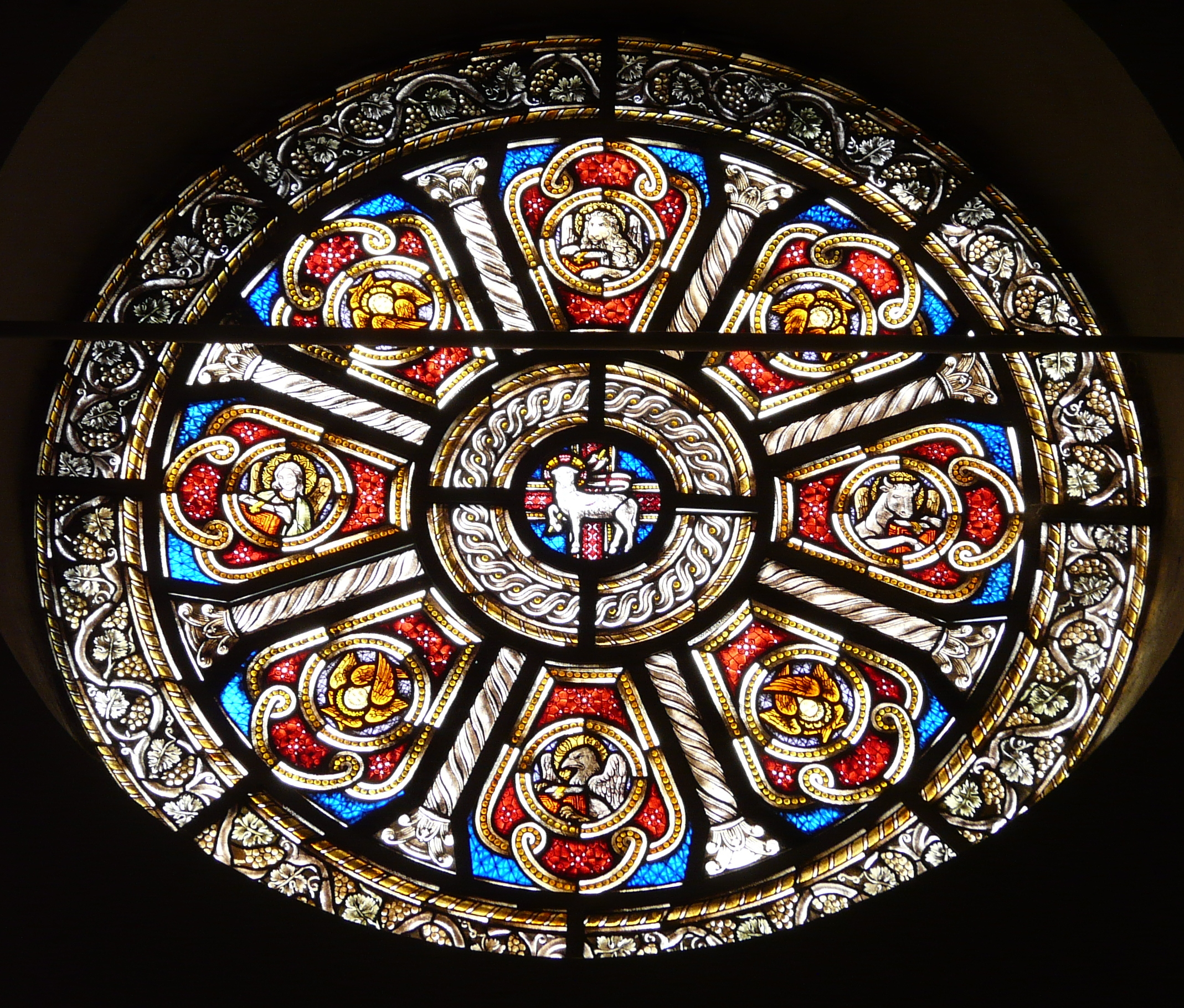
Stained glass in the rose window

In 2009 the cathedral hosted the "Meeting internazionale delle comunità di San Colombano".

== Description ==
The groundplan is based on two asymmetrical naves separated by columns, a fairly common arrangement in the religious buildings of Lunigiana although less so in the churches of Liguria. Above the massive columns are thick semi-circular arcades.

There are differences between the two naves: the central and larger one is covered by barrel vaulting and ends in a semicircular apse with three single-light windows; the smaller side nave to the south however has bays of groin vaulting and terminates in a square wall inside within an external curved apse.

The interior, which is very sober, with few decorative elements retains traces and sculptured fragments from the ancient primitive church, as well as some frescoes among which, on the second column on the south, is one of the 14th century depicting Saint Columbanus giving a blessing; another, discovered during the works of 1994, is on the wall of the lesser nave and shows the Presentation in the Temple, in which may be recognised, not only Jesus, Joseph, Mary and the high priest, but also Saint Francis of Assisi and Saint Laurence.

A painting by Vincenzo Comaschi, dated 1821, depicts the Virgin Mary with the Infant Jesus on her lap among angels and Saints Francis and Laurence. Near the high altar is a polyptych showing Scenes from the life of Christ.

== Gallery ==
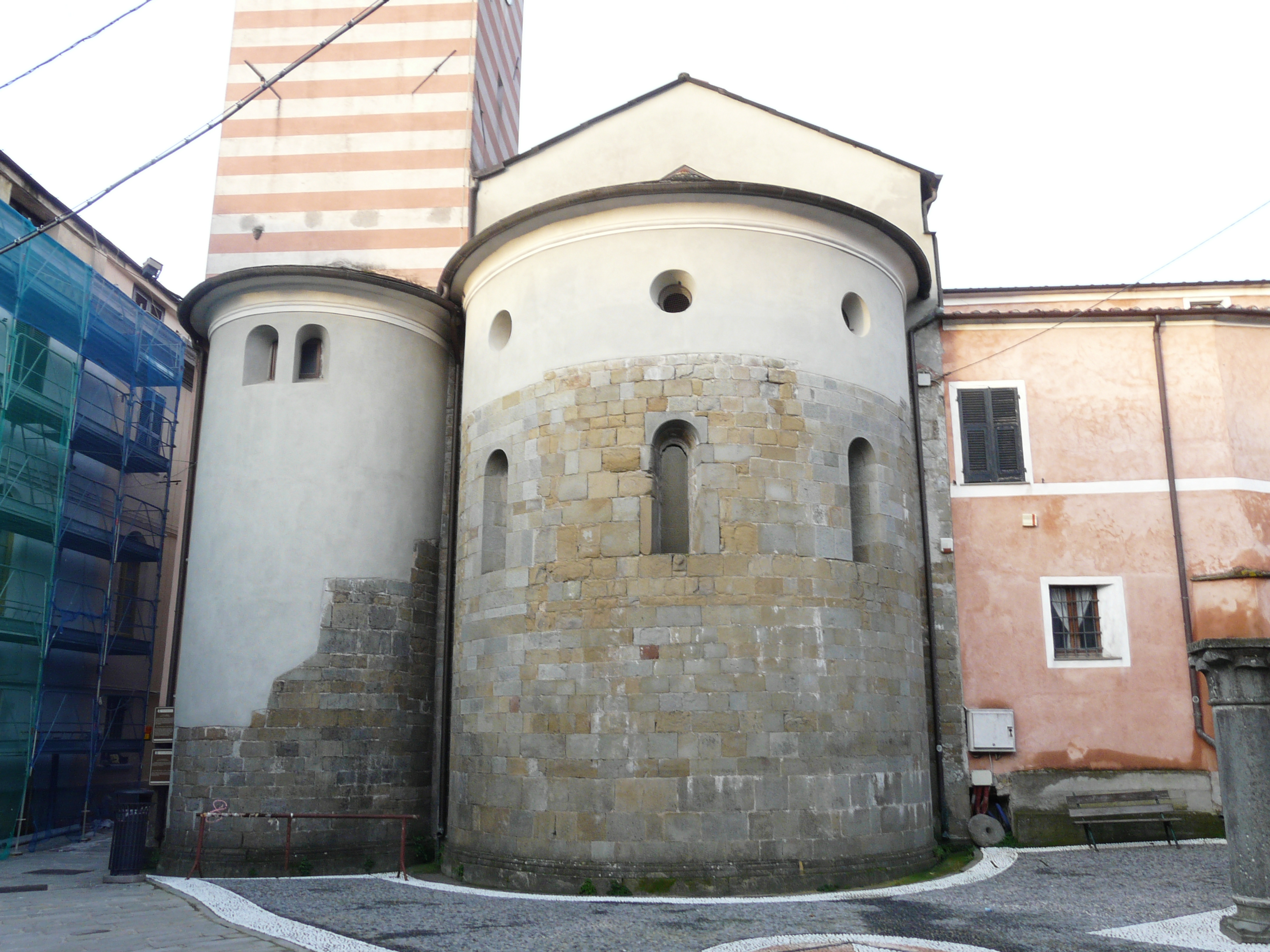
The apse with part of the bell tower

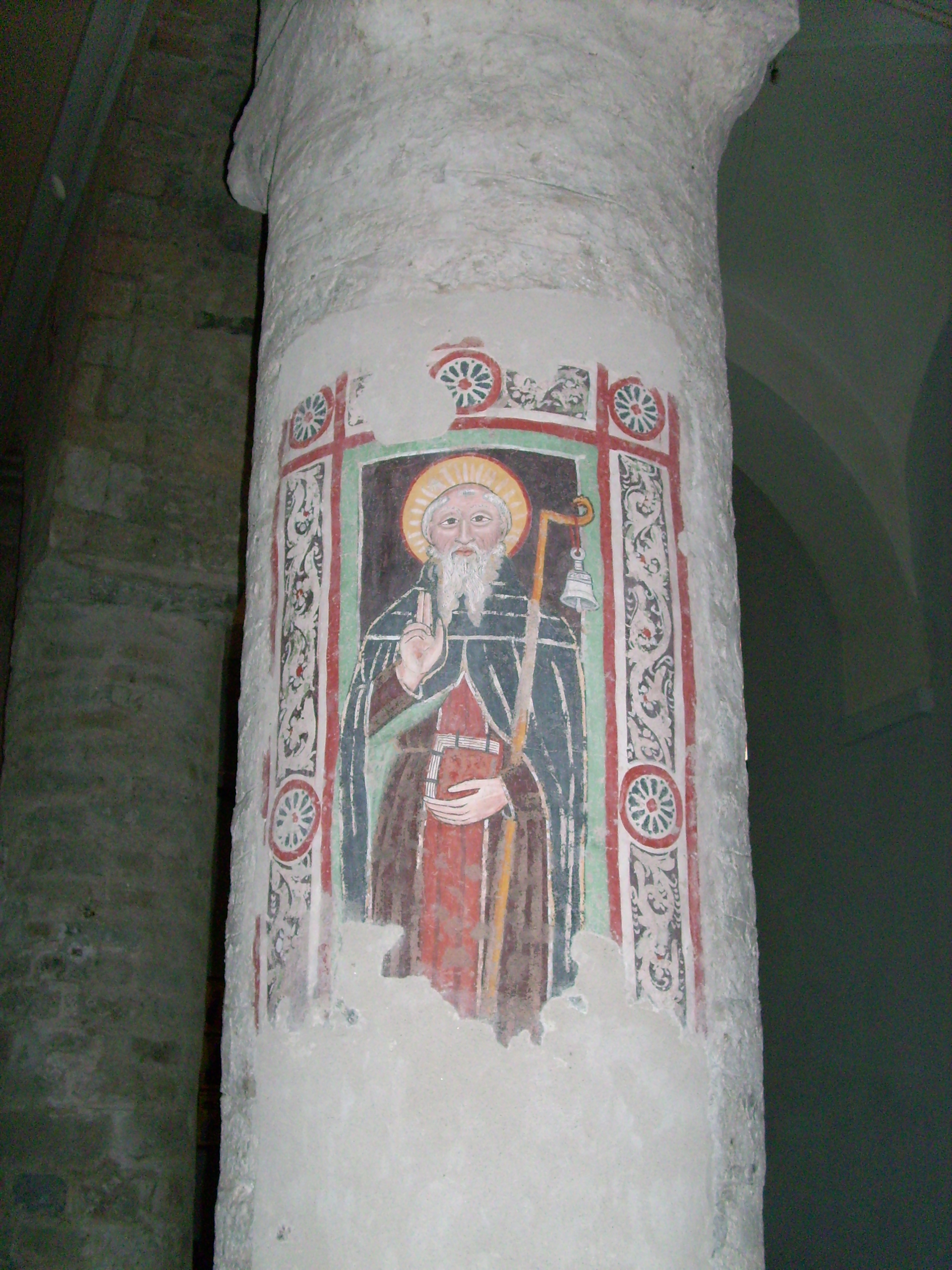
Fresco of Saint Colombanus giving a blessing

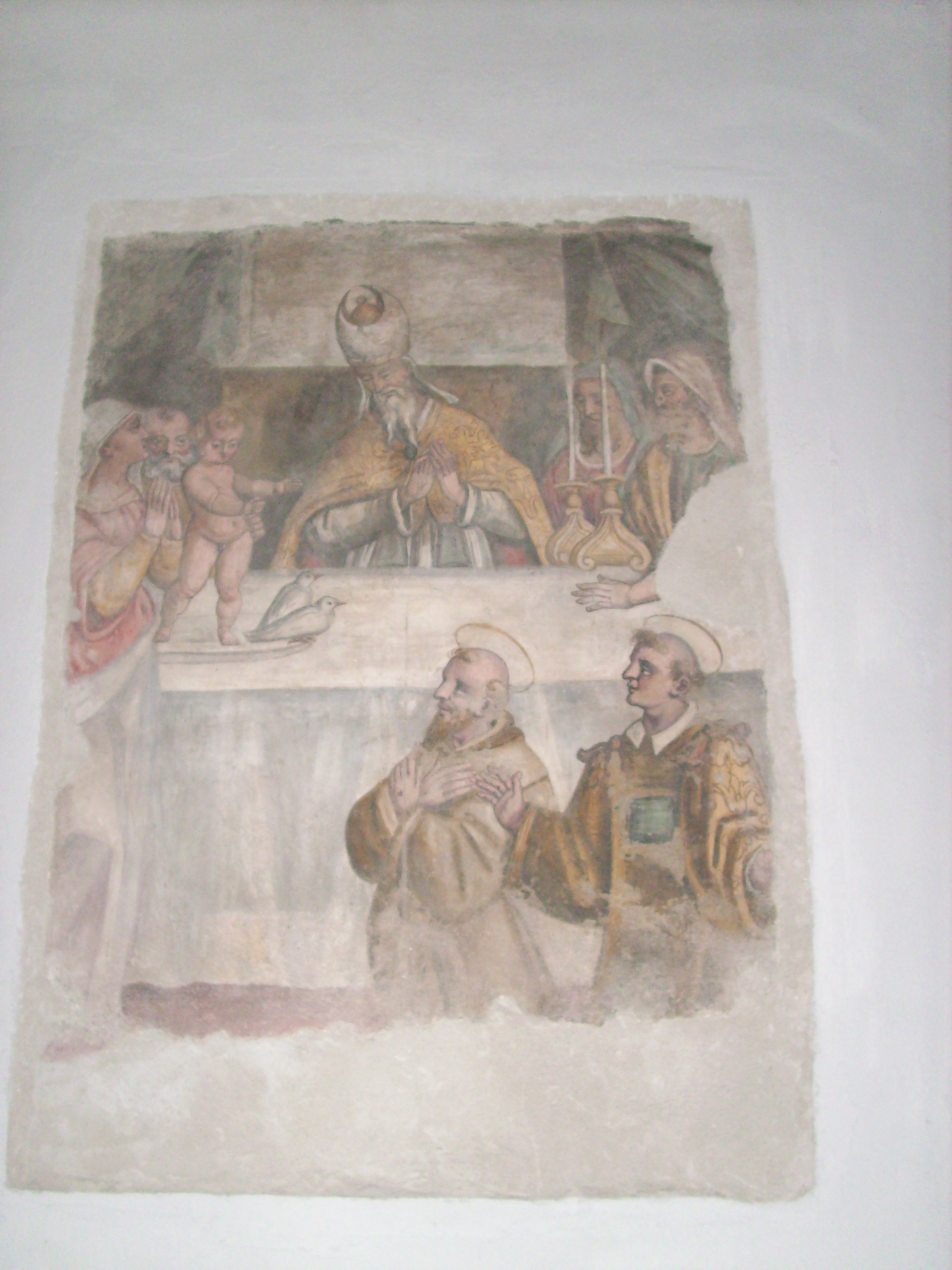
Fresco of The Presentation in the Temple

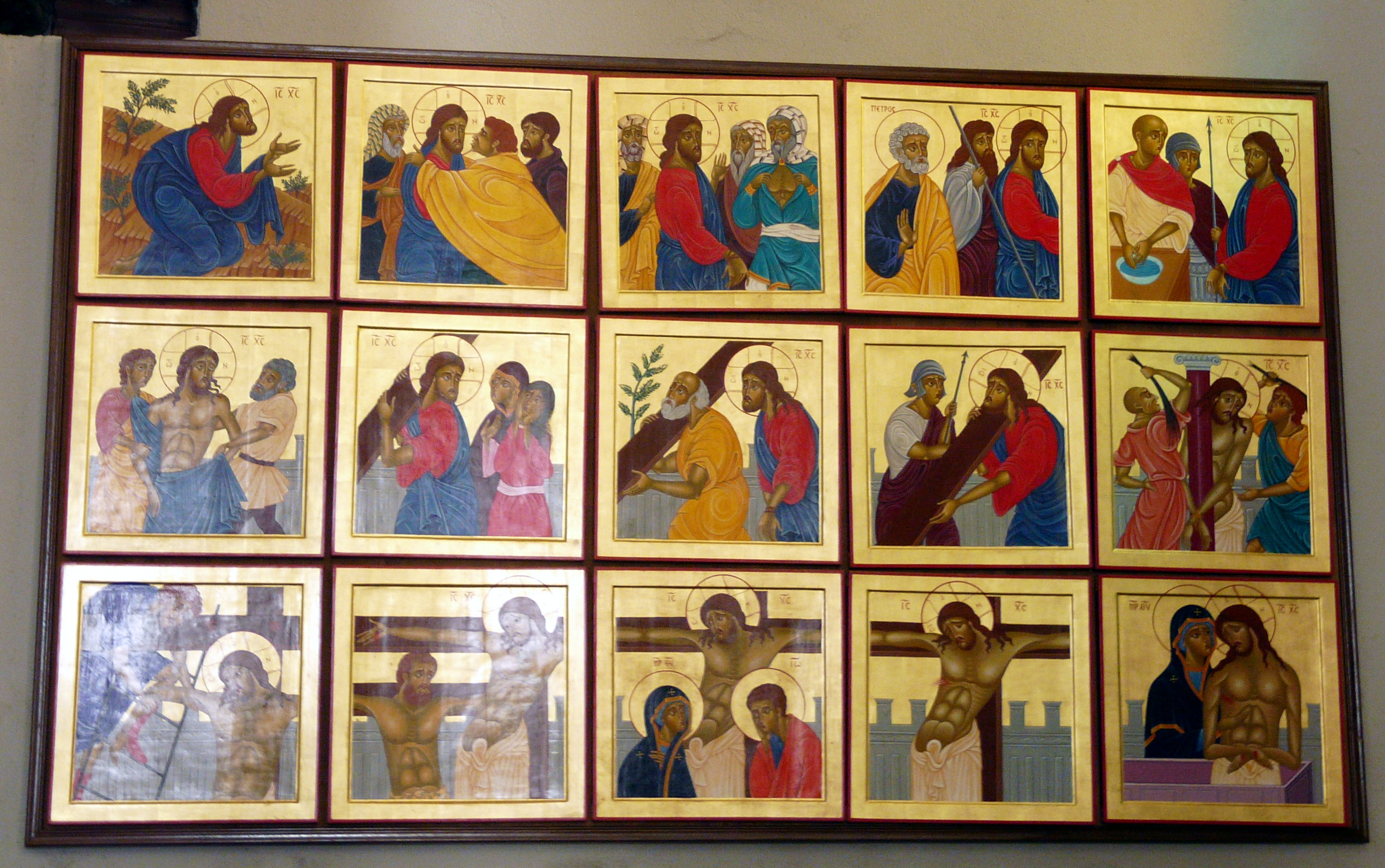
Polyptych of Scenes from the life of Christ

== Bibliography ==
- Maestri, A., 1939 et seq: Il culto di San Colombano in Italia. Archivio storico di Lodi
- Paglieri Pazzini, Nadia, & Paglieri, Rinangelo, 1990: Chiese in Liguria. Genova: Sagep Editrice ISBN 88-7058-361-9
- Ratti, Grazia, 1989: Arte e devozione in Val di Vara. Genova: Sagep Editrice
- Tomaini, P., 1963: La Cattedrale della Diocesi di Brugnato. Città di Castello
