= Gérard Cholley =

French rugby union player

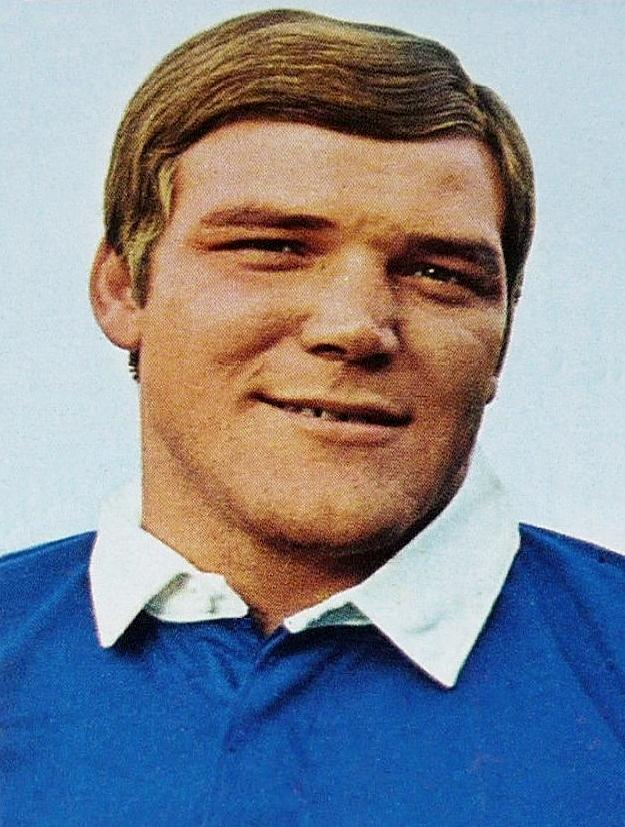
- Gérard Cholley in 1971
- Born: 6 June 1945 (age 81) Fontaine-les-Luxeuil, France
- Height: 1.93 m (6 ft 4 in)
- Weight: 114 kg (251 lb)

Rugby union career
- Position: Prop
Amateur team(s)
Years	Team	Apps	(Points)
- Castres Olympique
International career
Years	Team	Apps	(Points)
1975-1979	France	31	
1980	Barbarian RC	1	

Gérard Cholley (born 6 June 1945, in Fontaine-les-Luxeuil, France) is a retired French international rugby union player.

He played as a Prop for Castres Olympique. He earned his first cap with the French national team on 1 February 1975 against England at Twickenham.

== Honours ==
- Selected to represent France, 1975–1979
- Grand Slam : 1977
