= Bladulf =

Bladulf (Note: also Bladulph, Blidulf, Blidulph, Bladulphus, Baldulphus, or Blidulphus.) (died c. 630), was a monk and priest of Bobbio Abbey, killed on the orders of the Lombard king Arioald, because Bladulf would not salute him, as being an Arian. It is said that Abbot Attala restored Bladulf to life and delivered Arioald from a diabolical possession, the punishment of his crime; and that this two-fold miracle led to Arioald's conversion.

He is a Catholic and Orthodox saint, with his feast day on January 2.
