= Synod of Mâcon =

Church councils in the French city

There have been several synods of Mâcon, provincial church councils held in the city of Mâcon, then the seat of a diocese.

The second and third councils were both convoked by the Burgundian king Guntram. The third is associated with a legendary debate on women's souls.

== First council ==
The first synod was held in 579.

== Second council ==
The second council was held in 581 or 582. Unusually, one of the 19 canons it produced addressed a specific individual – a nun named Agnes. The 14th canon imposed a curfew against Jews, banning them from the streets at all times between Maundy Thursday and Easter Sunday. The 2nd canon prohibits Jews from talking to nuns. It has been suggested that this council may have drawn on the Sirmondian constitutions for some of its canons.

== Third council ==
The third council was held in 585. Among the main subjects the council considered was the issue of Tithing – for which the council formally legislated.

=== Legend of the debate on women's souls ===
Since the early modern period, there have apparently been claims that the council of 585 "denied that women have a soul". This tradition can be traced to one Johannes Leyser (1631–1685), a Lutheran pastor from Hesse, who published a work in favour of polygamy, Polygamia Triumphatrix in 1676 in which he wrote, in reference to the council of Macon, "Among the holy fathers there was one who insisted that women cannot, and should not, be called 'human beings' (viz. homines "men")." This information is apparently based on a story told by St. Gregory of Tours in his The History of the Franks. Gregory tells of a council (that may or may not, have been any of the synods at Mâcon) at which the meaning of the Latin word homo was discussed. This Latin word primarily means "human being" but also "adult male". Gregory writes the following in Latin, which is translated by Paul Halsall as:

There came forward at this Council a certain bishop who maintained that woman could not be included under the term 'man.' However, he accepted the reasoning of the other bishops and did not press his case, for the holy book of the Old Testament tells us that in the beginning, when God created man, 'Male and female he created them and called their name Adam,' which means earthly man; even so, he called the woman Eve, yet of both he used the word 'man.'

The claim that a Catholic council denied that "women are human" was taken up by Pierre Bayle in his pamphlets against Catholicism, and Bayle's work was used in anti-Catholic works, the rephrasing of the linguistic questions (does Latin homines include females?) in terms of a question of women having a "soul" is apparently due to one M. Aime-Martin.

== Fourth council ==
The fourth council (in 626 or 627) was convoked at the instigation of the monk Agrestius of Luxeuil over the schism of the Three Chapters. It approved the monastic rule of Saint Columbanus.

== Later councils ==
Other councils were held in Mâcon in 906 and 1286.
