= Fridolin of Säckingen =

6th–7th-century Irish missionary

Saint Fridolin of Säckingen
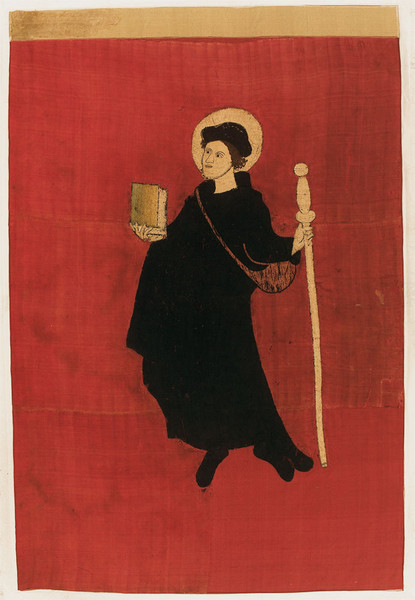
- Saint Fridolin depicted on the banner of Glarus, according to tradition the banner used in the Battle of Näfels (1388)

Apostle of the Upper Rhine
- Died: Säckingen, Germany
- Venerated in: Roman Catholic Church; Eastern Orthodox Church
- Canonized: Pre-Congregation
- Feast: 6 March
- Patronage: Alsace, France for good weather Glarus (city and canton), Switzerland; Säckingen, Germany; Strasbourg, France

Fridolin of Säckingen, also known as Fridold or Fredelinus, is a legendary Irish missionary, apostle of the Alamanni and founder of Säckingen Abbey on the Upper Rhine. He is also the patron saint of the Swiss canton of Glarus.

His oldest Vita is dated to the 10th or 11th century. Later tradition places the beginning of his mission during the reign of Clovis I (r. 509 – 511), and his death during the reign of Theudebert I (r. 533–548). The date of his death is traditionally given as 6 March in either 538 or 540. Modern historiography has tended to place the founder of Säckingen Abbey in the 7th rather than 6th century, tentatively assuming the existence of a historical Fridolin under Clovis II (r. 639–657) rather than Clovis I.

== Source ==
The earliest known reference to Fridolin is found in the records of a priest Hatto, towards the end of the 9th century. He made an inventory of the abandoned monastery from fear of the Normans. His list includes a Codex edged with silver and ivory, containing the Vitae of Saint Fridolin, Saint Hilarius, and Saint Arnulphus.

A surviving Vita of Fridolin was written by one Balther (Baltherus), a monk of Säckingen, apparently dated to the 10th century. Balther's life does not provide historical or chronological context, and includes a great number of miracles and visions. Balther claims to have derived his information from a biography which he discovered in the monastery of "Helera" on the Moselle, (Note: Identified with some certainty as Eller on the Moselle. The church of Eller district in the present town Ediger-Eller has always been dedicated to Saint Hilarius.) also founded by Fridolin. He had not had enough parchment or ink to copy the biography, Balther claims, and so he had instead learned it by heart.

The reliability of Balther's Vita of Fridolin is the topic of scholarly debate. Johann Peter Kirsch suggests that Balther relied on an earlier verbal tradition for the information recorded in his work. On the other hand, historian Gerold Meyer von Konau dismisses Balther this as entirely untrustworthy, and considers the Vita a forgery of the mid-11th century.

Consequently, very little can be said about the historical individual. Fridolin appears to have been an Irish missionary among the Alamanni along the Upper Rhine, who at the time were under Merovingian rule, and he went on to found Säckingen Abbey.

== Legend ==
According to the Vita, Fridolin belonged to a noble family in Ireland, and at first was a missionary there. Afterwards crossing to France, he came to Poitiers, where in answer to a vision, he sought out the relics of Saint Hilarius, and built a church for them. Saint Hilarius subsequently appeared to him in a dream, and commanded him to proceed to an island in the Rhine, in the territories of the Alamanni. In obedience to this summons, Fridolin approached Clovis I, who granted him possession of the still unknown island, and thence proceeded through "Helion", (Note: Unidentified but possibly the same as Helera mentioned above.) Strasbourg and Coire, founding churches in every district in honour of Saint Hilarius.

At last reaching the island of Säckingen in the Rhine, Fridolin recognized in it the island indicated in the dream, and prepared to build a church there. The inhabitants of the banks of the Rhine, however, who used the island as pasture for their cattle, mistook Fridolin for a cattle-robber and expelled him. On his production of Clovis's deed of gift, he was allowed to return, and to found a church and monastery on the island. He then resumed his missionary labours. He founded the "Scottish monastery" ("Schottenstift") in Konstanz, and extended his mission to Augsburg. He died on 6 March, and was buried at Säckingen.

Fridolin's connection to Glarus is based on a later legend, a 13th-century addition to Balther's Vita under the title de miraculis s. Fridolini. In this legend, he converted a landowner named Ursus (or Urso). On his death Ursus left his lands in the Linth valley (the later canton of Glarus), to Fridolin, who founded numerous churches dedicated to Saint Hilarius. Ursus's brother Landolf refused to accept the legitimacy of the gift and brought Fridolin before a court at Rankweil to prove his title. Fridolin did so by summoning Ursus from the dead to confirm the gift in person, so terrifying Landolf that he gave his lands to Fridolin as well.

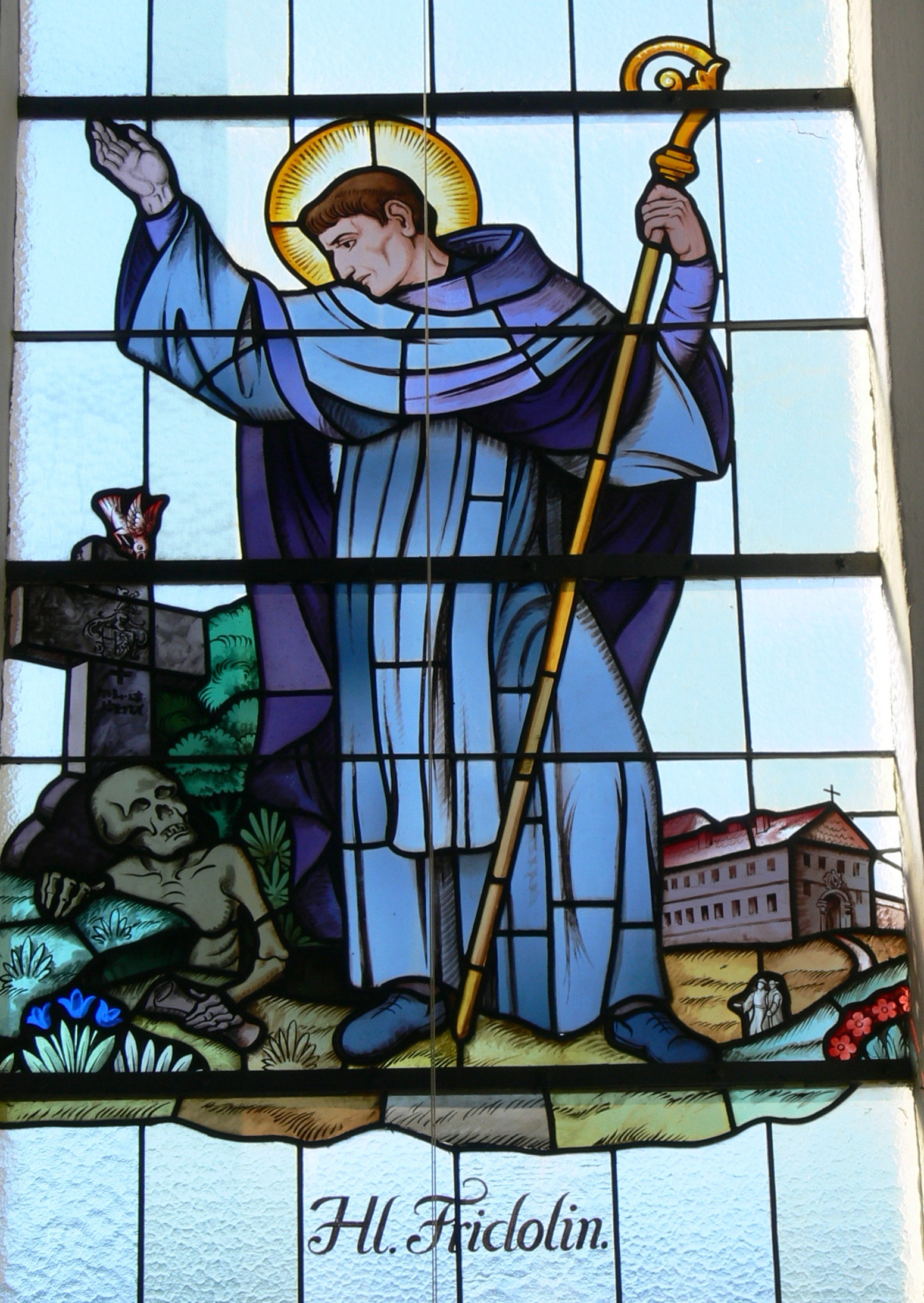
Fridolin, Andelsbuch Pfarrkirche

== Veneration ==
The existence of monasteries dedicated to Hilarius of Poitiers in Ediger-Eller, Dillersmünster, Strasbourg and Chur as well as Säckingen points to a trend of veneration of Hilarius in the 7th century, when the Alamanni were effectively Christianised. Fridolin would have been a representative of this movement. Fridolin's own relics are venerated in Säckingen. His cult is attested from the late 9th century, although his name is missing from the list of saints by Notker Balbulus (d. 912). Petrus Damiani (c. 1060) refers to the saint as Fredelinus.

=== Iconography ===
Fridolin's iconography is strongly influenced by the later Ursus legend, recorded in the 13th century, his attribute being the skeleton of Ursus. The veneration of Fridolin in Glarus can be traced to the valley having been owned by Säckingen Abbey, presumably since the 9th century.

== See also ==
- Saint Fridolin of Säckingen, patron saint archive
