= Säckingen Abbey =

Former Roman Catholic abbey

- Location within Baden-Württemberg Location within Germany
- Interactive map of Säckingen Abbey

Monastery information
- Established: 6th or 7th century
- Disestablished: 12 June 1806

People
- Founder: Fridolin of Säckingen

Architecture
- Status: Caritas Community Center

Site
- Location: Bad Säckingen, Baden-Württemberg, Germany
- Coordinates: 47°33′11″N 7°57′01″E
- Public access: yes
- Website: www.caritas-hochrhein.de/badsaeck.htm

Säckingen Abbey is a former Roman Catholic abbey located in Bad Säckingen, Baden-Württemberg in Germany. The Abbey was founded in the 6th or 7th century by Fridolin of Säckingen, an Irish monk. While the Abbey had both monks and nuns, only the nuns' convent grew to be an important religious, economic and cultural institution for the entire upper Rhine.

== Foundation of the Abbey ==
According to the story of Saint Fridolin, St. Hilarius appeared to him in a dream, and commanded him to proceed to an island in the Rhine, in the territories of the Alamanni. In obedience to this summon, Fridolin repaired to the "Emperor" Clovis, who granted him possession of the still unknown island, and thence proceeded through Helion, Strasburg, and Coire, founding churches in every district in honour of St. Hilarius. Reaching at last the island of Säckingen in the Rhine, he recognized in it the island indicated in the dream, and prepared to build a church there. The inhabitants of the banks of the Rhine, however, who used the island as a pasturage for their cattle, mistook Fridolin for a cattle-robber and expelled him. On his production of Clovis's deed of gift, he was allowed to return, and to found a church and monastery on the island. He then resumed his missionary labours, founded the Scottish monastery in Constance, and extended his mission to Augsburg. He died on 6 March, and was buried at Säckingen.

The only portion of the life that can be regarded as historically tenable, is that Fridolin was an Irish missionary, who preached the Christian religion in Gaul, and founded a monastery on the island of Säckingen in the Rhine; the exact dates of this are unknown.

== History ==
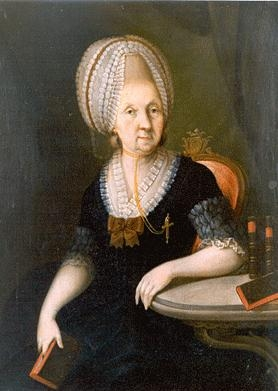
Maria Anna Franziska von Hornstein-Göffingen, last Princess-Abbess of Säckingen

Little is known about the early history of the Abbey before the 9th century. On 10 February 878, the Emperor Charles the Fat gave his wife Richardis the monasteries of Säckingen, of St. Felix and of Regula in Zurich as a royal estate. This grant included extensive political rights and a large estate, which covered land in the Rhine and Frick valleys, the southern Hotzenwald, and lands in Zurich along Lake Walen and the valley of Glarus.

In 1173 Emperor Frederick Barbarossa granted rights to the Imperial bailiwick of Säckingen Abbey to Count Albert III of Habsburg. This was the foundation for the development of Habsburg territorial sovereignty over Säckingen. In 1307 the abbess of Säckingen was elevated to the rank of Reichsfürst or Imperial Prince. In 1395, the Glarus valley broke away from the Abbey and became independent, yet retained the image of St. Fridolin as the coat of arms of their canton.

Between 1565 and 1575 the Abbey buildings were renovated and expanded. Then, in 1806 the Abbey was closed. On 12 June 1806, representatives of twelve German princes met with Napoleon to form the Confederation of the Rhine. As part of the agreement, the Abbey was closed and all the Abbey's property was transferred to the Grand Duke of Baden in 1806 together with the city of Säckingen.

As of 2024 the buildings are used by the Caritas Catholic charity as a community center.
