= Sirmondian constitutions =

Collection of sixteen Imperial Codes

The Sirmondian Constitutions are a collection of sixteen Imperial Codes passed between AD 333 and 425, dealing with "bishops courts", or laws dealing with church matters. They take their name from their first editor, Jacques Sirmond. Some of the laws appeared in abbreviated form in the Theodosian Code. The full collection survives only in a single early medieval manuscript now in Berlin, termed the Codex Lugdunensis.

The Constitution's authenticity is disputed. Some historians, such as Elisabeth Magnou-Nortier, think they are church forgeries; others, such as Olivier Huck, find them genuine. Recent work has tended to suggest that they are essentially genuine but may have been edited, perhaps as part of preparations for the Second Council of Mâcon in 582.

== Editions ==
The standard edition is Theodosiani libri XVI cum Constitutionibus Sirmondianis et Leges Novellae ad Theodosianum pertinentes, edited by T. Mommsen and P. M. Meyer, in 2 volumes in Berlin in1905.

The English language version is The Theodosian Code and Novels and the Sirmondian Constitutions. A Translation with Commentary, Glossary, and Bibliography, translated and edited by C. Pharr and published in New York, in 1952.
