= Jonas of Bobbio =

Columbanian monk

Abbot, Hagiographer, disciple of Columbanus
- Residence: Bobbio Abbey
- Honored in: Catholic Church
- Feast: 28 May; 28 June
- Major works: Lives of Saints

Jonas of Bobbio (also known as Jonas of Susa) (Sigusia, now Susa, Italy, c. 600 – after 659 AD) was a Columbanian monk and a major Latin monastic author of hagiography. His Life of Saint Columbanus is "one of the most influential works of early medieval hagiography."

== Biography ==
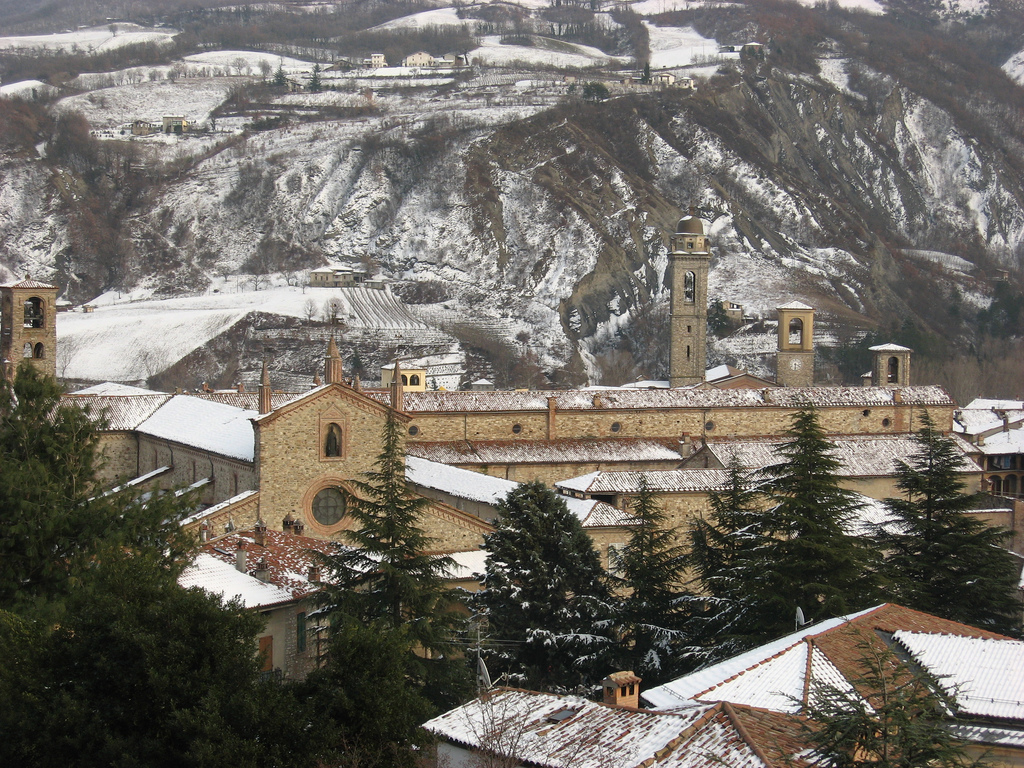
Abbazia di San Colombano, Bobbio

Jonas was born in Susa, Piedmont. In 618, Jonas arrived at the Abbey of St. Columbanus at Bobbio in the province of Pavia. He was soon appointed archivist and personal secretary to the abbot Attala (died 627) and later, to his successor Bertulf. In 628, the Bishop of Tortona attempted to bring Bobbio under his own jurisdiction. Jonas accompanied Bertulf on a journey to Rome to persuade Pope Honorius I to exempt Bobbio from episcopal jurisdiction, and make the abbey immediately subject to the Holy See. Jonas relates that, while returning to the monastery, Bertulf suffered a deadly fever, but was miraculously cured by St. Peter.

Immediately after his return, Jonas moved to Gaul, and his biography of Eustace of Luxeuil, reflects personal acquaintance. Saint Amand asked Jonas for assistance in his missionary work among the pagans of what is now Belgium and northern France, which occasioned his vita of Saint Vedast, the first Frankish Bishop of Arras. In fulfillment of a promise made to the monks of Bobbio during a short return visit to the monastery in 639, he wrote between 640 and 643 his principal work, the Life of St. Columbanus. Jonas asserted that he had based his account on the testimony of persons who had known him personally, such as the saint's companions. As almost all accounts of the Irish missionaries in Gaul have been lost, the biography of Columban is of great value.

In 659, Jonas was sent by the Queen-Regent Balthild as abbot to a monastery in Chalon-sur-Saône. He has sometimes been identified with Jonatus, recorded as abbot of Marchiennes around the same time, although no medieval source identifies the two or equates their names. During this journey he sojourned for a few days at the monastery of Réôme (Reomans, now Moutiers-Saint-Jean) in the diocese of Langres. To comply with a request made by the monks on this occasion he wrote the life of their founder, Jean de Réôme.

== Works ==
The other works of Jonas are lives of the abbots Attala and Bertulf of Bobbio and of the abbess Burgundofara of Evoriac (modern Faremoutiers). Bede incorporated the lives of Eustace, Attala, and Bertulf into his Ecclesiastical History, while Flodoard turned that of Columbanus into hexameter verse. The "Life of St. Fara" is chiefly an account of miraculous events alleged to have occurred during this saint's rule at Evoriac, but Jonas' elaborate and fantastically miraculous account contains nuggets of historical information that throw light upon a poorly documented time.

The works of Jonas, exclusive of the "Life of St. Vaast", are printed in Patrologia Latina LXXXVII, 1011–88.

== Veneration ==
Jonas is venerated in Catholic Church:

- 28 May – commemoration, (Bollandists),
- 28 June – commemoration, Menologium Scotorum by Thomas Dempster,
