= Columbanus =

Irish missionary (543–615)

Saint Columbanus
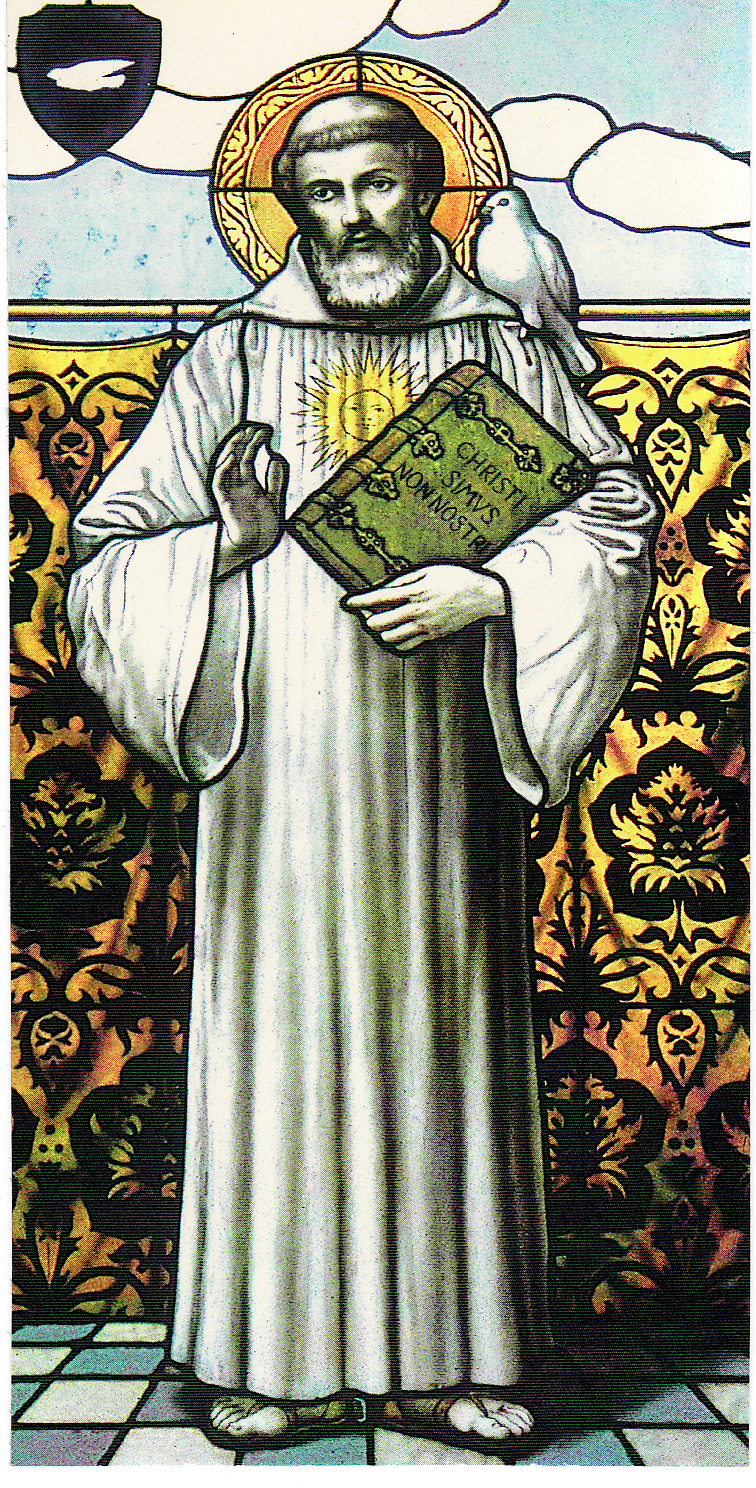
- Saint Columbanus, stained glass window, Bobbio Abbey crypt
- Born: 543; Kingdom of Leinster
- Died: 21 November 615 (aged 71–72); Bobium, Kingdom of the Lombards
- Venerated in: Eastern Orthodox Church; Roman Catholic Church
- Feast: 23 November

Columbanus (Irish: Columbán; 543 – 21 November 615) was an Irish missionary notable for founding a number of monasteries after 590 in the Frankish and Lombard kingdoms, most notably Luxeuil Abbey in present-day France and Bobbio Abbey in present-day Italy. Columbanus taught an Irish monastic rule and penitential practices for those repenting of sins, which emphasised private confession to a priest, followed by penances imposed by the priest in reparation for the sins. Columbanus is one of the earliest identifiable Hiberno-Latin writers.

== Sources ==
Most of what we know about Columbanus is based on Columbanus's own works (as far as they have been preserved) and Jonas of Susa's Vita Columbani (Life of Columbanus), which was written between 639 and 641. (Note: Walker's edition is also available on CELT (University College Cork), a website that provides Irish medieval sources with English translations. A critical edition of Jonas's Vita Columbani was published in 1905 by Bruno Krusch in Monumenta Germaniae Historica, Scriptores Rerum Germaincarum in usum schoarum, vol. 37, Hannover: Hahn 1905. See also Internet Medieval Sourcebook.)

Jonas entered Bobbio after Columbanus's death but relied on reports of monks who knew Columbanus. A description of miracles of Columbanus written by an anonymous monk of Bobbio is of much later date. In the second volume of his Acta Sanctorum O.S.B., Jean Mabillon gives the life in full, together with an appendix on the miracles of Columbanus, written by an anonymous member of the Bobbio community.

== Biography and early life ==
Columbanus (the Latinised form of Colmán, meaning little dove) was born in the Kingdom of Leinster, Ireland in 543. After his conception, his mother was said to have had a vision of her child's "remarkable genius".

He was first educated under Abbot Sinell of Cluaninis, whose monastery was on an island of the River Erne, in modern County Fermanagh. Under Sinell's instruction, Columbanus composed a commentary on the Psalms.

Columbanus then moved to Bangor Abbey where he studied to become a teacher of the Bible. He was well-educated in the areas of grammar, rhetoric, geometry, and the Holy Scriptures. Abbot Comgall taught him Greek and Latin. He stayed at Bangor until c. 590, when Comgall reluctantly gave him permission to travel to the continent.

=== Frankish Gaul (c. 590 – 610) ===
Columbanus in Frankish Gaul

Columbanus set sail with twelve companions: Attala, Columbanus the Younger, Gallus, Domgal, Cummain, Eogain, Eunan, Gurgano, Libran, Lua, Sigisbert and Waldoleno. They crossed the channel via Cornwall and landed in Saint-Malo, Brittany.

Columbanus then entered the Frankish kingdom of Burgundy. Jonas writes that:

At that time, either because of the numerous enemies from without, or on account of the carelessness of the bishops, the Christian faith had almost departed from that country. The creed alone remained. But the saving grace of penance and the longing to root out the lusts of the flesh were to be found only in a few. Everywhere that he went the noble man [Columbanus] preached the Gospel. And it pleased the people because his teaching was adorned by eloquence and enforced by examples of virtue.

Columbanus and his companions were welcomed by King Guntram of Burgundy, who granted them land at Anegray, where they converted a ruined Roman fortress into a school. Despite its remote location in the Vosges Mountains, the school rapidly attracted so many students that they moved to a new site at Luxeuil and then established a second school at Fontaines. These schools remained under Columbanus's authority, and their rules of life reflected the Celtic tradition in which he had been educated.

As these communities expanded and drew more pilgrims, Columbanus sought greater solitude. Often he would withdraw to a cave seven miles away, with a single companion who acted as messenger between himself and his companions.

==== Conflict with Frankish Bishops ====
Tensions arose in 603 AD when St. Columbanus and his followers argued with Frankish bishops over the exact date of Easter. (St. Columbanus celebrated Easter according to Celtic rites and the Celtic Christian calendar.)

The Frankish bishops may have feared his growing influence. During the first half of the sixth century, the councils of Gaul had given to bishops absolute authority over religious communities. Celtic Christians, Columbanus and his monks used the Irish Easter calculation, a version of Bishop Augustalis's 84-year computus for determining the date of Easter (quartodecimanism), whereas the Franks had adopted the Victorian cycle of 532 years. The bishops objected to the newcomers' continued observance of their own dating, which – among other issues – caused the end of Lent to differ. They also complained about the distinct Irish tonsure.

In 602, the bishops assembled to judge Columbanus, but he did not appear before them as requested. Instead, he sent a letter to the prelates – a strange mixture of freedom, reverence, and charity – admonishing them to hold synods more frequently, and advising them to pay more attention to matters of equal importance to that of the date of Easter. In defence of his following his traditional paschal cycle, he wrote:

I am not the author of this divergence. I came as a poor stranger into these parts for the cause of Christ, Our Saviour. One thing alone I ask of you, holy Fathers, permit me to live in silence in these forests, near the bones of seventeen of my brethren now dead.

When the bishops refused to abandon the matter, Columbanus appealed directly to Pope Gregory I. In the third and only surviving letter, he asks "the holy Pope, his Father" to provide "the strong support of his authority" and to render a "verdict of his favour", apologising for "presuming to argue as it were, with him who sits in the chair of Peter, Apostle and Bearer of the Keys". None of the letters were answered, most likely due to the pope's death in 604.

Columbanus then sent a letter to Gregory's successor, Pope Boniface IV, asking him to confirm the tradition of his elders – if it was not contrary to the Faith – so that he and his monks could follow the rites of their ancestors. Before Boniface responded, Columbanus moved outside the jurisdiction of the Frankish bishops. As the Easter issue appears to end around that time, Columbanus may have stopped celebrating the Irish date of Easter after moving to Italy.

==== Conflict with Brunhilda of Austrasia ====
Columbanus was also involved in a dispute with members of the Merovingian dynasty. Upon the death of King Guntram of Burgundy, the succession passed to his nephew, Childebert II, the son of his brother Sigebert and Sigebert's wife Brunhilda of Austrasia. When Childebert II died, his territories were divided between his two sons: Theuderic II inherited the Kingdom of Burgundy and Theudebert II inherited the Kingdom of Austrasia. Both were minors and Brunhilda, their grandmother, ruled as their regent.

Theuderic II "very often visited" Columbanus, but when Columbanus rebuked him for having a concubine, Brunhilda became his bitterest foe because she feared the loss of her influence if Theuderic II married. Brunhilda incited the court and Catholic bishops against Columbanus and Theuderic II confronted Columbanus at Luxeuil, accusing him of violating the "common customs" and "not allowing all Christians" in the monastery. Columbanus asserted his independence to run the monastery without interference and was imprisoned at Besançon for execution.

Columbanus escaped and returned to Luxeuil. When the king and his grandmother found out, they sent soldiers to drive him back to Ireland by force, separating him from his monks by insisting that only those from Ireland could accompany him into exile.

Columbanus was taken to Nevers, then travelled by boat down the Loire river to the coast. At Tours he visited the tomb of Martin of Tours, and sent a message to Theuderic II indicating that within three years he and his children would perish. When he arrived at Nantes, he wrote a letter before embarkation to his fellow monks at Luxeuil monastery. The letter urged his brethren to obey Attala, who stayed behind as abbot of the monastic community.

The letter concludes:

They come to tell me the ship is ready. The end of my parchment compels me to finish my letter. Love is not orderly; it is this which has made it confused. Farewell, dear hearts of mine; pray for me that I may live in God.

Soon after the ship set sail from Nantes, a severe storm drove the vessel back ashore. Convinced that his holy passenger caused the tempest, the captain refused further attempts to transport the monk. Columbanus found sanctuary with Chlothar II of Neustria at Soissons, who gave him an escort to the court of King Theudebert II of Austrasia.

=== The Alps (611–612) ===
Columbanus arrived at Theudebert II's court in Metz in 611, where members of the Luxeuil school met him and Theudebert II granted them land at Bregenz. They travelled up the Rhine via Mainz to the lands of the Suebi and Alemanni in the northern Alps, intending to preach the Gospel to these people. He followed the Rhine river and its tributaries, the Aar and the Limmat, and then on to Lake Zurich. Columbanus chose the village of Tuggen as his initial community, but the work was not successful. He continued north-east by way of Arbon to Bregenz on Lake Constance. Here he found an oratory dedicated to Aurelia of Strasbourg containing three brass images of their tutelary deities. Columbanus commanded Gallus, who knew the local language, to preach to the inhabitants, and many were converted. The three brass images were destroyed, and Columbanus blessed the little church, placing the relics of Aurelia beneath the altar. A monastery was erected, Mehrerau Abbey, and the brethren observed their regular life. Columbanus stayed in Bregenz for about one year.

In the spring of 612, war broke out between Austrasia and Burgundy and Theudebert II was resoundingly beaten by Theuderic II. As Theuderich took over Austrasia, Columbanus was again vulnerable to Theuderic II's opprobrium. When Columbanus's students began to be murdered in the woods, Columbanus decided to cross the Alps into Lombardy.

Gallus remained in this area until his death in 646. About seventy years later at the place of Gallus's cell the Abbey of Saint Gall was founded. The city of St. Gallen originated as an adjoining settlement of the abbey.

=== Lombardy (612–615) ===
Columbanus in the Alps and Italy

Columbanus arrived in Milan in 612 and was welcomed by King Agilulf and Queen Theodelinda of the Lombards. He immediately began refuting the teachings of Arianism, which had enjoyed a degree of acceptance in Italy. He wrote a treatise against Arianism, which has since been lost. In 614, Agilulf granted Columbanus land for a school at the site of a ruined church at Bobbio.

At the king's request, Columbanus wrote a letter to Pope Boniface IV on the controversy over the Three Chapters – writings by Syrian bishops suspected of Nestorianism, which had been condemned in the fifth century as heresy. Pope Gregory I had tolerated in Lombardy those persons who defended the Three Letters, among them King Agilulf. Columbanus agreed to take up the issue on behalf of the king. The letter has a diplomatic tone and begins with an apology that a "foolish Scot" (Scottus, Irishman) would be writing for a Lombard king. After acquainting the pope with the imputations brought against him, he entreats the pontiff to prove his orthodoxy and assemble a council. When critiquing Boniface, he writes that his freedom of speech is consistent with the custom of his country. Some of the language used in the letter might now be regarded as disrespectful, but in that time, faith and austerity could be more indulgent. Columbanus was tactful when making critiques, as he begins the letter he expresses with the most affectionate and impassioned devotion to the Holy See.

We Irish, though dwelling at the far ends of the earth, are all disciples of Saint Peter and Saint Paul ... we are bound to the Chair of Peter, and although Rome is great and renowned, through that Chair alone is she looked on as great and illustrious among us ... On account of the two Apostles of Christ, you are almost celestial, and Rome is the head of the whole world, and of the Churches.

Later, he reveals charges against the Papacy so as to encourage Boniface to make concessions:

For, as I hear, you are alleged to favour heretics—God forbid men should believe that this has been, is, or shall be true. For they say that Eutyches, Nestorius, and Dioscorus, old heretics as we know, were favoured at some Council, at the fifth, by Vigilius. Here, as they say, is the cause of the whole calumny; if, as is reported, you also favour thus, or if you know that even (Pope) Vigilius himself died under such a taint, why do you repeat his name against your conscience? Already it is your fault if you have erred from the true belief and made your first faith void; justly do your subordinates oppose you, and justly do they hold no communion with you.

Columbanus's deference towards Rome is sufficiently clear, calling the pope "his Lord and Father in Christ", the "Chosen Watchman", and the "First Pastor, set higher than all mortals", also asserting that "we Irish, inhabitants of the world’s edge, are disciples of Saints Peter and Paul and of all the disciples" and that "the unity of faith has produced in the whole world a unity of power and privilege."

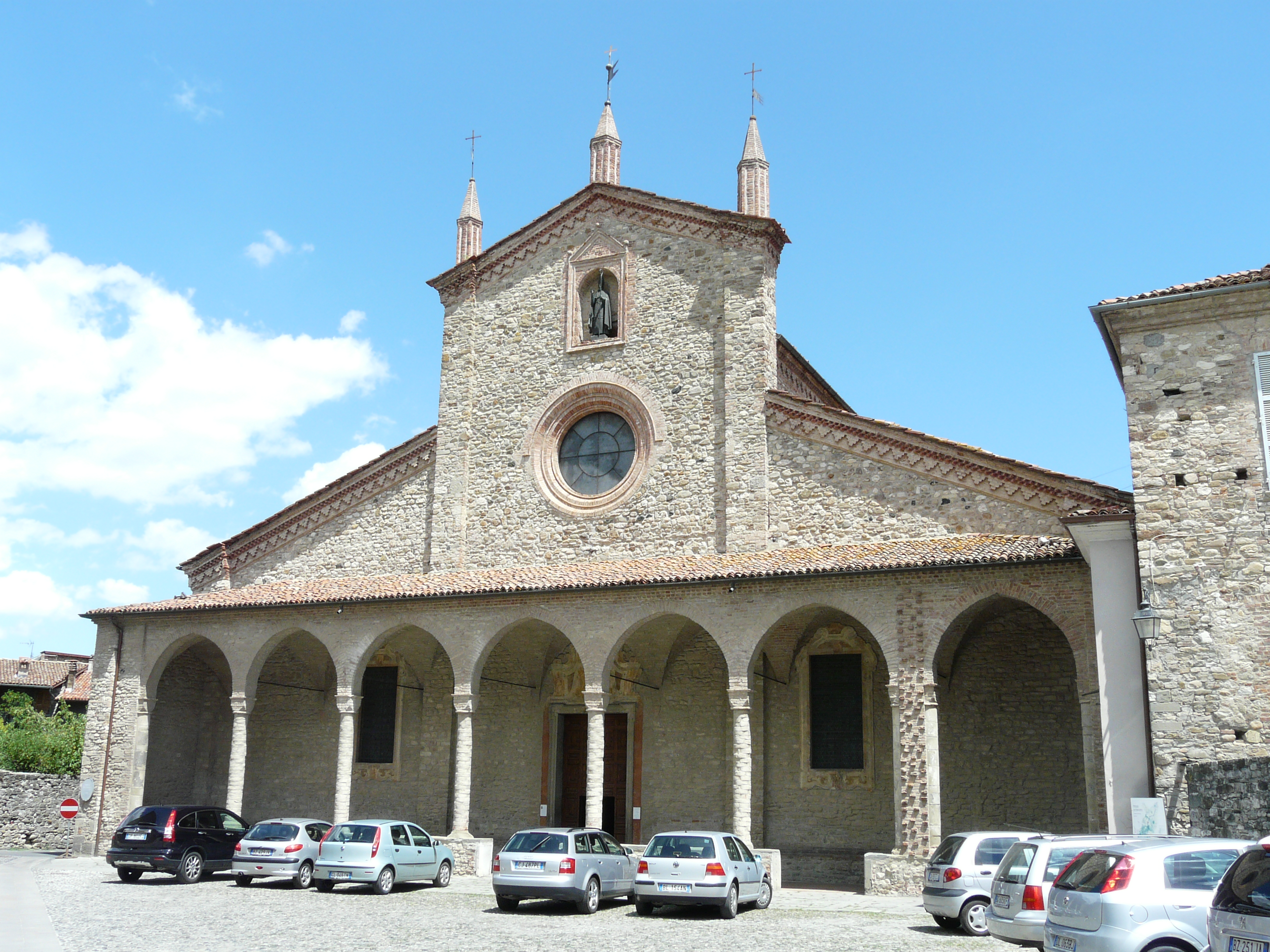
Facade of the Abbey in Bobbio

King Agilulf gave Columbanus a tract of land called Bobbio between Milan and Genoa near the Trebbia river, situated in a defile of the Apennine Mountains, to be used as a base for the conversion of the Lombard people. The area contained a ruined church and wastelands known as Ebovium, which had formed part of the lands of the papacy prior to the Lombard invasion. Columbanus wanted this secluded place, for while enthusiastic in the instruction of the Lombards he preferred solitude for his monks and himself. Next to the little church, which was dedicated to Peter the Apostle, Columbanus erected a monastery in 614. Bobbio Abbey at its foundation followed the Rule of Saint Columbanus, based on the monastic practices of Celtic Christianity. For centuries it remained the stronghold of orthodoxy in northern Italy. (Note: Bobbio Abbey may have been the model for the monastery in northern Italy in Umberto Eco's novel The Name of the Rose.)

=== Death ===
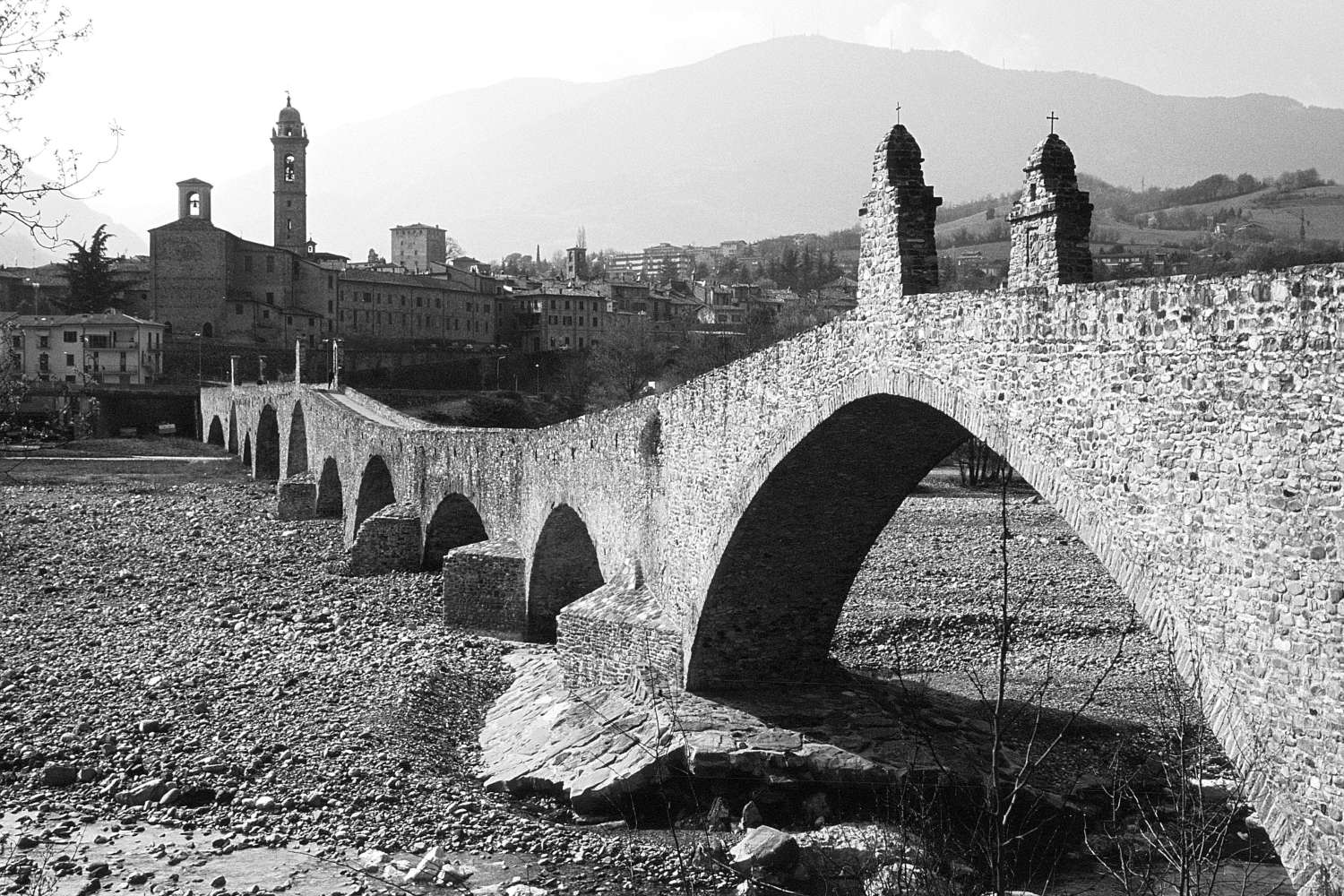
Stone bridge over the Trebbia river leading to Bobbio Abbey in northern Italy

During the last year of his life, Columbanus received messages from King Chlothar II, inviting him to return to Burgundy, now that his enemies were dead. Columbanus did not return, but requested that the king should always protect his monks at Luxeuil Abbey. He prepared for death by retiring to his cave on the mountainside overlooking the Trebbia river, where, according to a tradition, he had dedicated an oratory to Our Lady. Columbanus died at Bobbio on 21 November 615 and is buried there.

== Rule of Saint Columbanus ==
The Rule of Saint Columbanus embodied the customs of Bangor Abbey and other Irish monasteries. Much shorter than the Rule of Saint Benedict, the Rule of Saint Columbanus consists of ten chapters, on the subjects of obedience, silence, food, poverty, humility, chastity, choir offices, discretion, mortification, and perfection.

In the first chapter, Columbanus introduces the great principle of his Rule: obedience, absolute and unreserved. The words of seniors should always be obeyed, just as "Christ obeyed the Father up to death for us". One manifestation of this obedience was constant hard labour designed to subdue the flesh, exercise the will in daily self-denial, and set an example of industry in cultivation of the soil. The least deviation from the Rule entailed corporal punishment, or a severe form of fasting. In the second chapter, Columbanus instructs that the rule of silence be "carefully observed", since it is written: "But the nurture of righteousness is silence and peace". He also warns, "Justly will they be damned who would not say just things when they could, but preferred to say with garrulous loquacity what is evil". In the third chapter, Columbanus instructs, "Let the monks' food be poor and taken in the evening, such as to avoid repletion, and their drink such as to avoid intoxication, so that it may both maintain life and not harm". Columbanus continues:

For indeed those who desire eternal rewards must only consider usefulness and use. Use of life must be moderated just as toil must be moderated, since this is true discretion, that the possibility of spiritual progress may be kept with a temperance that punishes the flesh. For if temperance exceeds measure, it will be a vice and not a virtue; for virtue maintains and retains many goods. Therefore we must fast daily, just as we must feed daily; and while we must eat daily, we must gratify the body more poorly and sparingly ...

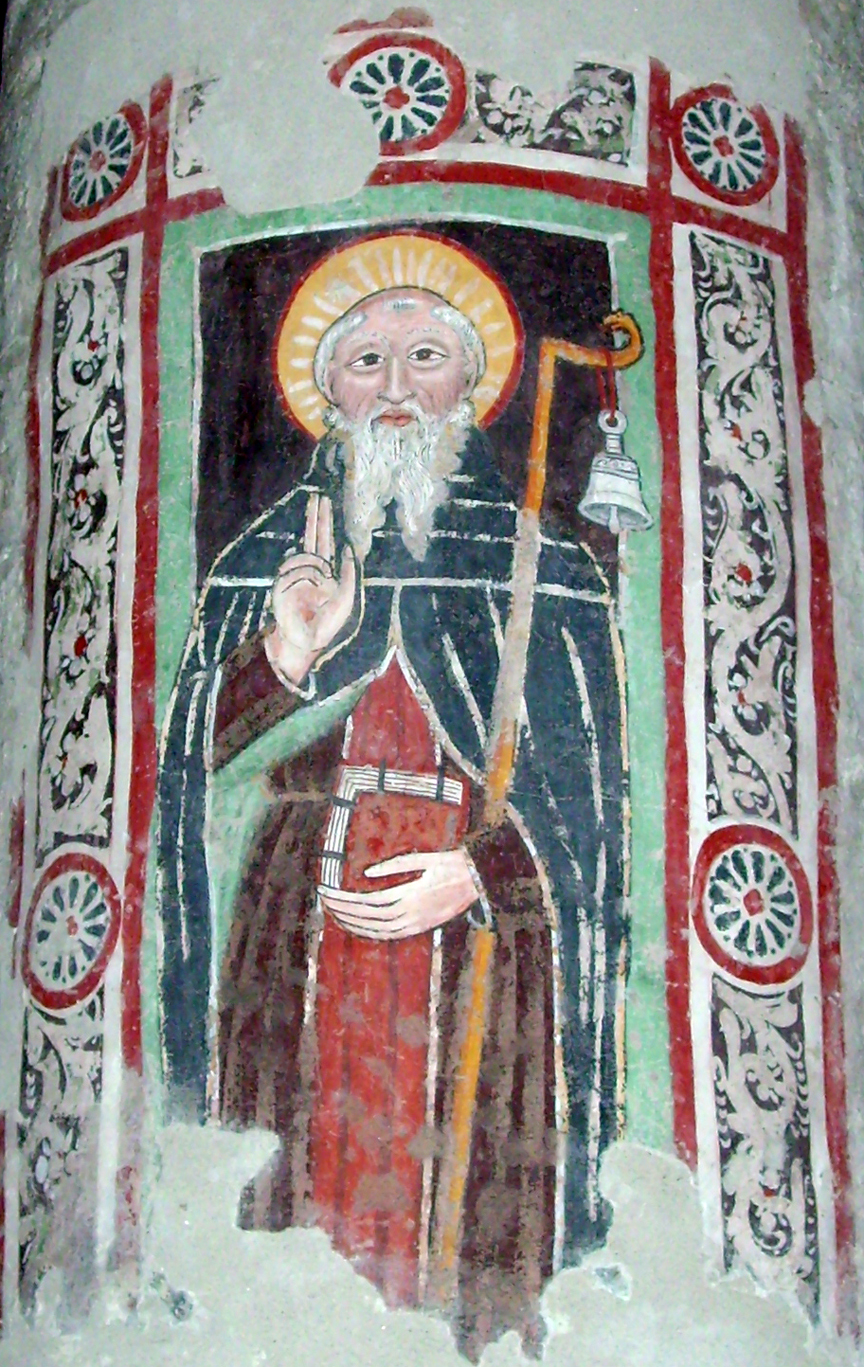
Fresco of Saint Columbanus in Brugnato Cathedral

In the fourth chapter, Columbanus presents the virtue of poverty and of overcoming greed, and that monks should be satisfied with "small possessions of utter need, knowing that greed is a leprosy for monks". Columbanus also instructs that "nakedness and disdain of riches are the first perfection of monks, but the second is the purging of vices, the third the most perfect and perpetual love of God and unceasing affection for things divine, which follows on the forgetfulness of earthly things. Since this is so, we have need of few things, according to the word of the Lord, or even of one." In the fifth chapter, Columbanus warns against vanity, reminding the monks of Jesus's warning in Luke 16:15: "You are the ones who justify yourselves in the eyes of others, but God knows your hearts. What people value highly is detestable in God's sight." In the sixth chapter, Columbanus instructs that "a monk's chastity is indeed judged in his thoughts" and warns, "What profit is it if he be virgin in body, if he be not virgin in mind? For God, being Spirit."

In the seventh chapter, Columbanus instituted a service of perpetual prayer, known as laus perennis, by which choir succeeded choir, both day and night. In the eighth chapter, Columbanus stresses the importance of discretion in the lives of monks to avoid "the downfall of some, who beginning without discretion and passing their time without a sobering knowledge, have been unable to complete a praiseworthy life". Monks are instructed to pray to God to "illumine this way, surrounded on every side by the world's thickest darkness". Columbanus continues:

So discretion has got its name from discerning, for the reason that it discerns in us between good and evil, and also between the moderate and the complete. For from the beginning either class has been divided like light and darkness, that is, good and evil, after evil began through the devil's agency to exist by the corruption of good, but through God's agency Who first illumines and then divides. Thus righteous Abel chose the good, but unrighteous Cain fell upon evil.

In the ninth chapter, Columbanus presents mortification as an essential element in the lives of monks, who are instructed, "Do nothing without counsel." Monks are warned to "beware of a proud independence, and learn true lowliness as they obey without murmuring and hesitation". According to the Rule, there are three components to mortification: "not to disagree in mind, not to speak as one pleases with the tongue, not to go anywhere with complete freedom". This mirrors the words of Jesus, "For I have come down from heaven not to do my will but to do the will of him who sent me." (John 6:38) In the tenth and final chapter, Columbanus regulates forms of penance (often corporal) for offences, and it is here that the Rule of Saint Columbanus differs significantly from that of Saint Benedict.

The Communal Rule of Columbanus required monks to fast every day until None or 3 pm; this was later relaxed and observed on designated days. Columbanus's Rule regarding diet was very strict. Monks were to eat a limited diet of beans, vegetables, flour mixed with water and a small bread of a loaf, taken in the evenings.

The habit of the monks consisted of a tunic of undyed wool, over which was worn the cuculla (cowl) of the same material. A great deal of time was devoted to various kinds of manual labour, not unlike the life in monasteries of other rules. The Rule of Saint Columbanus was approved of by the Fourth Council of Mâcon in 627, but it was superseded at the close of the century by the Rule of Saint Benedict. For several centuries in some of the greater monasteries the two rules were observed conjointly.

== Character ==
Columbanus had his faults. According to Jonas and other sources, he could be impetuous and even headstrong. These qualities were both the source of his power and the cause of his mistakes. His virtues, however, were quite remarkable. Although a strong defender of Irish traditions, he showed deep respect for the Holy See as the supreme authority. It may be that the example and success of Columba in Caledonia inspired him to similar exertions. The life of Columbanus stands as the prototype of missionary activity in Europe, followed by such men as Kilian, Vergilius of Salzburg, Donatus of Fiesole, Wilfrid, Willibrord, Suitbert of Kaiserwerdt, Boniface, and Ursicinus of Saint-Ursanne.

== Miracles ==
The following are the principal miracles attributed to his intercession:

1. Procuring food for a sick monk and curing the wife of his benefactor
2. Escaping injury while surrounded by wolves
3. Causing a bear to evacuate a cave at his bidding
4. Producing a spring of water near his cave
5. Replenishing the Luxeuil granary
6. Multiplying bread and beer for his community
7. Curing sick monks, who rose from their beds at his request to reap the harvest
8. Giving sight to a blind man at Orleans
9. Destroying with his breath a cauldron of beer prepared for a pagan festival
10. Taming a bear and yoking it to a plough

Jonas relates the occurrence of a miracle during Columbanus's time in Bregenz, when that region was experiencing a period of severe famine.

Although they were without food, they were bold and unterrified in their faith, so that they obtained food from the Lord. After their bodies had been exhausted by three days of fasting, they found so great an abundance of birds, just as the quails formerly covered the camp of the children of Israel, that the whole country near there was filled with birds. The man of God knew that this food had been scattered on the ground for his own safety and that of his brethren, and that the birds had come only because he was there. He ordered his followers first to render grateful praises to the Creator, and then to take the birds as food. And it was a wonderful and stupendous miracle; for the birds were seized according to the father's commands and did not attempt to fly away. The manna of birds remained for three days. On the fourth day, a priest from an adjacent city, warned by divine inspiration, sent a supply of grain to Saint Columban. When the supply of grain arrived, the Omnipotent, who had furnished the winged food to those in want, immediately commanded the phalanxes of birds to depart. We learned this from Eustasius, who was present with the others, under the command of the servant of God. He said that no one of them remembered ever having seen birds of such a kind before; and the food was of so pleasant savor that it surpassed royal viands. Oh, wonderful gift of divine mercy!

== Legacy ==
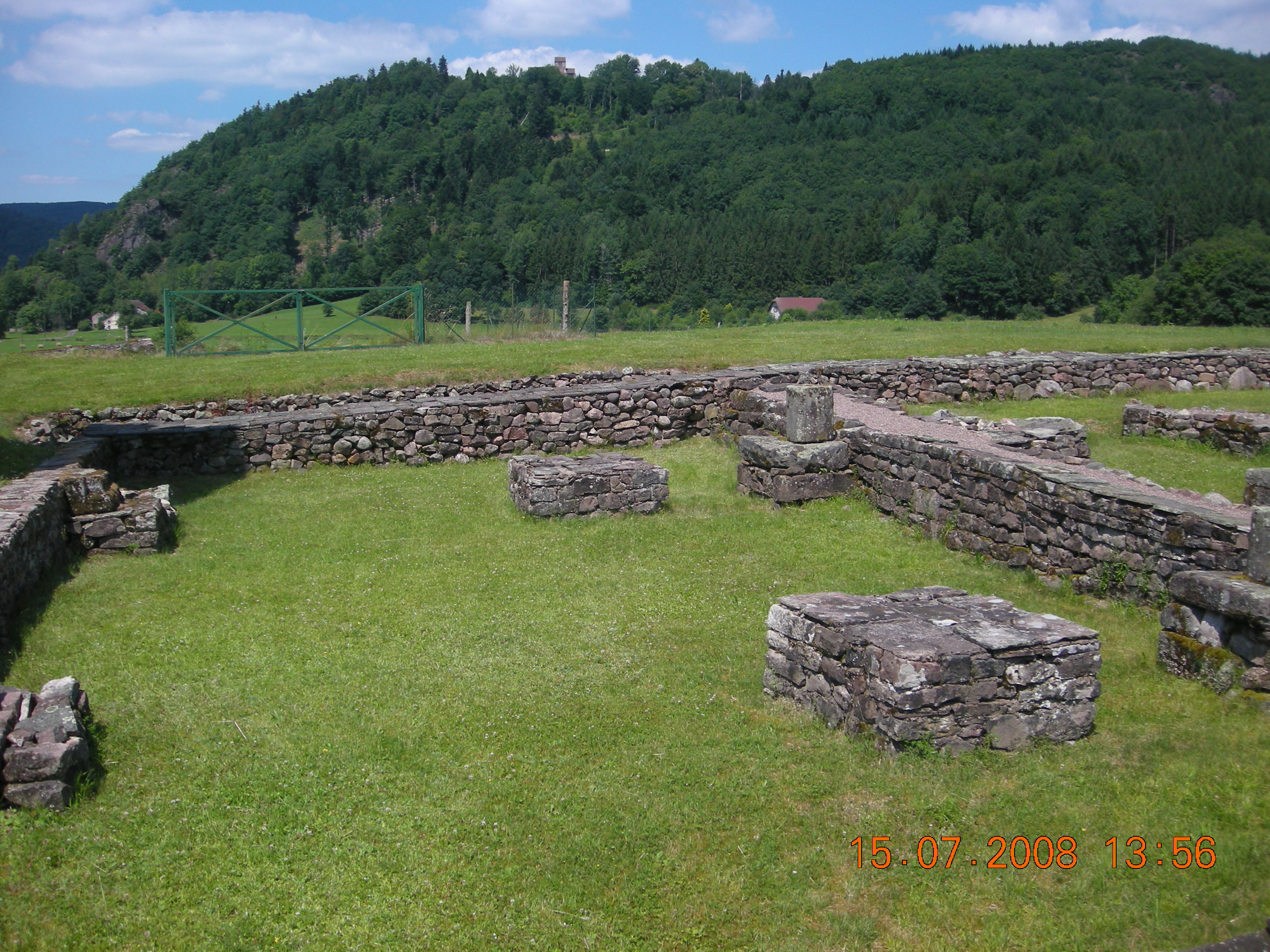
Monastery ruins at Annegray

Historian Alexander O'Hara states that Columbanus had a "very strong sense of Irish identity ... He's the first person to write about Irish identity, he's the first Irish person that we have a body of literary work from, so even on that point of view he’s very important in terms of Irish identity." In 1950 a congress celebrating the 1,400th anniversary of his birth took place in Luxeuil, France. It was attended by Robert Schuman, Seán MacBride, the future Pope John XXIII, and John A. Costello who said "All statesmen of today might well turn their thoughts to St Columban and his teaching. History records that it was by men like him that civilisation was saved in the 6th century."

Columbanus is also remembered as the first Irish person to be the subject of a biography. An Italian monk named Jonas of Bobbio wrote a biography of him some twenty years after Columbanus's death. His use of the phrase in 600 AD totius Europae (all of Europe) in a letter to Pope Gregory the Great is the first known use of the expression.

At Saint-Malo in Brittany, there is a granite cross bearing Columbanus's name to which people once came to pray for rain in times of drought. The nearby village of Saint-Coulomb commemorates him in name.

In France, the ruins of Columbanus's first monastery at Annegray are legally protected through the efforts of the Association Internationale des Amis de St Columban, which purchased the site in 1959. The association also owns and protects the site containing the cave, which served as Columbanus's cell, and the holy well that he created nearby. At Luxeuil-les-Bains, the Basilica of Saint Peter stands on the site of Columbanus's first church. A statue near the entrance, unveiled in 1947, shows him denouncing the immoral life of King Theuderic II. Formally an abbey church, the basilica contains old monastic buildings, which have been used as a minor seminary since the nineteenth century. It is dedicated to Columbanus and houses a bronze statue of him in its courtyard.

Luxeuil Abbey, described in the Catholic Encyclopedia as "the nursery of saints and apostles", produced sixty-three apostles who carried his rule, together with the Gospel, into France, Germany, Switzerland, and Italy. These disciples of Columbanus are credited with founding more than a hundred different monasteries. The canton and town still bearing the name of St. Gallen testify to how well one of his disciples succeeded.

Bobbio Abbey became a renowned centre of learning in the Early Middle Ages, so famous that it rivalled the monastic community at Monte Cassino in wealth and prestige. St. Attala continued St. Columbanus's work at Bobbio, proselytizing and collecting religious texts for the abbey's library. In Lombardy, San Colombano al Lambro in Milan, San Colombano Belmonte in Turin, and San Colombano Certénoli in Genoa all take their names from the saint.

In 2024, the XXV International Meeting of Columban Associations for the "Columban's Day 2024" took place in Piacenza, Italy. Pope Francis said Columbanus enhanced the Catholic Church and that the life and labours of the Columban monks proved decisive for the preservation and renewal of European culture.

The Missionary Society of Saint Columban, founded in 1916, and the Missionary Sisters of St. Columban, founded in 1924, are both dedicated to Columbanus.

== Veneration ==
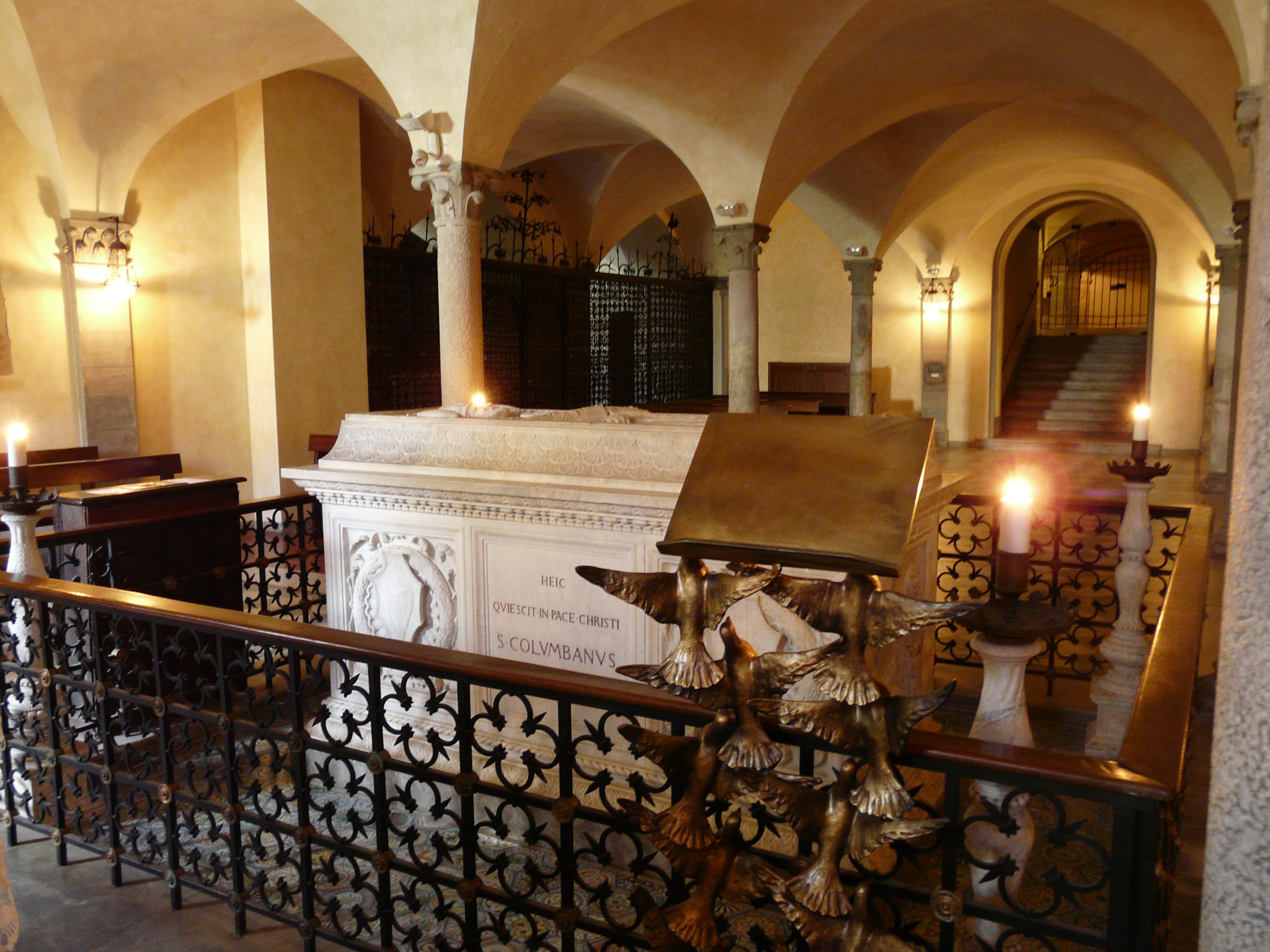
Remains of Columbanus, Bobbio Abbey crypt

The remains of Columbanus are preserved in the crypt at Bobbio Abbey. Many miracles have been credited to his intercession. In 1482, the relics were placed in a new shrine and laid beneath the altar of the crypt. The sacristy at Bobbio possesses a portion of the skull of Columbanus, his knife, wooden cup, bell, and an ancient water vessel, formerly containing sacred relics and said to have been given to him by Pope Gregory I. According to some authorities, twelve teeth of Columbanus were taken from the tomb in the fifteenth century and kept in the treasury, but these have since disappeared.

Columbanus is named in the Roman Martyrology on 23 November, which is his feast day in Ireland. His feast is observed by the Benedictines on 21 November. In art, Columbanus is represented bearded, bearing the monastic cowl, holding in his hand a book with an Irish satchel, and standing in the midst of wolves. Sometimes he is depicted in the attitude of taming a bear, or with sun-beams over his head.

The Bishop of Hereford, John Oliver, suggested Columbanus as a patron of motorcyclists because of his extensive travels through Europe during his lifetime. His patronage was declared by the Vatican in 2002.
