= La Voivre, Haute-Saône =

La Voivre
- Commune
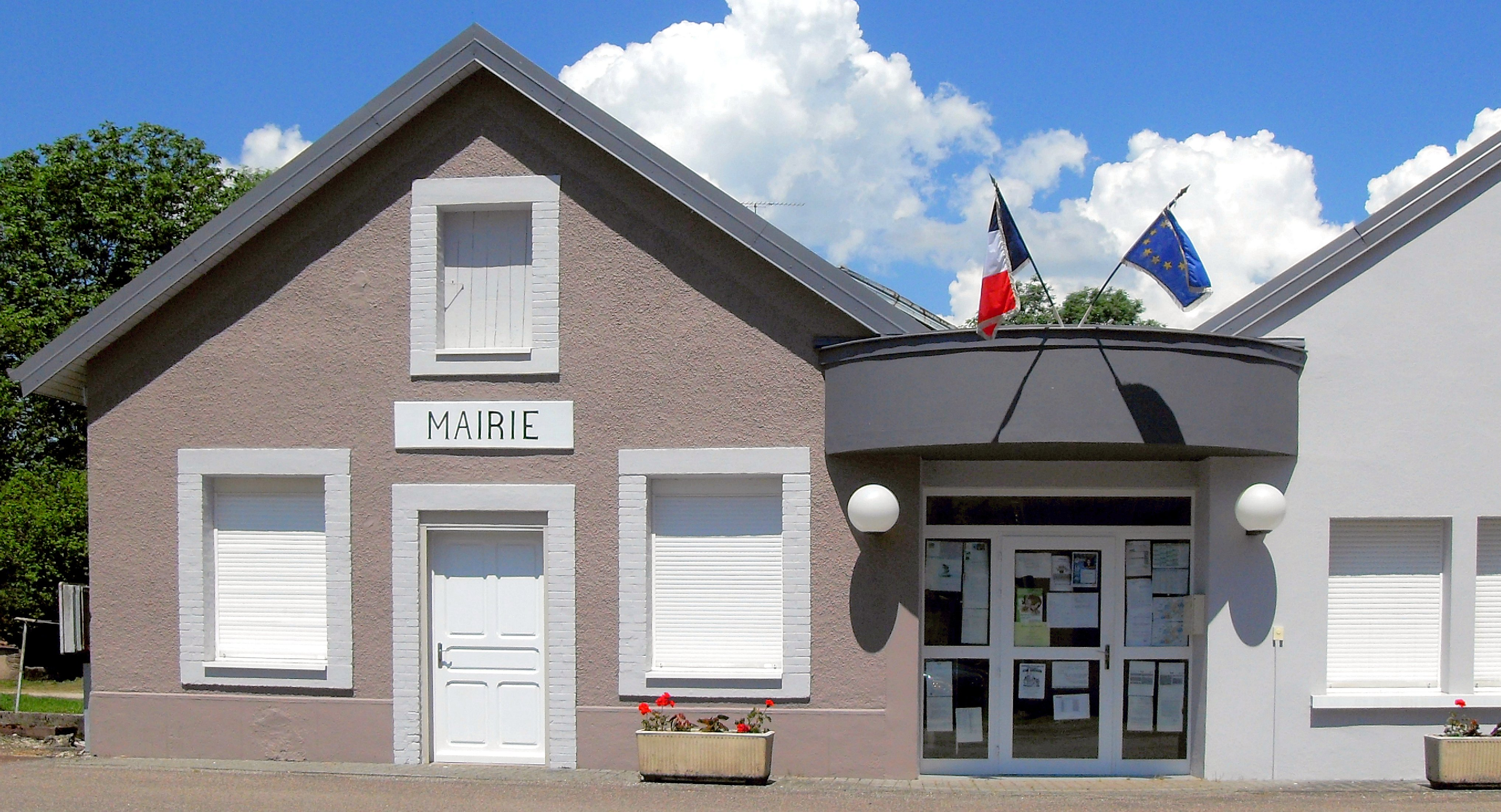
- The town hall in La Voivre
- Location of La Voivre
- Location within France Location within Bourgogne-Franche-Comté
- Coordinates: 47°49′28″N 6°32′19″E
- Country: France
- Region: Bourgogne-Franche-Comté
- Department: Haute-Saône
- Arrondissement: Lure
- Canton: Mélisey

Government
  - Mayor (2020–2026): Arnaud Formet
- Area^{1}: 11.87 km^{2} (4.58 sq mi)
- Highest elevation: 521 m (1,709 ft)
- Lowest elevation: 346 m (1,135 ft)
- Population (2023): 106
  - Density: 8.93/km^{2} (23.1/sq mi)
- Time zone: UTC+01:00 (CET)
  - Summer (DST): UTC+02:00 (CEST)
- INSEE/Postal code: 70573 /70310
- ^{1} French Land Register data, which excludes lakes, ponds, glaciers > 1 km^{2} (0.386 sq mi or 247 acres) and river estuaries.

La Voivre (French pronunciation: [la vwavʁ]) is a commune in the Haute-Saône department in the region of Bourgogne-Franche-Comté in eastern France.

== See also ==
- Communes of the Haute-Saône department
