= Fontaine-lès-Luxeuil =

- Commune
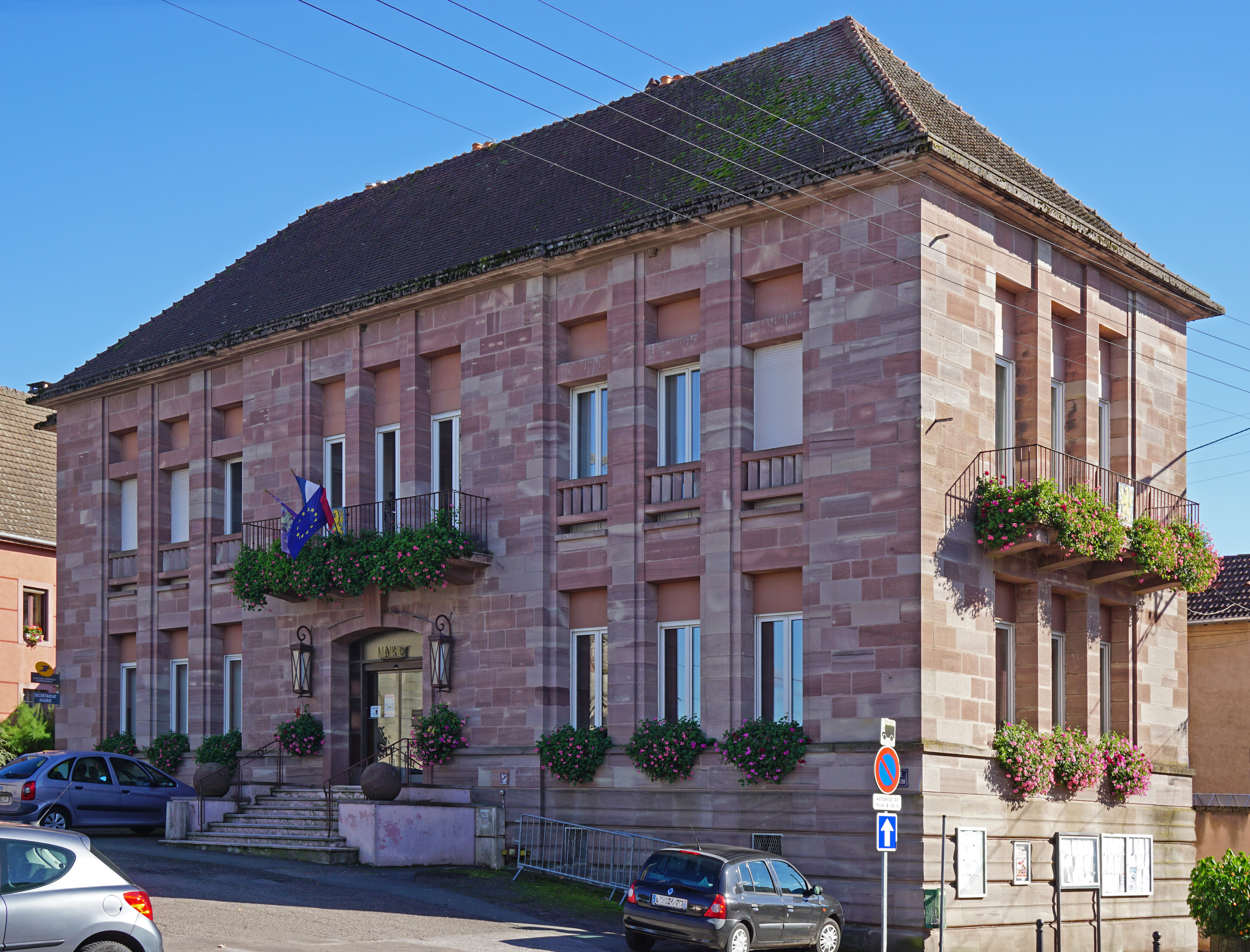
- The town hall in Fontaine-lès-Luxeuil

- Coat of arms
- Location of Fontaine-lès-Luxeuil
- Location within France Location within Bourgogne-Franche-Comté
- Coordinates: 47°51′23″N 6°20′08″E
- Country: France
- Region: Bourgogne-Franche-Comté
- Department: Haute-Saône
- Arrondissement: Lure
- Canton: Saint-Loup-sur-Semouse

Government
  - Mayor (2020–2026): Christian Chassard
- Area^{1}: 27.73 km^{2} (10.71 sq mi)
- Highest elevation: 397 m (1,302 ft)
- Lowest elevation: 247 m (810 ft)
- Population (2023): 1,327
  - Density: 47.85/km^{2} (123.9/sq mi)
- Time zone: UTC+01:00 (CET)
  - Summer (DST): UTC+02:00 (CEST)
- INSEE/Postal code: 70240 /70800
- ^{1} French Land Register data, which excludes lakes, ponds, glaciers > 1 km^{2} (0.386 sq mi or 247 acres) and river estuaries.

Fontaine-lès-Luxeuil (French pronunciation: [fɔ̃tɛn lɛ lyksœj], literally Fontaine near Luxeuil) is a commune in the Haute-Saône department in the region of Bourgogne-Franche-Comté in eastern France.

== See also ==
- Communes of the Haute-Saône department
