= Saint Attala =

Italian Roman Catholic saint

Attala
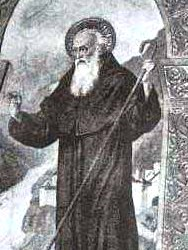
- Born: Burgundy
- Died: 622
- Feast: March 10

Attala or Atala (died 622) was a disciple of Columbanus and his successor as abbot of Bobbio from 615.

Attala was originally from Burgundy, and first became a monk at the abbey of Lérins. Displeased with the loose discipline prevailing there, he instead entered the abbey of Luxeuil, which had just been founded by Columbanus. When the latter was expelled from Luxeuil by King Theuderic II, Attala would have succeeded him as abbot, but preferred to follow him into exile. They settled on the banks of the river Trebbia, a little northeast of Genoa, where they together founded Bobbio.

After the Columbanus' death in 615, Attala succeeded him as abbot. During Attala's abbacy King Adaloald a Catholic issued a royal diploma at his request, which confirmed earlier donations to the monastery at Bibbio and granted the monastery more land around Monte Penice. He and his monks suffered many hardships at the hands of King Arioald, who was an Arian and not a Catholic. As abbot, Attala insisted on strict discipline and when a large number of his monks rebelled, declaring his discipline too rigorous, he permitted them to leave the monastery. According to Attala's biographer, Jonas, when some of these monks perished miserably, the others considered their deaths a punishment from God and returned to the monastery. Attala also restored the binding of the books in the monastic library. A surviving palimpsest copy of the works of Ulfilas bears the inscription "a book from the cupboard of lord Atala" (l[iber] de arca domno atalani).

Attala was buried in Bobbio, where his liturgical feast is celebrated on March 10.
