= Bobbio Abbey =

Monastery in Italy

Coordinates: 44°46′00″N 9°23′13″E

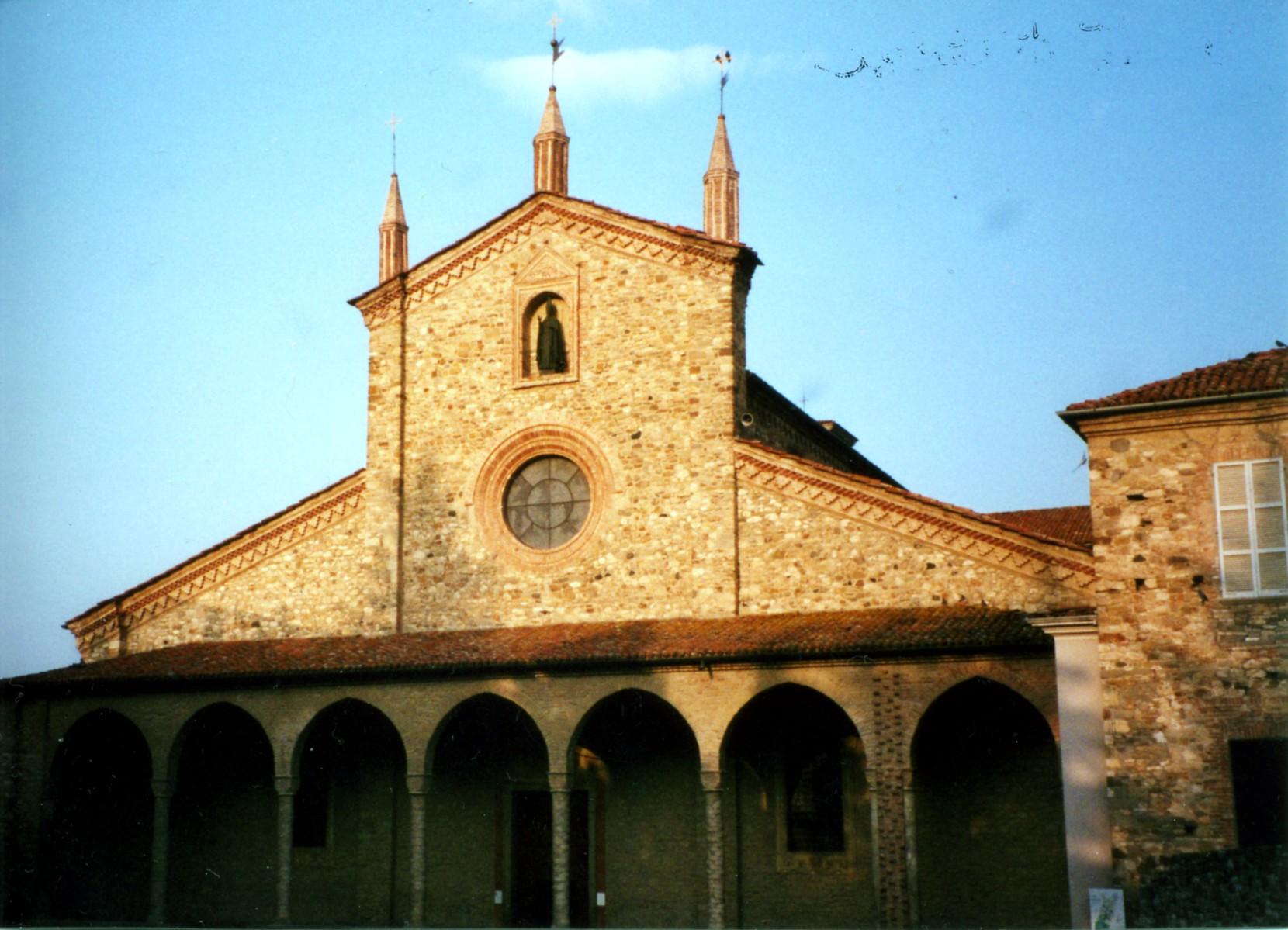
The basilica of San Colombano

Bobbio Abbey (Italian: Abbazia di San Colombano) is a monastery founded by Irish Saint Columbanus in 614, around which later grew up the town of Bobbio, in the province of Piacenza, Emilia-Romagna, Italy. It is dedicated to Saint Columbanus. It was famous as a centre of resistance to Arianism and as one of the greatest libraries in the Middle Ages. The abbey was dissolved under the French administration in 1803, although many of the buildings remain in other uses.

== History ==
=== Foundation ===
The abbey was founded soon after the Lombard invasion of Italy in 568. The Lombard king Agilulf married the devout Roman Catholic Theodelinda in 590, and under the influence of the Irish missionary Columbanus and Theodelinda, Agilulf converted to Christianity. Upon the conversion of Agigulf and his Lombard followers, the king granted Columbanus a ruined church and wasted lands known as Ebovium, which prior to the Lombard seizure, had been property of the papacy. Columbanus particularly wanted this secluded place, for while enthusiastic for the conversion of the Lombards, he preferred eremitic solitude for his monks and himself. Next to this little church, dedicated to Saint Peter, a monastery was soon built. The abbey at its foundation followed the Rule of St Columbanus, based on the monastic practices of Celtic Christianity.

=== 7th century ===
Columbanus was buried on 23 November 615, but was followed by successors of high calibre in Attala (d. 627) and Bertulf (d. 640), who steered the new monastery through the threats from militant Arianism under King Rotharis (636–652).

In 628, when Bertulf made a pilgrimage to Rome, he persuaded Pope Honorius I to exempt Bobbio from episcopal jurisdiction, thus making the abbey immediately subject to the Holy See. Under the next abbot, Bobolen, the Rule of St. Benedict was introduced. At first its observance was optional, but in the course of time it superseded the stricter Rule of Saint Columbanus, and Bobbio joined the Congregation of Monte Cassino. In 643, at the request of Rotharis and Queen Gundeberga, Pope Theodore I granted to the Abbot of Bobbio the use of the mitre and other pontificals.

During the turbulent 7th century and through the efforts of Columbanus's disciples, increasing numbers of Arian Lombards were received into the Catholic form of Christianity. However, during the first half of the 7th century, the large tract of country lying between Turin and Verona, Genoa and Milan, remained a relatively lawless state, with a mix of Arian and pagan religious practice. Bobbio became a centre of resistance to Arianism and a base for the conversion of the Lombard people. It was not until the reign of Grimoald I (663–673), himself a convert, that the bulk of the Lombards accepted Catholic Christianity.

=== 8th century onwards ===
Theodelinda's nephew Aripert I (653–663) restored all the lands of Bobbio that belonged by right to the pope. Aripert II confirmed this restitution to Pope John VII in 707. The Lombards soon dispossessed the popes again, but in 756 Aistulf was compelled by Pepin the Younger to give up the lands. In 774 Charlemagne made liberal grants to the abbey. In the last decades of the 9th century, Abbot Agilulph moved the monastery complex farther downstream on the left bank of the river Trebbia. The medieval village started to grow around the large monastery area.

Over time, the cultural and political importance of the Abbey grew; in 1153 Frederick Barbarossa confirmed by two charters various rights and possessions. The fame of Bobbio reached the shores of Ireland, and Columbanus' reputation attracted many more Irish religious. Bobolen's successor may have been a certain 'Comgall'. Bishop Cumianus, who had resigned his see in Ireland to become a monk of Bobbio, died in the abbey in about 736, as his poetic inscription there attests.

=== See of Bobbio ===
In 1014, the Emperor Henry II, on the occasion of his own coronation in Rome, obtained from Pope Benedict VIII the erection of Bobbio as an episcopal see. The diocese was made a suffragan of the metropolitan of Milan. Peter Aldus, its first bishop, had been abbot of Bobbio since 999, and his episcopal successors for a long time lived in the abbey, where many of them had been monks. From 1133 Bobbio was a suffragan see of the archdiocese of Genoa. From time to time disputes arose between the bishop and the monks, and in 1199 Pope Innocent III issued two bulls, restoring the abbey in spirituals and temporals, and empowering the bishop to depose an abbot if within a certain time he did not obey.

=== Dissolution ===
Saint Columbanus' abbey and church were taken from the Benedictines by the French occupying forces in 1803, when the abbey was suppressed.

Since 1923 the title of Abbot of San Colombano was restored and united ex officio to the Bishop of Bobbio (after 1989 to the Bishop of Piacenza-Bobbio).

== Basilica ==
The current Basilica of San Colombano was built during 1456–1530 in a Renaissance style. The Basilica has a Latin cross layout with a nave and two aisles, a transept and a rectangular apse. It includes a 9th-century baptismal font. The nave fresco decoration was completed in the 16th century by Bernardino Lanzani. The 15th-century crypt houses the sarcophagus of St. Columbanus, by Giovanni dei Patriarchi (1480), and those of the first two abbots, St. Attala and St. Bertulf. Also in the crypt is a 12th-century pavement mosaic with the histories of the Maccabeans and the Cycle of the Months. No structures of the earliest monastery buildings are visible.

The bell-tower (late 9th century) and the smaller apse are from the original Romanesque edifice. The Torre del Comune (Communal Tower) was built in 1456–85.

== Museums ==
The Museum of the Abbey includes findings and remains from Roman (tombs, altars, sculptures) and Lombard ages (capitals, tombstones). It houses also a polyptych by Bernardino Luini and the Bobbio collection, the second largest in the world, of Monza ampullae, pilgrimage flasks from the 6th century.

The cloisters of the abbey house a display of Collezione Mazzolini. The collection of nearly 900 works was donated in 2005 by Domenica Rosa Mazzolini to the diocese of Piacenza-Bobbio Part of the collection was amassed earlier by the sister of the physician Giovanni Battista Ettore Simonetti. The collection includes works by Enrico Baj, Renato Birolli, Carlo Carrà, Massimo Campigli, Giuseppe Capogrossi, Giorgio de Chirico, Filippo De Pisis, Ottone Rosai, Lucio Fontana, Achille Funi, Piero Manzoni, Mario Nigro, Giò Pomodoro, and Mario Sironi.

== Library ==
The nucleus of the abbey's library may have been formed by the manuscripts which Columbanus had brought from Ireland (though these must have been exceedingly few) and the treatises which he wrote himself. The learned Saint Dungal (d. after 827) bequeathed to the abbey his valuable library, consisting of some 27 volumes.

A late 9th-century catalogue, published by Lodovico Antonio Muratori (but now superseded by the edition of M. Tosi), shows that at that period every branch of knowledge, divine and human, was represented in this library. The catalogue lists more than 600 volumes. Many of the books have been lost, the rest have long since been dispersed and are still reckoned among the chief treasures of the later collections which possess them.

In 1616 Cardinal Federico Borromeo took for the Ambrosian Library of Milan eighty-six volumes, including the famous "Bobbio Orosius", the "Antiphonary of Bangor", and the Bobbio Jerome, a palimpsest of Ulfilas' Gothic version of the Bible. Twenty-six volumes were given, in 1618, to Pope Paul V for the Vatican Library. Many others were sent to Turin, where, besides those in the Royal Archives, there were seventy-one in the University Library until the disastrous fire of 26 January 1904.

Gerbert of Aurillac (afterwards Pope Sylvester II) became abbot of Bobbio in 982, and with the aid of the numerous ancient treatises he found there, composed his celebrated work on geometry.

== Burials ==
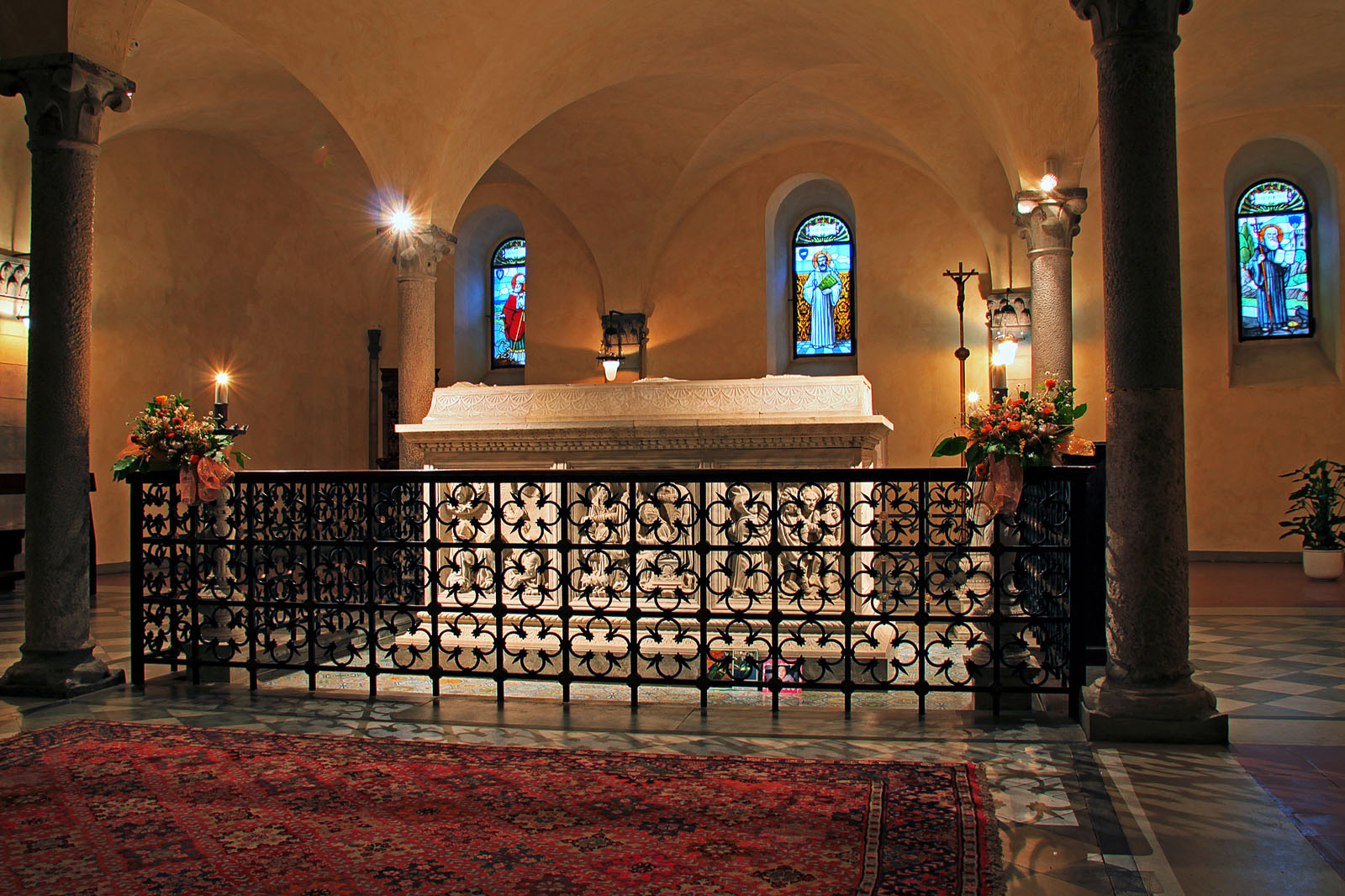
The sepulchral ark of Saint Columbanus from 1480

- Cumianus
- Columbanus
- Saint Attala (†622)
- Saint Barbolenus, fourth Abbot of Bobbio. (†639) his Feast Day is 31 August.
- Saint Baudacarius, a monk at Bobbio and died around 650 AD. His Feast Day is 21 December.
- Bladulf

== See also ==
- List of Merovingian monasteries
- List of Carolingian monasteries
