= Chronological list of saints in the 7th century =

A list of people, who died during the 7th century, who have received recognition as Blessed (through beatification) or Saint (through canonization) from the Catholic Church:

== Saints ==
| Name | Birth | Birthplace | Death | Place of death | Notes |
|---|---|---|---|---|---|
| Aetherius | | | 602 | | Bishop of Lyon |
| Comgall | 516 | | 602 | | |
| Anacharius (Aunaire) | | | 603 | | Bishop of Auxerre |
| Fintan of Cloneenagh | | | 603 | | |
| Gregory of Agrigento | | | 603 | | Bishop of Agrigento |
| Augustine of Canterbury | | | 604 | | Bishop of Canterbury |
| Gregory the Great | 540 | | 604 | | pope |
| Aredius of Gap | | | 605 | | Archbishop of Gap |
| John Climacus | 525 | | 605 | | |
| Peter the Deacon | | | 605 | | |
| Venantius Fortunatus | | | 605 | | Bishop of Poitiers |
| Paterius | | | 606 | | Bishop of Brescia |
| Peter of Canterbury | | | 606 | | |
| Didier (Desiderius of Vienne) | 558 | | 607 | | Bishop of Vienne |
| Eulogius of Alexandria | | | 608 | | |
| Glodesind | | | 608 | | |
| Anastasius XII | | | 609 | Antioch | |
| Artemius | | | 609 | | Bishop of Sens |
| John | | | 609 | | Bishop of Syracuse |
| Licinius of Angers | | | 609 | | Bishop of Angers |
| Mo Lua of Killaloe (Lughaidh, Molua) | | | 609 | | |
| Anastasius XIII | | | 610 | | Bishop of Brescia |
| Drostan | | | 610 | | |
| Lupus of Châlons | | | 610 | | Bishop of Châlons-sur-Saône |
| Virgilius of Arles | 530 | | 610 | | |
| Colman of Lann Elo | 555 | | 612 | | Bishop of Connor |
| Dominic | | | 612 | | Bishop of Brescia |
| Florentina | | | 612 | | |
| Theodore of Sykeon | | | 613 | | Bishop of Anastasiopol |
| Ceraunus | | | 614 | | Bishop of Paris |
| Forty-Four Martyrs of Palestine | | | 614 | | |
| Mungo | 518 | | 614 | | |
| Boniface IV | | | 615 | | pope |
| Columbanus | 530 | | 615 | | |
| Æthelberht | 560 | | 616 | | |
| Cronan "the Tanner" | | | 617 | | |
| Wendalinus (Wendelinus) | | | 617 | | |
| Donnán of Eigg | | maybe Ireland | 617 | Eigg | martyr |
| Adeodatus I | | | 618 | | pope |
| Kevin of Glendalough | | | 618 | | |
| John the Almsgiver | 555 | | 619 | | |
| Lawrence of Canterbury | | | 619 | | |
| Basolus (Basle) | 555 | | 620 | | |
| Merinus (Meadhran, Merryn) | | | 620 | | |
| Deiniol | | | 621 | | |
| Desiderius | | | 621 | | Bishop of Auxerre |
| Attalas | | | 622 | | |
| Walericus (Valery) | | | 622 | | |
| Bertrand (Bishop of Le Mans) | | | 623 | | Bishop of Le Mans |
| Betharius (Bohaire, Boetharius) | | | 623 | | Bishop of Chartres |
| Lupus (Leu) | | | 623 | | Bishop of Sens |
| Austregisilus (Outril) | 551 | | 624 | | Bishop of Bourges |
| Mellitus | | | 624 | | |
| Deicolus (Desle) | | | 625 | | |
| Gagericus (Gau, Gery) | | | 625 | | Bishop of Cambrai |
| Salvius (Salve, Sauve) | | | 625 | | Bishop of Amiens |
| Ursicinus | | | 625 | | |
| Vitalis of Gaza | | | 625 | | |
| Aidan (Edan, Modoc, or Maedoc) | | | 626 | | Bishop of Ferns |
| Amatus | | | 627 | | |
| Justus | | | 627 | | |
| Anastasius the Persian (Anastasius XIV) | | | 628 | | |
| Anastasius XV (Anastasius II) | | | 628 | | Bishop of Pavia |
| Blidulf (Bladulph) | | | 630 | | |
| Conwall (Conval) | | | 630 | | |
| Flavitus (Flaive) | | | 630 | | |
| Fulgentius | | | 630 | | Bishop of Ecija |
| Enogatus | | | 631 | | Bishop of Aleth |
| Colman of Kilmacduagh | 550 | | 632 | | |
| Cagnoald (Chainoaldus, Cagnou) | | | 633 | | Bishop of Laon |
| Edwin of Northumbria | | | 633 | | |
| Finbar (Barry) | | | 633 | | |
| Renovatus | | | 633 | | Bishop of Mérida |
| Amabilis(Mable) | | | 634 | | |
| Sigeberht of East Anglia | | | 634 | | |
| Fintán of Taghmon (Mun, Munnu, Mundus) | | | 635 | | |
| Isidore | 560 | | 636 | | Bishop of Seville |
| Fergna "the White" | | | 637 | | |
| Tanca | | | 637 | | |
| Sophronius | 550 | | 638 | | |
| Acharius | | | 639 | | Bishop of Noyon-Tournai |
| Carthage (Carthach the Younger, Mochuda) | | | 637 | | |
| Laserian (Laisren, Molaisse) | | | 639 | | |
| Mochelloc | | | 639 | | |
| Alena (Aline) | | | 640 | | |
| Arnulf (Arnoul, Arnuiph) | 582 | | 640 | | Bishop of Metz |
| Bertulf (Bertuiph) | | | 640 | | |
| Ernan of Cluvain-Deoghra | | | 640 | | year of death c. 640, exact year unknown |
| Cronan of Roscrea | | | 640 | | |
| Ferreolus (Ernan) | | | 640 | | |
| Leontius of Saintes | | | 640 | | Bishop of Saintes |
| Romanus of Rouen | | | 640 | | Bishop of Rouen |
| Blessed Pepin of Landen | | | 640 | | |
| Syra of Troyes | | | 640 | | Irish nun |
| Romulus of Genoa | | | 641 | | Bishop of Genoa |
| Oswald | | | 642 | | |
| Goericus (Abbo, Goericus) | | | 643 | | Bishop of Metz |
| Peregrinus | | | 643 | | |
| Paulinus | 584 | | 644 | | Bishop of York |
| Trudpert | | | 644 | | |
| Victorinus | | | 644 | | Bishop of Como |
| Modoaldus (Romoaldus) | | | 645 | | Bishop of Trier |
| Monon | | | 645 | | |
| Mura McFeredach (Muran, Murames) | | | 645 | | |
| Riquier (Richarius) | | | 645 | | |
| Gall | 550 | | 646 | | |
| Ethelburga of Lyminge | | | 647 | | |
| Sulpicius II (Sulpice, Pius) | | | 647 | | Bishop of Bourges |
| Birinus | | | 649 | | Bishop of Dorchester |
| Gertrude of Hamay | | | 649 | | Grandmother of St Adalbard of Ostrevent and great-grandmother of Sts Adalsinda and Eusebia |
| Paul | | | 649 | | Bishop of Verdun |
| Ernan of Torach | | | 650 | | abbot |
| Agilus (Ayeul) | | | 650 | | |
| Aquilinus | | | 650 | | |
| Baldomerus (Galmier) | | | 650 | | |
| Dymphna and Gerebernus | | | 650 | | |
| Fursey | | | 650 | | |
| Leobald (Leotlebod) | | | 650 | | |
| Maroveus | | | 650 | | |
| Osmanna (Argariarga) | | | 650 | | |
| Titian | | | 650 | | |
| Winifred (Guinevra, Gwenfrewi, Winefride) | | | 650 | | |
| Oswine of Deira | | | 651 | Yorkshire | King of Northumbria |
| Aidan | | | 651 | | Bishop of Lindisfarne |
| Braulio of Zaragoza | 587 | | 651 | | Bishop of Saragossa |
| Adalbard I of Ostrevent | | | 652 | | |
| Foillan | | | 652 | | |
| Haduin (Harduin) | | | 653 | | Bishop of Le Mans |
| Honorius | | | 653 | | |
| Irene | | | 653 | | |
| Romaric | | | 653 | | |
| Ultan of Ardbraccan | | | 653 | | |
| Benedict | | | 654 | | Bishop of Sebaste |
| Burgundofara | 600 | | 655 | | |
| Didier (Desiderius) | 590 | | 655 | | Bishop of Cahors |
| Foillan | | | 655 | | |
| Madelgisilus (Mauguille, Maguil, Mauguil) | | | 655 | | |
| Martin I | | | 655 | | pope |
| Molagga (Laicin) | | | 655 | | |
| Sigiramnus (Cyran) | | | 655 | | |
| Felix of Brescia | | | 656 | | Bishop of Brescia |
| Ithamar (bishop) | | | 656 | | Bishop of Rochester |
| Mochoemoc (Machaemhog, Puicherius, Vuicherius) | | | 656 | | |
| Sigebert III of Austrasia | 631 | | 656 | | |
| Domnus | | | 657 | | Bishop of Vienne |
| Eugenius I | | | 657 | | pope |
| Hieu | | | 657 | | |
| Livinus (Lebwin) | | | 657 | | |
| Annemund (Annemundus, St Chamond) | | | 658 | | Bishop of Lyon |
| Diman | | | 658 | | |
| Geremarus (Germer) | | | 658 | | |
| Judicaël | 590 | | 658 | | King of Domnonia & Brittany |
| Bavo (Allowin) | 589 | | 659 | | |
| Colman of Glendalough | | | 659 | | |
| Gertrude of Nivelles | 626 | | 659 | | |
| Antoninus | | | 660 | | |
| Blitmund | | | 660 | | |
| Clarus | | | 660 | | |
| Donatus of Besançon | | | 660 | | Bishop of Besançon |
| Elias | | | 660 | | Bishop of Syracuse |
| Eligius (Eloi) | 590 | | 660 | | Bishop of Noyon |
| Etto (Ze) | | | 660 | | |
| Eusebia of Hamage | 637 | | 660 | | Abbess of Hamage |
| Florbert | | | 660 | | |
| John Camillus the Good | | | 660 | | Bishop of Milan |
| Racho (Ragnobert) | | | 660 | | Bishop of Autun |
| Saethryth (Sethrida) | | | 660 | | |
| Theodichildis (Telchildis) | | | 660 | | |
| Thomian (Toiman) | | | 660 | | |
| Zosimus | | | 660 | | Bishop of Syracuse |
| Boisil (Boswell) | | | 661 | | |
| Landericus (Landry) | | | 661 | | Bishop of Paris |
| Palladius | | | 661 | | Bishop of Auxerre |
| Cummian Fada | | | 662 | | |
| Rumwold | 662 | King's Sutton | 662 | | Infant saint, by tradition born and died at Walton Grounds, near the village of King's Sutton, Northamptonshire |
| Hadulph | | | 662 | | Bishop of Arras Cambrai |
| Maximus the Confessor | 580 | | 662 | | |
| Pelinus of Brindisi | | | 662 | | |
| Cunibert | | | 663 | | Bishop of Cologne |
| Aileran (Sapiens the Wise) | | | 664 | | |
| Cedd | | | 664 | | |
| Deusdedit (Freithona) | | | 664 | | |
| Tuda of Lindisfarne | | | 664 | | Bishop of Lindisfarne |
| Féchín of Fore | | | 665 | | |
| Fructuosus of Braga | | | 665 | | Bishop of Braga |
| Gibitrudis | | | 665 | | |
| Patricia of Naples | | | 665 | | |
| Eloque (Eloquius) | | | 666 | | |
| Aurea | | | 667 | | |
| Ildefonsus of Toledo | 606 | | 667 | | |
| Adrian | | | 668 | | |
| Landoald | | | 668 | | |
| Waldebert (Walbert, Gaubert) | | | 668 | | |
| Wandrille (Wandregisilus) | 600 | | 668 | | |
| Aubert (Autbert) | | | 669 | | Bishop of Cambrai-Arras |
| Jodoc (Josse) | | | 669 | | |
| Serenidus | | | 669 | | |
| Æthelred and Æthelberht | | | 669 | | murdered Kentish princes |
| Adalgesus | | | 670 | | |
| Leudinus Bodo | | | 670 | | Bishop of Toul |
| Fiacre | | | 670 | | |
| Goban (Gobain) | | | 670 | | |
| Hildemarca | | | 670 | | |
| Maxellendis | | | 670 | | |
| Omer (Audomarus) | | | 670 | | |
| Theodard | | | 670 | | Bishop of Maastricht |
| Wilfretrudis | | | 670 | | |
| Blessed Ferreolus | | | 670 | | Bishop of Grenoble |
| Babolen | | | 671 | | |
| Basinus | | | 672 | | Bishop of Trier |
| Chad (Ceadda) | | | 672 | | Bishop of Mercia |
| Faro | | | 672 | | Bishop of Meaux |
| Lactali | | | 672 | | |
| Vincentian | | | 672 | | |
| Vitalian | | | 672 | | pope |
| Frodobert | | | 673 | | |
| Remaclus | | | 673 | | Bishop of Maastricht |
| Drausinus (Drausius) | | | 674 | | Bishop of Soissons |
| Amandus (Amand) | 584 | | 675 | | |
| Colman | | | 675 | | Bishop of Lindisfarne |
| Emilian (Eminian, Imelin) | | | 675 | | |
| Frugentius | | | 675 | | |
| Gebetrude (Gertrude) | | | 675 | | |
| Germanus of Granfelden | | | 675 | | |
| Goeznoveus (Guesnoveus, Governou) | | | 675 | | Bishop of Quimper |
| Placid | | | 675 | | |
| Aigulf | | | 676 | | |
| Amarinus | | | 676 | | Abbot |
| Ampelius | | | 676 | | Bishop of Milan |
| Gerinus | | | 676 | | |
| Gundebert (Gondelbert, Gumbert) | | | 676 | | Bishop of Sens |
| Mildgytha | | | 676 | | |
| Praejectus (Prix, Prest, or Preils) | | | 676 | | |
| Vincent Madelgarius | 615 | | 677 | | |
| Arbogast (Arascach) | | | 678 | | |
| Mummolus (Mommulus) | | | 678 | | |
| Nathalan | | | 678 | | Bishop of Tullicht |
| Dagobert II | | | 679 | | |
| Deodatus of Nevers (Die, Didier) | | | 679 | | Bishop of Nevers |
| Etheldreda (Audrey) | 630 | | 679 | | |
| Hunna (Huva) | | | 679 | | |
| Kiara (Chier) | | | 679 | | |
| Leodegar (Leger, Leodegarius) | | | 679 | | Bishop of Autun |
| Adalsindis (Adalasinda, Adalisinda, Adalsinda, Adalsinde) | | Hainault | 680 | | Daughter of Richrudis, the Abbess of Marchiennes Abbey; sister of Eusebia, Abbess of Abbaye d'Hamage |
| Adamnan of Coldingham | | | 680 | | |
| Adulf | | | 680 | | Bishop of Utrecht |
| Agilberta | | | 680 | | |
| Baldwin | | | 680 | | |
| Bathildis | | | 680 | | |
| Berarius | | | 680 | | Bishop of Le Mans |
| Botolph (Botulf) | | | 680 | | |
| Cædmon | | | 680 | | |
| Columbinus | | | 680 | | |
| Curcodomus | | | 680 | | |
| Eusebia (Eusébie, Eusoye, Isoie, Ysoir) | | | 680 | | Abbess of Abbey of Hamay; daughter of Richrudis, Abbess of Marchiennes Abbey |
| Ghislain (Gislenus) | | | 680 | | |
| Hilda | 614 | | 680 | | |
| Kyneburga | | | 680 | | |
| Lambert and Valerius | | | 680 | | |
| Modesta | | | 680 | | |
| Owen | | | 680 | | |
| Pascharius (Pasquier) | | | 680 | | Bishop of Nantes |
| [Rambert(Rambertus, Ragnebert, Ragnobert) | | | 680 | | |
| Serenicus | | | 680 | | |
| Severa | | | 680 | | |
| Ternatius | | | 680 | | Bishop of Besançon |
| Agatho | | | 681 | | pope |
| Barbatus | 612 | | 682 | | Bishop of Benevento |
| Raverein | | | 682 | | |
| Leo II | | | 683 | | pope |
| Mummolin (Moulin, Mommolenus, Mummolinus) | | | 683 | | Bishop of Noyon |
| Waningus (Vaneng) | | | 683 | | |
| Aldegundis | 635 | | 684 | | |
| Conan | | | 684 | | |
| Philibert | 608 | | 684 | | |
| Agilbert | | | 685 | | Bishop of Paris |
| Benedict II | | | 685 | | pope |
| Catald (Cataldus) | | | 685 | | Bishop of Taranto |
| Condedus (Conde, Condede) | | | 685 | | |
| Framechildis (Frameuze) | | | 685 | | |
| Vigilius | | | 685 | | Bishop of Auxerre |
| Adalgis | | | 686 | | |
| Arwald | | | 686 | | |
| Domitian and Hadelin | | | 686 | | |
| Eata | | | 686 | | |
| Erhard | | | 686 | | Bishop of Regensburg |
| Esterwine | | | 686 | | |
| Ethelburga of Barking | | | 686 | | |
| Landelinus | | | 686 | | |
| Aichardus (Archard) | | | 687 | | |
| Bertilia of Mareuil | | | 687 | | |
| Cuthbert | 634 | | 687 | | Bishop of Lindisfarne |
| Herbert | | | 687 | | |
| Anstrudis (Austrude) | 645 | | 688 | | |
| Lambert | | | 688 | | Bishop of Lyon |
| Richrudis | | Gascony | 688 | | Abbess of Marchiennes Abbey |
| Waldetrudis (Waudru) | | | 688 | | |
| Avitus II | | | 689 | | Bishop of Clermont |
| Cadwallader (Cadwalla, Ceadwalla) | 659 | | 689 | | |
| Amatus | | | 690 | | Bishop of Sens |
| Amalberga | | | 690 | | |
| Autbod (Autbodus) | | | 690 | | |
| Benedict | 628 | | 690 | | |
| Bertha of Val d'Or | | | 690 | | |
| Calminius (Calmilius) | | | 690 | | |
| Boniface Curitan | | | 690 | | Bishop of Ross |
| Emmeramus | | | 690 | | Bishop of Bavaria |
| Fromundus | | | 690 | | Bishop of Coutances |
| Gerbold | | | 690 | | Bishop of Bayeux |
| Godo (Gaon) | | | 690 | | |
| Godwin | | | 690 | | |
| Hadelinus | | | 690 | | |
| Hereswitha | | | 690 | | |
| Huno | | | 690 | | |
| Hyacinth | | | 690 | | |
| Hygbald (Higbald, Hugbald, Hybald) | | | 690 | | |
| John (Joannes) | | | 690 | | Bishop of Bergamo |
| Jonatus | | | 690 | | |
| Julian of Toledo | 642 | | 690 | | |
| Landrada | | | 690 | | |
| Mummolus (Momble, Mumbolus, Momleolus) | | | 690 | | |
| Ritbert | | | 690 | | |
| Sigfrid | | | 690 | | |
| Theodore of Tarsus | 602 | | 690 | | |
| Theoffroy | | | 690 | | |
| Theofrid | | | 690 | | |
| Wigbert | | | 690 | | |
| Ywi | | | 690 | | |
| Bertilla | | | 692 | | |
| Begga | | | 693 | | |
| Erconwald | | | 693 | | Bishop of London |
| Sæbbi (Sebbe) | | | 694 | | |
| Angadresma (Angadrisma, Amgadreme) | 615 | | 695 | | |
| Ansbert (Aubert) | | | 695 | | Bishop of Rouen |
| Aquilinus | 620 | | 695 | | Bishop of Évreux |
| Decorosus | | | 695 | | Bishop of Capua |
| Ewald the Dark and Ewald the Fair | | | 695 | | |
| Guerembaldus | | | 695 | | Bishop of Hirschau |
| Oduvald | | | 695 | | |
| Valerius | | | 695 | | |
| Aldetrude | | County of Hainaut | 696 | Maubeuge | Some sources say died 526 |
| Bercharius | | | 696 | | |
| Clodulf (Cloud, Clou) | 605 | | 696 | | Bishop of Metz |
| Eochod | | | 697 | | |
| Moling (Dairchilla, Molignus, Moling, Mulling, Myllin) | | | 697 | | Bishop of Ferns |
| Bertinus (Bertin, Bertuin) | | | 698 | | |
| Eadberht of Lindisfarne (Edbert) | | | 698 | | |
| Regulus (Reol) | | | 698 | | |
| Trudo (Tron, Trond) | | | 698 | | |
| Claudius of Besançon | | | 699 | | Bishop of Besançon |
| Æthelwold | | | 699 | | hermit |
| Sexburga | | | 699 | | |
| Agricolus (Agricola) | | | 700 | | Bishop of Avignon |
| Alnoth | | | 700 | | |
| Amarand | | | 700 | | Bishop of Albi |
| Anastasius the Sinaite | | | 700 | | |
| Cuaran (Curvinus, Cronan) | | | 700 | | |
| Desiderius of Fontenelle | | | 700 | | |
| Deusdedit | | | 700 | | Bishop of Brescia |
| Disibod (Disen, Disibode) | | | 700 | | |
| Drithelm | | | 700 | | |
| Eanfleda | | | 700 | | |
| Efflam | | | 700 | | |
| Everild | | | 700 | | |
| Godeberta | | | 700 | | |
| Lambert | 633 | | 700 | | Bishop of Maestricht |
| Maurontus (Mauruntius or Maurontius) | | | 700 | | |
| Medericus (Merry) | | | 700 | | |
| Mildred | | | 700 | | |
| Osmanna (Osanna) | | | 700 | | |
| Osyth | | | 700 | | |
| Pamphilus | | | 700 | | Bishop of Sulmona |
| Ranulphus (Ragnulf) | | | 700 | | |
| Reineldis (Raineldis, Reinildis) | | | 700 | | |
| Thordgith (Tortgyth, Theoregitha) | | | 700 | | |
| Vulmar (Wulmar, Ulmar, Vilmer) | | | 700 | | |

== See also ==
- Christianity in the 7th century
