= December 25 (Eastern Orthodox liturgics) =

Day in the Eastern Orthodox liturgical calendar

Eastern Orthodox liturgical calendar
December 24	December 25	December 26
December 25 O.S. ≍ January 7 N.S. December 25 N.S ≍ December 12 O.S.

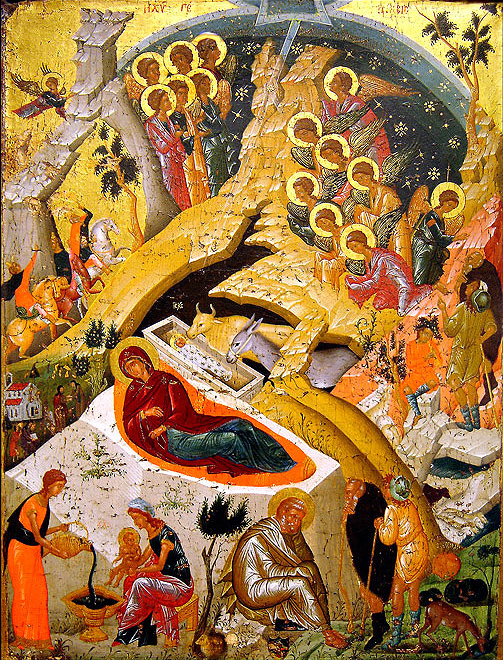
Byzantine icon of Nativity of Christ. (Byzantine & Christian Museum, Athens).

December 25 in Eastern Orthodox liturgical calendars is a feast day and a day of commemoration of saints and martyrs. Although some Orthodox churches use the Revised Julian Calendar and others use the traditional Julian calendar, the fixed commemorations for their respective December 25 are broadly the same, no matter which calendar is used. (Note: Despite the dates being the same, the days to which they refer typically differ by 13 days. The notation Old Style or O.S. is sometimes used to indicate a date in the traditional Julian Calendar (the "Old Calendar"). The notation New Style or N.S. indicates a date in the Revised Julian calendar (the "New Calendar").)

== Feasts ==
- The Nativity, according to the Flesh of our Lord, God, and Savior Jesus Christ. (Note: The traditional Orthodox greeting, used from today until the Eve of Theophany, is: "Christ is Born!" And the response is, "Glorify Him!") (Note: "IN the year, from the creation of the world, when in the beginning God created heaven and earth, five, thousand, one hundred and ninety-nine (5199 BC); from the flood, two thousand, nine hundred and fifty-seven (2957 BC); from the birth of Abraham, two thousand and fifteen (2015 BC); from Moses and the coming of the Israelites out of Egypt, one thousand, five hundred and ten (1510 BC); from the anointing of King David, one thousand and thirty-two (1032 BC); in the sixty-fifth week, according to the prophecy of Daniel; in the one hundred and ninety-fourth Olympiad; in the year seven hundred and fifty-two from the founding of the city of Rome (752 BC); in the forty-second year of the empire of Octavian Augustus, when the whole earth was at peace, in the sixth age of the world, Jesus Christ, eternal God, and Son of the eternal Father, desirous to sanctify the world by His most merciful coming, having been conceived of the Holy Ghost, and nine months having elapsed since his conception, is born in Bethlehem of Juda, having become man of the Virgin Mary. THE NATIVITY OF OUR LORD JESUS CHRIST, ACCORDING TO THE FLESH.") (Note: "[Roman and all Western Martyrologies. Also the Eastern Menaeas. The Carthaginian Kalendar of the 5th cent., and the ancient Roman Kalendar of the middle of the 4th cent., published by Bucherius.]": "TILL the year 325 we have only uncertain traces of the observance of this festival; but in the middle of the fourth century, under Pope Liberius, we hear of it as generally observed in the Roman Church, and throughout the West. The celebration of the Feast of the Nativity spread from the West to the East, and S. John Chrysostom used his utmost endeavour to promote this introduction. Already, in 386, S. John Chrysostom says that the festival was observed in Antioch. The festival is ordered to be observed with reverence and dignity by the councils of Agde in 504 (can. 64), of Orleans in 511 (can. 24), and of Epaone in 517 (can. 35). Before this, the commemoration of the Nativity was united with that of the Epiphany, which is far the more ancient festival of the two... ... ...On December 25th the Greeks also commemorate the Adoration of the Magi.")
- The Adoration of the Magi: Melchior (Melichior), Caspar (Gaspar), and Balthazar (Balthasar).
- Commemoration of the shepherds in Bethlehem who were watching their flocks and came to see the Lord:
  - Annunciation to the shepherds; and Adoration of the shepherds.

== Pre-Schism Western saints ==
- Saint Eugenia of Rome (c. 258) (Note: A virgin-martyr in Rome under Valerian, she was buried in the cemetery of Apronian on the Via Latina.) (see also December 24 - East)
- Saint Anastasia of Sirmium (c. 304) (Note: According to her Life, she suffered in Sirmium in Dalmatia, her relics were taken to Constantinople and veneration spread to Rome, where a basilica is dedicated to her.) (see also December 22 - East)
- Saint Adalsindis, a nun, first at Marchiennes Abbey, later entering the nearby convent of Hamay-les-Marchiennes, near Arras in France (c. 715) (Note: One of the daughters of Sts Adalbard (or Adalbald) and Rictrudis, she became a nun at Marchiennes Abbey with her widowed mother who was abbess there, before entering Hamay-les-Marchiennes Abbey near Arras, France, where her own sister St. Eusebia had succeeded their great-grandmother, St. Gertrude of Hamage as abbess.)
- Saint Æthelburh of Wilton (Alburgh, Alburga), a member of the royal house of Wessex, Abbess of Wilton Abbey (810) (Note: Sister of St. Egbert of Wessex in England and wife of Wulstan of Wiltshire, she founded a convent in Wilton near Salisbury, where she became a nun in her widowhood.)

== Post-Schism Orthodox saints ==
- Repose of Saint Hieronymus of Simonopetra Monastery, Mount Athos (1957) (Note: See: (in Greek) Όσιος Ιερώνυμος Σιμωνοπετρίτης ο Μικρασιάτης. Βικιπαίδεια. (Greek Wikipedia).) (see also: April 26-O.S. / May 9-N.S. -- feast day)

=== New martyrs and confessors ===
- Massacre of New Hieromartyr Jonah, Hieromonk of St. Tryphon of Pechenga Monastery, (Note: See: (in Russian) Иона Печенгский. Википедии. (Russian Wikipedia).) and with him 50 monks and 65 laymen, by the Swedes (1589) (Note: This raid was carried out by a Finnish peasant chief named Pekka Antinpoika Vesainen, on December 25, 1589, and was part of the Russo-Swedish War (1590–1595).) (see also: December 15)
- New Hieromartyr Leonid Serebrennikov, Priest (1918)
- New Hieromartyr Michael, Priest (1930)

== Other commemorations ==
- Commemoration of the Deliverance of the Russian Church and Empire from the invasion of the French and twelve other nations (1812)

== Icon gallery ==
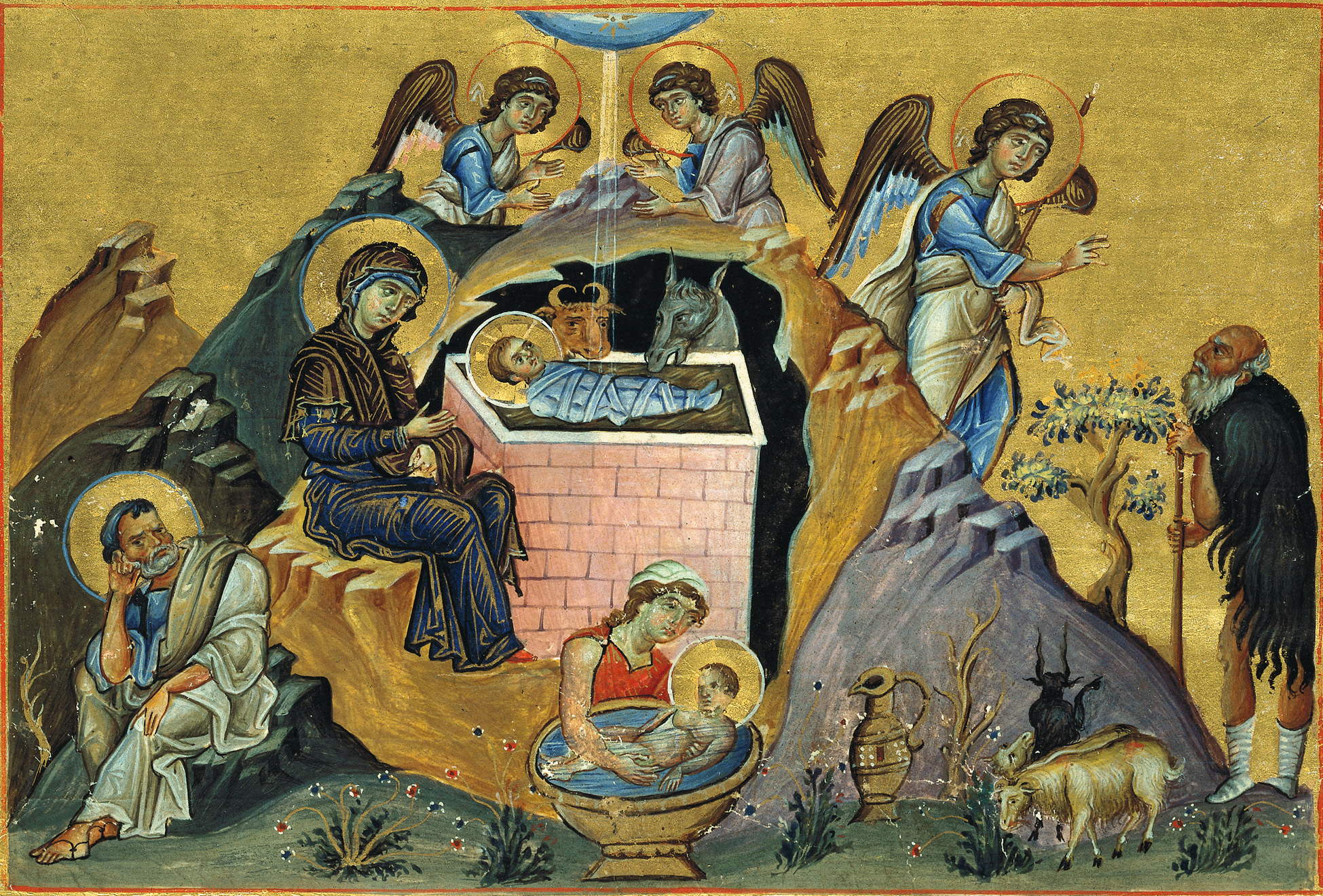
The Nativity.
(Menologion of Basil II, 10th century).

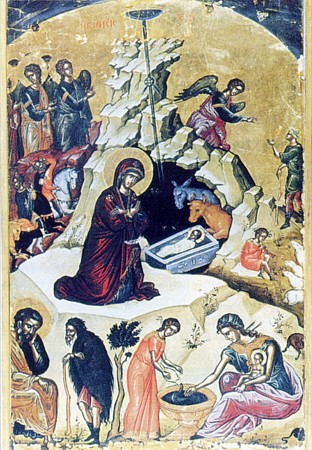
The Nativity.
(16th century).

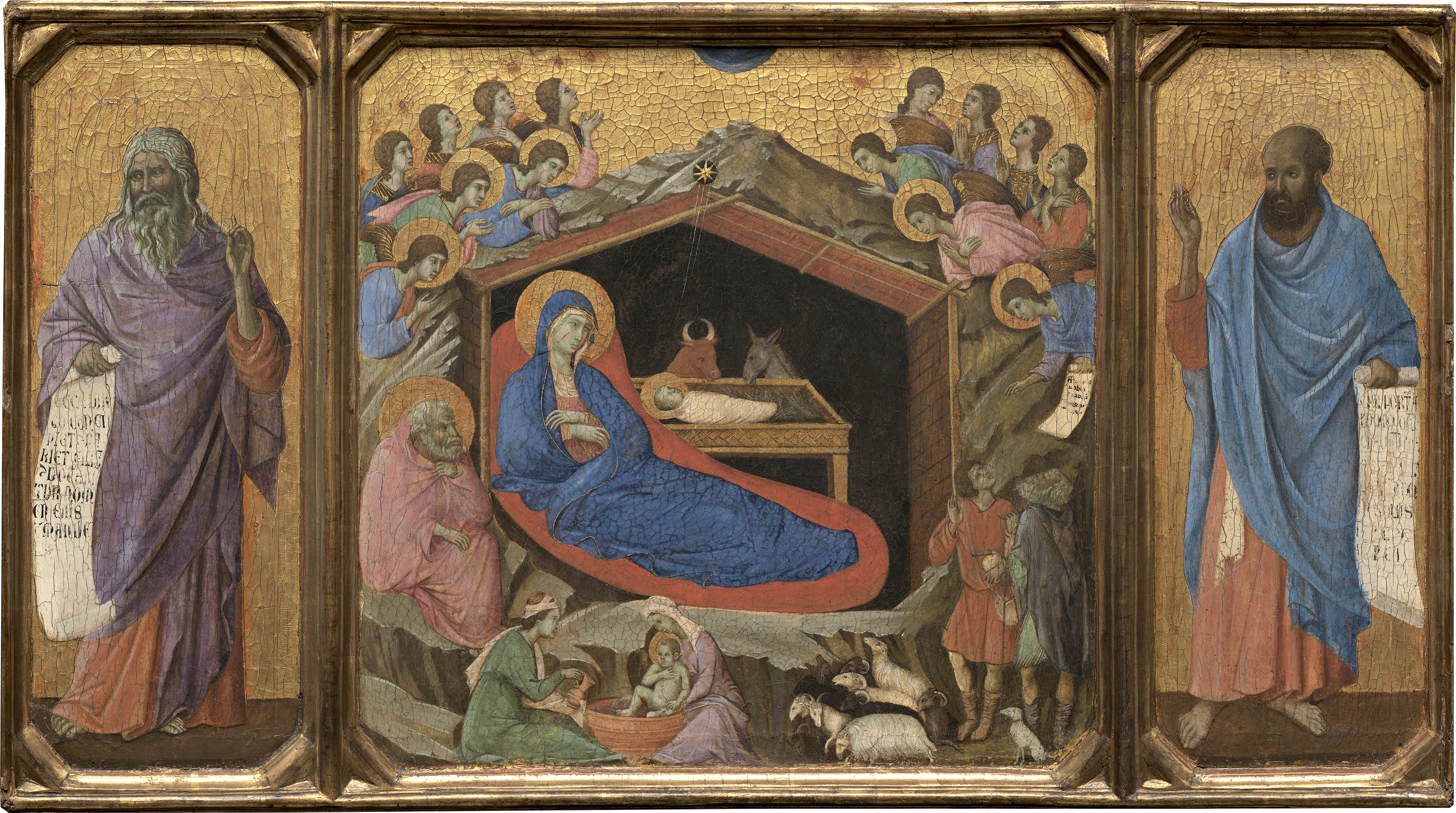
The Nativity, with the Prophets Isaiah and Ezekiel.
(Duccio, c. 1308-1311).

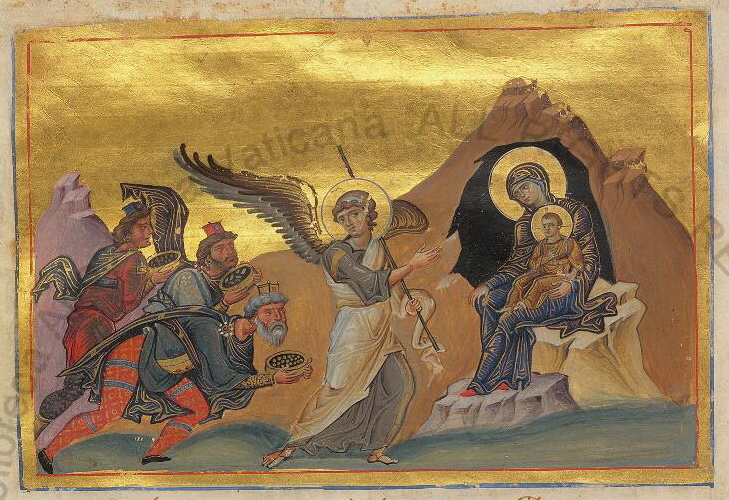
The Adoration of the Magi.
(Menologion of Basil II, 10th century).

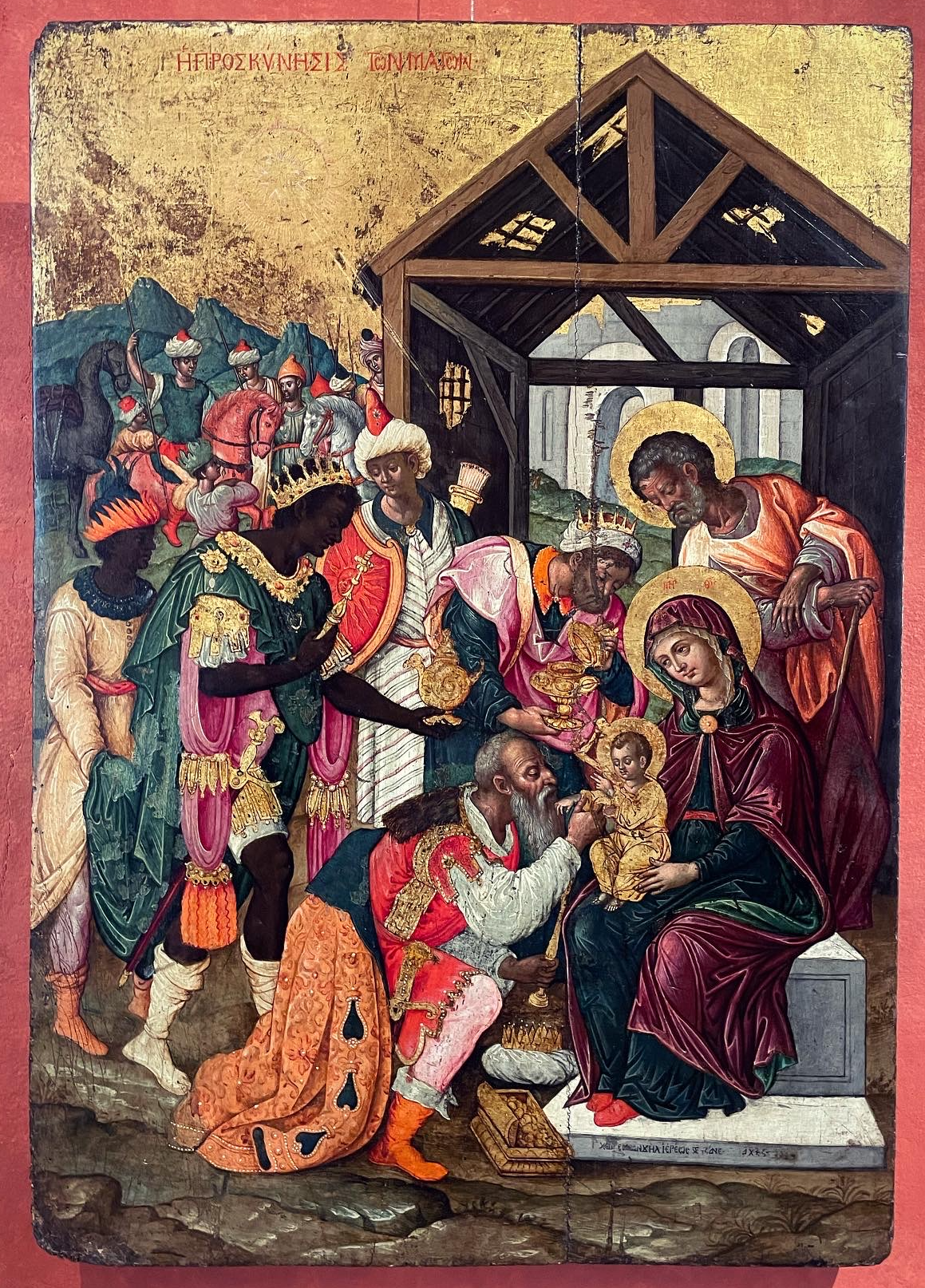
The Adoration of the Magi.
(Byzantine & Christian Museum, Athens).

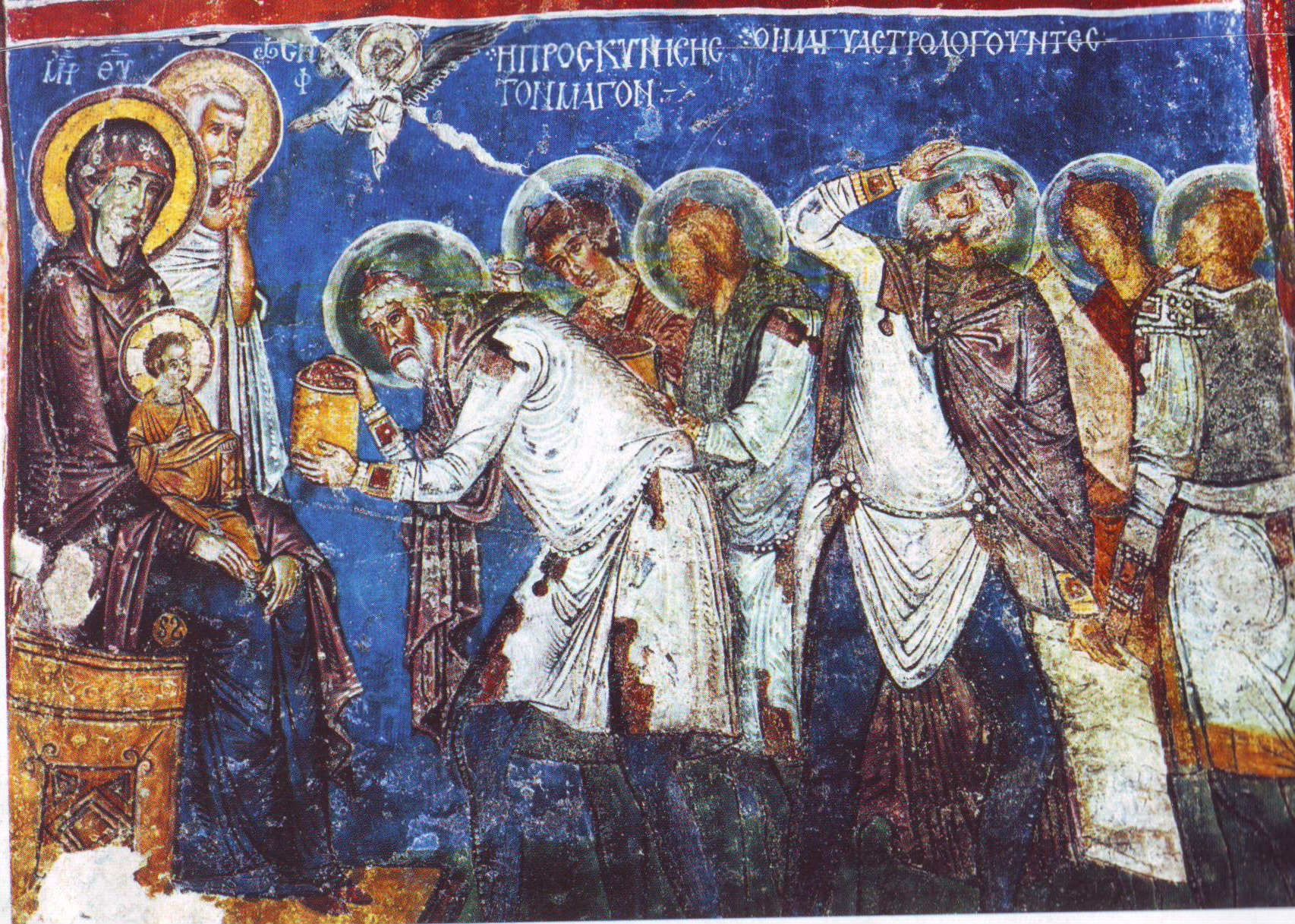
The Adoration of the Magi.
(Fresco in Cappadocia, 12th century)

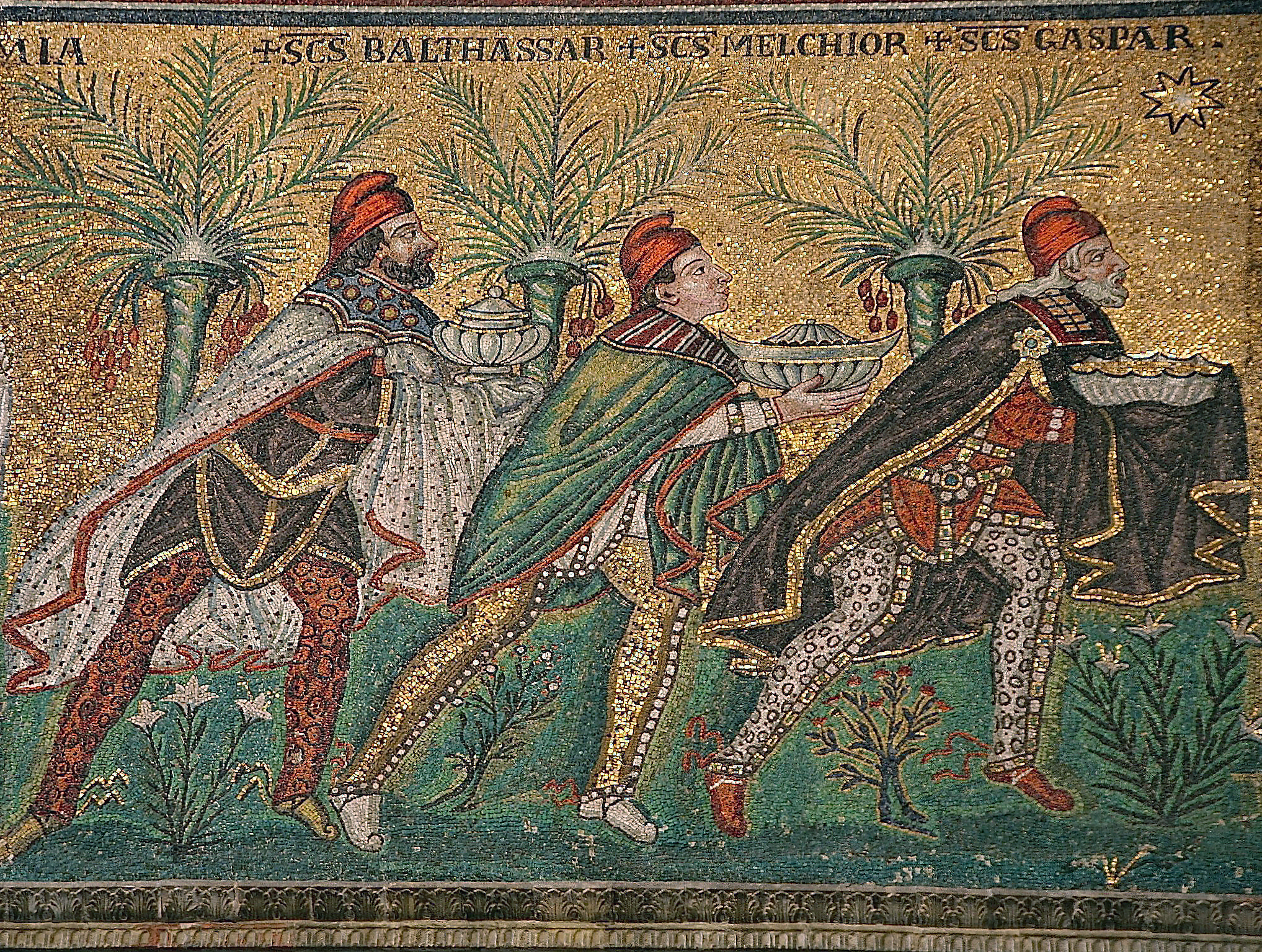
The Three Wise Men", Balthasar, Melchior, and Gaspar.
(Basilica of Sant'Apollinare Nuovo in Ravenna, Italy, c. 526 AD).

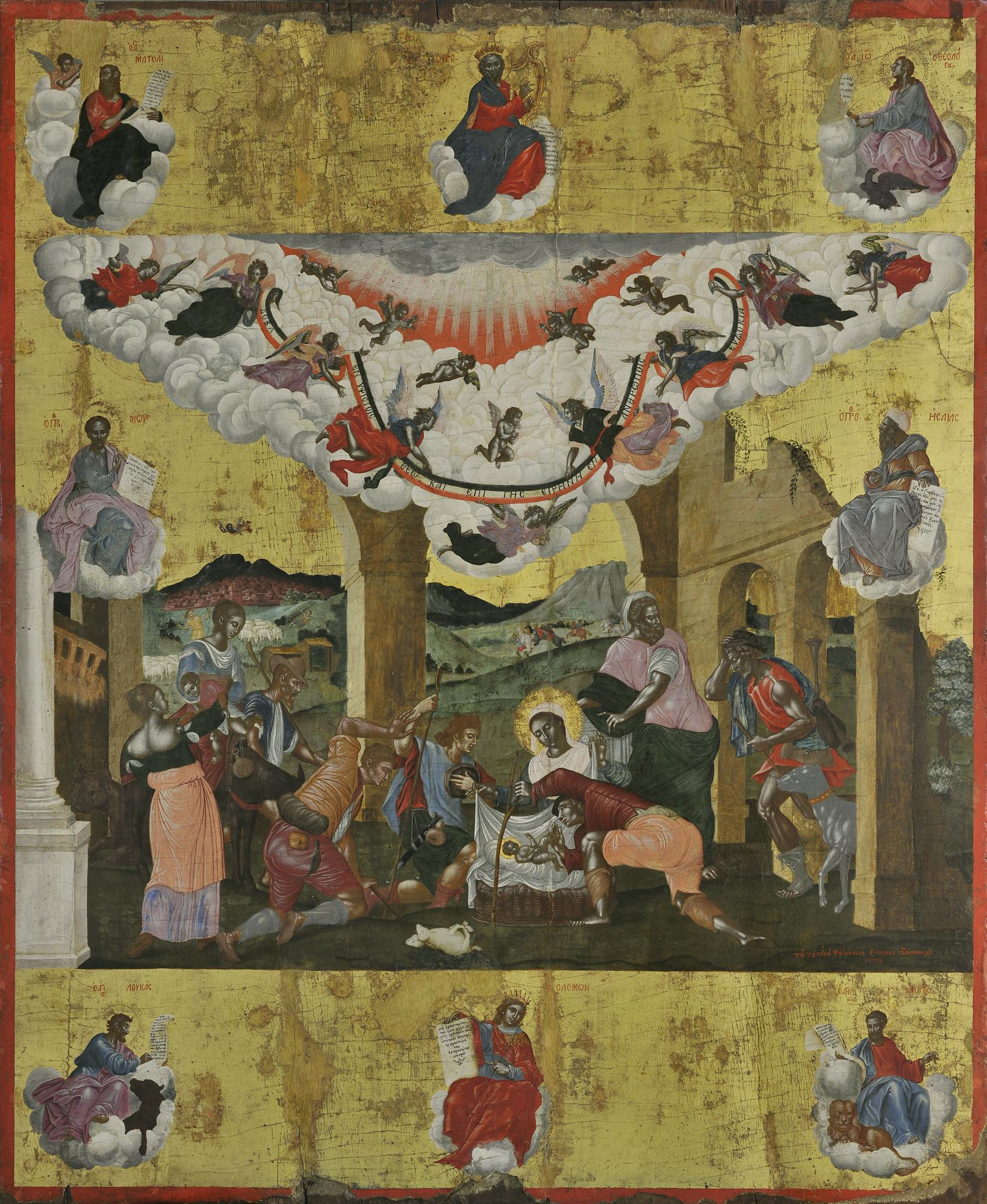
The Adoration of the Shepherds.

== Sources ==
- December 25/January 7. Orthodox Calendar (PRAVOSLAVIE.RU).
- January 7 / December 25. HOLY TRINITY RUSSIAN ORTHODOX CHURCH (A parish of the Patriarchate of Moscow).
- December 25. OCA - The Lives of the Saints.
- The Autonomous Orthodox Metropolia of Western Europe and the Americas (ROCOR). St. Hilarion Calendar of Saints for the year of our Lord 2004. St. Hilarion Press (Austin, TX). p. 2.
- December 25. Latin Saints of the Orthodox Patriarchate of Rome.
- The Roman Martyrology. Transl. by the Archbishop of Baltimore. Last Edition, According to the Copy Printed at Rome in 1914. Revised Edition, with the Imprimatur of His Eminence Cardinal Gibbons. Baltimore: John Murphy Company, 1916. pp. 395–397.

Greek Sources

- Great Synaxaristes: (in Greek) 25 ΔΕΚΕΜΒΡΙΟΥ. ΜΕΓΑΣ ΣΥΝΑΞΑΡΙΣΤΗΣ.
- (in Greek) Συναξαριστής. 25 Δεκεμβρίου. ECCLESIA.GR. (H ΕΚΚΛΗΣΙΑ ΤΗΣ ΕΛΛΑΔΟΣ).

Russian Sources

- (in Russian) 7 января (25 декабря). Православная Энциклопедия под редакцией Патриарха Московского и всея Руси Кирилла (электронная версия). (Orthodox Encyclopedia - Pravenc.ru).
- (in Russian) 25 декабря (ст.ст.) 7 января 2015 (нов. ст.). Русская Православная Церковь Отдел внешних церковных связей. (DECR).
