= Jonath =

Jonath is both a given name and surname. Notable people with the name include:

- Jonatus (died c. 690), abbot
- Arthur Jonath (1909–1963), German sprinter
- Johnath Marlone Azevedo da Silva (born 1992), Brazilian footballer
