= Maurontius of Douai =

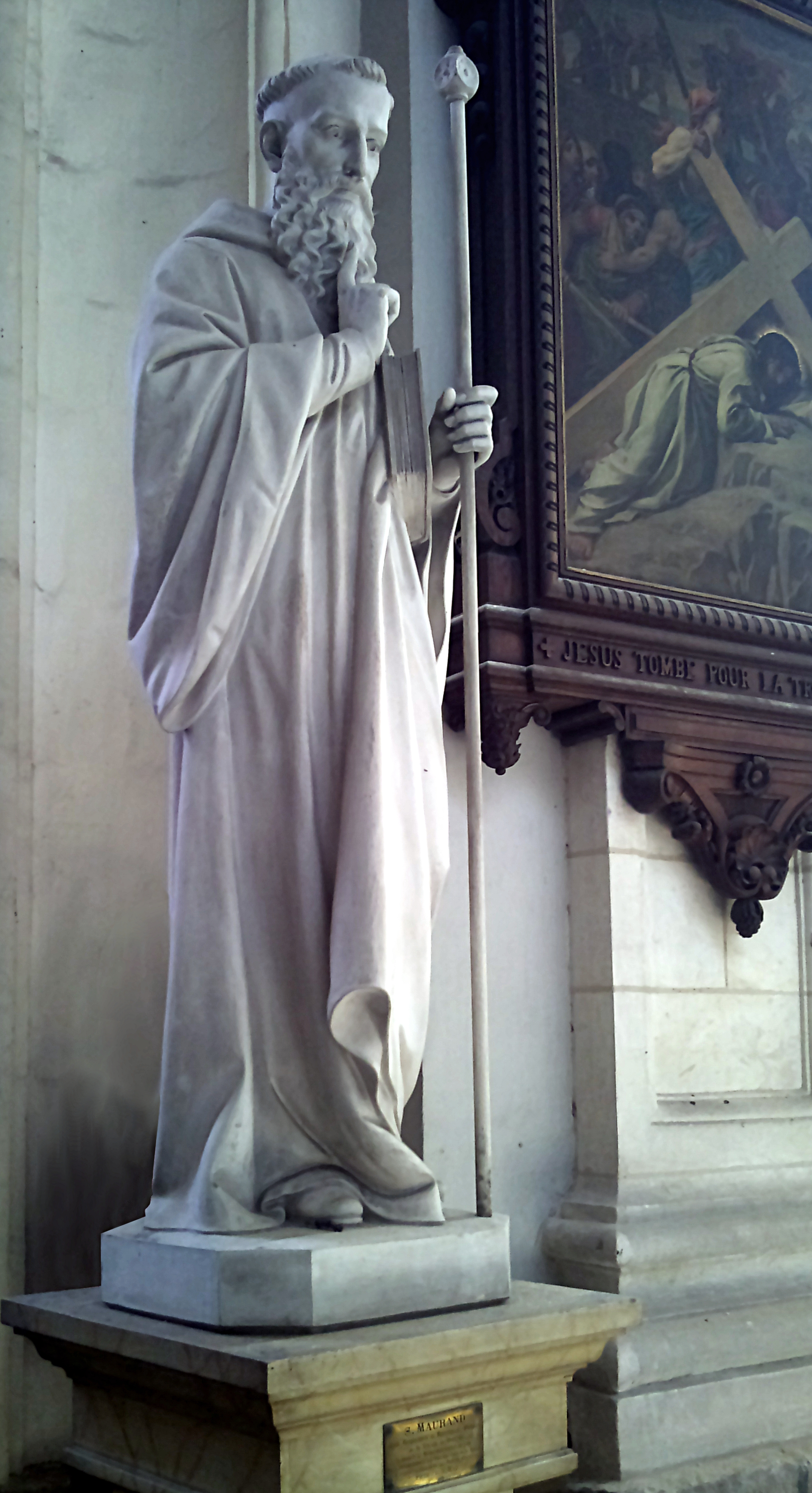

Also written as Maurontus, Mauruntius, Maurantius, Mauront, Mauron, and Maurant.
- Born: 634
- Died: May 5, 702
- Feast: May 5

Maurontius of Douai (634 – May 5, 702) was a nobleman and Benedictine abbot. His parents were Rictrude and Adalbard. He is a Catholic saint, with a feast day on May 5, especially venerated in Douai, France. His sisters Clotsinda, Adalsinda of Douai and Eusebia are also saints.

== Life ==
Born in 634, he was baptized by the hermit-monk, Richarius, a friend of the family. As the eldest son of Adalbald of Ostrevent, he passed his youth in the court of King Clovis II. Upon the death of his father in 652, Maurontius became lord of Douai, and succeeded to other large estates. He came home into Flanders to settle his concerns and to marry a rich young lady, a treaty having been already concluded for this purpose. However, a sermon of Amandus, abbot of Elnon Abbey on the vanity and dangers of the world, caused him to reconsider.

He entered Marchiennes Abbey, which had been founded by his parents, and received the tonsure from Abbot Amandus. After some years, he was made deacon and prior of Hamage, half a league from Marchiennes, on the Scarp, founded by a relative, Gertrude of Hamage. He built himself a new monastery called Breüil, on his estate of Merville, a considerable town near Saint-Venant, in the diocess of Thérouanne, and when it was finished, was chosen the first abbot.

His father Adalbald had two brothers, Sigefrid, count of Ponthieu, and Archenald, Mayor of the Palace to Clovis II, son of Dagobert, to whom they were related. After the death of Adalbald, his brother Archenald rebuilt the castle of Douay, (which gave rise to the town,) and founded the church of our Lady, now called Saint Amatus’s.

Amandus, on being banished by King Theodoric III. was committed to the care of Mauront, who so much respected Amandus that he resigned to him his abbacy, and lived under his obedience, but was obliged to resume his charge upon the death of that holy bishop, in 690. He was also abbot of the monks at Marchiennes, while his sister Clotsinda was abbess of the separate house of nuns, this being at that time a double monastery. Saint Mauront died there in the seventy-second year of his age, on 5 May 702.

Merville, the ancient Minariacum of Antoninus, having been plundered by the Danes or Normans, towards the end of the ninth century, Charles the Simple, king of France, transferred the community of monks from Breüil to our Lady’s Church at Douai, which had been founded by Archenald, Mauront’s uncle. At the same time the body of Mauront with that of Saint Amandus, was translated from Breüil to Douay, and both are there enshrined in the church of Saint Amatus, which, since the secularization of the monastery in 940, is a collegiate church of canons. Mauront is styled sometimes Deacon, and sometimes Abbot: by which he seems never to have been ordained priest. His body was kept in a rich shrine in this church, in which there was a chapel, where his statue is seen between those of his parents.

He is represented holding in his right hand a sceptre, and in his left a building with a tower or belfry. The abbey of Saint Guislin in Hainault possesses his skull in a shrine of silver gilt. The cathedral of Arras and some other churches, show particles of his relics.

== Sources ==
Information regarding Maurontius is derived from the Vita Rictrudis, commissioned by Marchiennes Abbey, and written in 907 by Hucbald. Karine Ugé suggests that the identification of Maurontius as a son of Rictrude is due to an inadvertent conflation with an individual of the same name mentioned in Alcuin's Vita Richarii confessoris Centulensis, where a woman by the name of "Rictrude" is also mentioned, although not necessarily his mother.

== See also ==
- Chronological list of saints in the 8th century
