= Eusebia of Hamage =

Frankish saint, abbess (637–660)

Eusebia (in French: Eusébie) (637 – 660), was a Frankish abbess of Hamage (now called Wandignies-Hamage) and is venerated as a saint whose feast day is 16 March. Versions of her name include Eusoye or Ysoie, which was the name of a village in the diocese of Beauvais, France.

== Biography ==
Eusebia was the great-granddaughter of Saint Gertrude (abbess at the abbey of Wandignies-Hamage, to whom she was entrusted), and the oldest child of Saint Adalbald I of Ostrevent and Saint Rictrude of Marchiennes, of Vascon nobility and lords in the Netherlands. Her three siblings are also venerated as saints: Saint Adalsinde, Saint Maurontius of Douai and Saint Clodoswinthe.

Eusebia was born in the year 637, at the end of the reign of Dagobert I, two years before Saint Amand of Maastricht, who was bishop of Maastricht, had laid the foundations of the abbey of Marchiennes. She was presented for baptism by Nanthild, the Queen of the Franks who was her godmother and gave her "the fine estate of Verny, in the neighborhood of Soissons."

When she was eight, Eusebia's father was murdered by Rictrude's brothers in Vasconia and Eusebia was left with her mother and two sisters in Hamage. There, she was adopted and trained by Saint Gertrude (first abbess at Hamage), the grandmother of her father Adalbald.

In 649, when her great-grandmother died, Eusebia replaced her as titular abbess at the age of 12 but a conflict arose between Eusebia and her mother, Rictrude, who wanted to give her further training before she became abbess. When Eusebia rejected the idea of leaving Hamage, her mother had to obtain a letter (lettre de cachet) from King Clovis II to force Eusebia to go to Rictrude's abbey Marchiennes and live under the strict authority of her mother for one year. During that time, Eusébie longed to live at her Abby in Hamage and would go there furtively during the night to sing her prayers. When Rictrude discovered the girl's deception, she had Eusebia beaten by her brother Maurontius until she almost died. Still rebellious, Eusebia was allowed to return to her abbey in Hamage when she turned 13. She instructed her community of nuns and followers more by her example and less by speeches, imposing abstinence and purity on herself until her death at the age of 33. Some sources give her age at death as 23 or 27, and others as 49, but the Catholic Church has concluded that she died at 33 after 20 years as abbess.

== Veneration ==
Eusebia's body was buried in her church but due to her popular following the building quickly became too small. Many miracles are said to have occurred at her tomb. Therefore, Gertude the new abbess who had succeeded Eusebia built a new and larger church that was dedicated to the Holy Virgin by Saint Vindicianus, Bishop of Arras and Cambrai. On the day of the church's consecration, the relics of Saint Eusebia were moved there. Later, the two monasteries were burned by invading Normans. Attempts were made to rebuild them under the reign of the King of the Franks Charles the Simple at the beginning of the 10th century but poverty was so great at the time in the area that the gold and silver from the shrine were sold to feed the nuns. The relics of Saint Eusebia remained for 200 years in a simple wooden coffin until 1133 when a new shrine of gold and silver was built. The saint's remains were transferred there on 17 May 1133.

In 1537, one of the saint's ribs, as well as a hand bone of Saint Rictude were removed and transported to Douai to be preserved in the collegiate church of Saint Pierre. According to one source, "The main virtues recognized in Eusebia are prudence in deeds and enterprises, justice and moderation in her decisions, and strength of mind and character."

According to many sources, Eusebia's feast day is celebrated on 16 March, sometimes 17 March.

== See also ==
Chronological list of saints in the 7th century
