= Vita Sanctae Rictrudis =

The Vita sanctae Rictrudis is a Latin biography and hagiography of Saint Rictrude of Marchiennes (b. c. 612 – c. 614; d. c. 676 – c. 691), the abbess of Marchiennes Abbey, in Flanders. It was commissioned by the abbey and written in 907 by Hucbald, a Benedictine monk and music theorist. It draws on earlier sources, some of which have vanished. Hucbald was asked by the clerks and nuns of the Marchiennes Abbey to write the Vita because they had lost track of its patron saints' shrines and documents about its founding. The Vita's purpose was to tell Rictrude's life story, to provide a historical context for her story, to create the abbey's origin story for its community, and to help revitalize the community. There are several "dubious elements" of the Vita, mostly having to do with Rictrude's family and children.

== Content and analysis ==
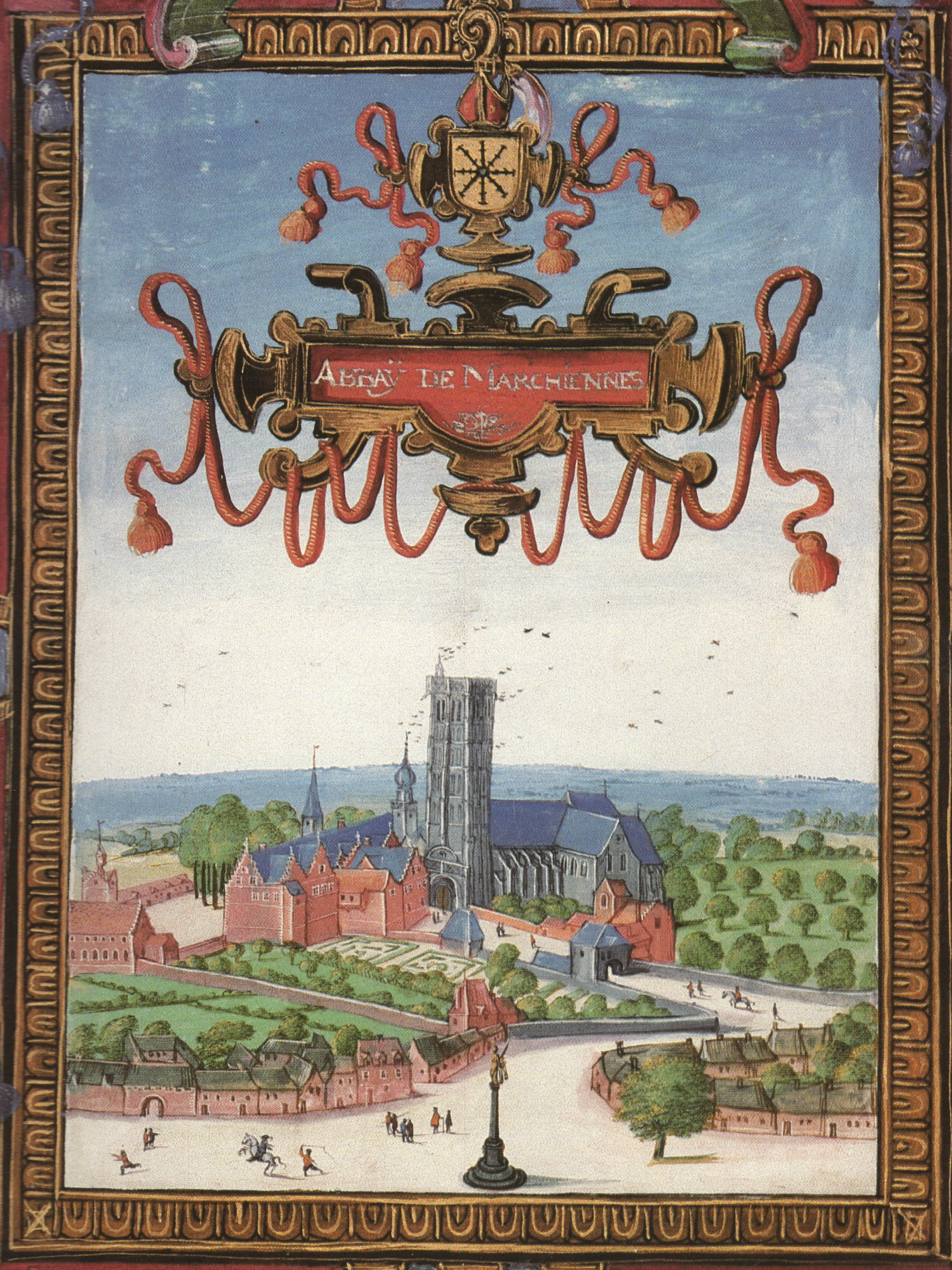
Marchiennes Abbey, in Flanders.

The Vita sanctae Rictrudis is a Latin biography and hagiography of Rictrude of Marchiennes (b. c. 612 – c. 614; d. c. 676 – c. 691), the saint and abbess of Marchiennes Abbey, in Flanders. It was commissioned by the abbey, and written in 907 by Hucbald, a Benedictine monk and music theorist who resided at Saint-Armand Abbey.

The Vita draws on earlier sources, some of which have since vanished, including the Vita Arnulfi, a hagiography of Arnulf of Metz, the 7th-century Frankish saint and bishop. Hucbald might also have used another hagiography, the Vita Richarii, about St. Richarius, written by Alcuin, the 8th-century English scholar, clergyman, poet, and teacher. Hucbald was asked by the clerks and nuns of the Marchiennes Abbey to write Rictrude's Vita because they had lost track of its patron saints' shrines and documents about its founding. All documents about Rictrude's life and the abbey's founding were destroyed during Viking attacks around 881. The attacks also might have resulted in Marchiennes' decline in importance and authority. Scholar Karine Uge states that the Vita's purpose was to not only tell Rictrude's story, but to provide a historical context for her life and to create the abbey's origin story for its community. Hucbald also wanted to show Rictrude's spiritual and social distinction and to help revitalize the community. The abbey is the Vita's central locus. Hucbald dedicates the Vita to Stephen, Bishop of Liéges. It remains the only written account of Marchiennes Abbey.

Hucbald was resistant about writing Rictrude's Vita at first because he thought he did not know enough about the subject, but a long time had passed since her death, and he had not seen any "trustworthy narrative in writing". He was worried falsehoods would prevail, so he agreed. Uge states that Hucbald was also worried about his characters' sanctity, so the text is interspersed with sermons and edifications to his readers. Uge states that Hucbald was "not only a good writer but also a good theologian". Uge reports that Hucbald depended on oral tradition from the nuns residing at Marchiennes at the time and what she calls "a good deal of imaginative memory". She also states that the Vita cannot be compared to other contemporary sources, so what Hucbald chose to include and not to include can only be inferred from its text. Uge states that his sources appear "very fragmentary, perhaps even doubtful", but eventually the residents of Marchiennes were able to find fragments of documents that survived, which Hucbald then used, after he verified that they matched the testimony of sworn witnesses who had seen the originals.

Uge describes many of what she calls "dubious elements" of the Vita, which she says can be identified by his narrative technique. For example, one of the literary devices he uses is his insistence that Rictrude's children were baptised by well-known figures of the time, which Uge says "does not reflect reality". She considers what she calls "overt name-dropping" suspicious and discounts their veracity. She finds it more interesting that they were recorded at all, adding that the details Hucbald added to the baptisms were meant to emphasize the Vita's historicity, and to provide its characters to emphasize that Rictrude's children were meant for "the highest destiny". There is nothing in the Vita about the baptism of her youngest child, Adalsind, who died before her mother and "did not have a particularly holy fate".

Three chapters of Rictrude's Vita concern the life and deeds of her son, Maurontus. It describes a visit by Richarius, who became Maurontus' mentor. Richarius and Maurontius were attacked by a demon-possessed horse, but the priest protected Maurontus, and Maurontus was unharmed. Richarius' Vita had a recounting of a similar story. Later, when Maurontus became an adult, he contracted a marriage, but after being influenced by Saint Arnulf, he changed his mind and, like his mother, chose to enter the religious life. He went to Marchiennes to explain his decision to Rictrude, and as he stood next to Armand while Armand was celebrating Mass, a bee circled around Maurontus' head three times. Hicbald interpreted the incident as a sign from God; Armand consecrated Maurontus as a deacon and tonsured him. After his consecration, Maurontus founded Saint-Armand Abbey. Uge considers Maurontus' story "a blatant creation".

The Vita also recounts a story about one of Rictrude's daughters, Eusebia, who was appointed, at the age of 12, to succeed her great-grandmother, Gertrude, as abbess of the abbey of Wandignies-Hamage; Gertrude had also founded the abbey and raised Eustabia. Rictrude felt that Eusebia was too young, so she ordered her back to Marchiennes for more training. Eusebia sneaked back to Hamage each night to pray, but when Rictrude discovered it, she had her beaten by her brother, Maurontus. Eventually, Rictrude allowed Eusebia to settle permanently in Harnage, and she became its abbess, but Eusebia never fully recovered from the ordeal.

== Works cited ==
- McNamara, Jo Ann; Halborg, John E.; Whatley, E. Gordon (1996). "Rictrude, Abbess of Marchiennes". In McNamara, Jo Ann; Halborg, John E.; Whatley, E. Gordon (eds.). Sainted Women of the Dark Ages. Duke University Press. pp. 195–219. ISBN 0-8223-1200-X.
- Uge, Karine (2005). Creating the Monastic Past in Medieval Flanders. Woodbridge, U.K.: York Medieval Press. ISBN 1-903153-16-6.
