= Vulmar =

French abbot later canonised

Saint Vulmar
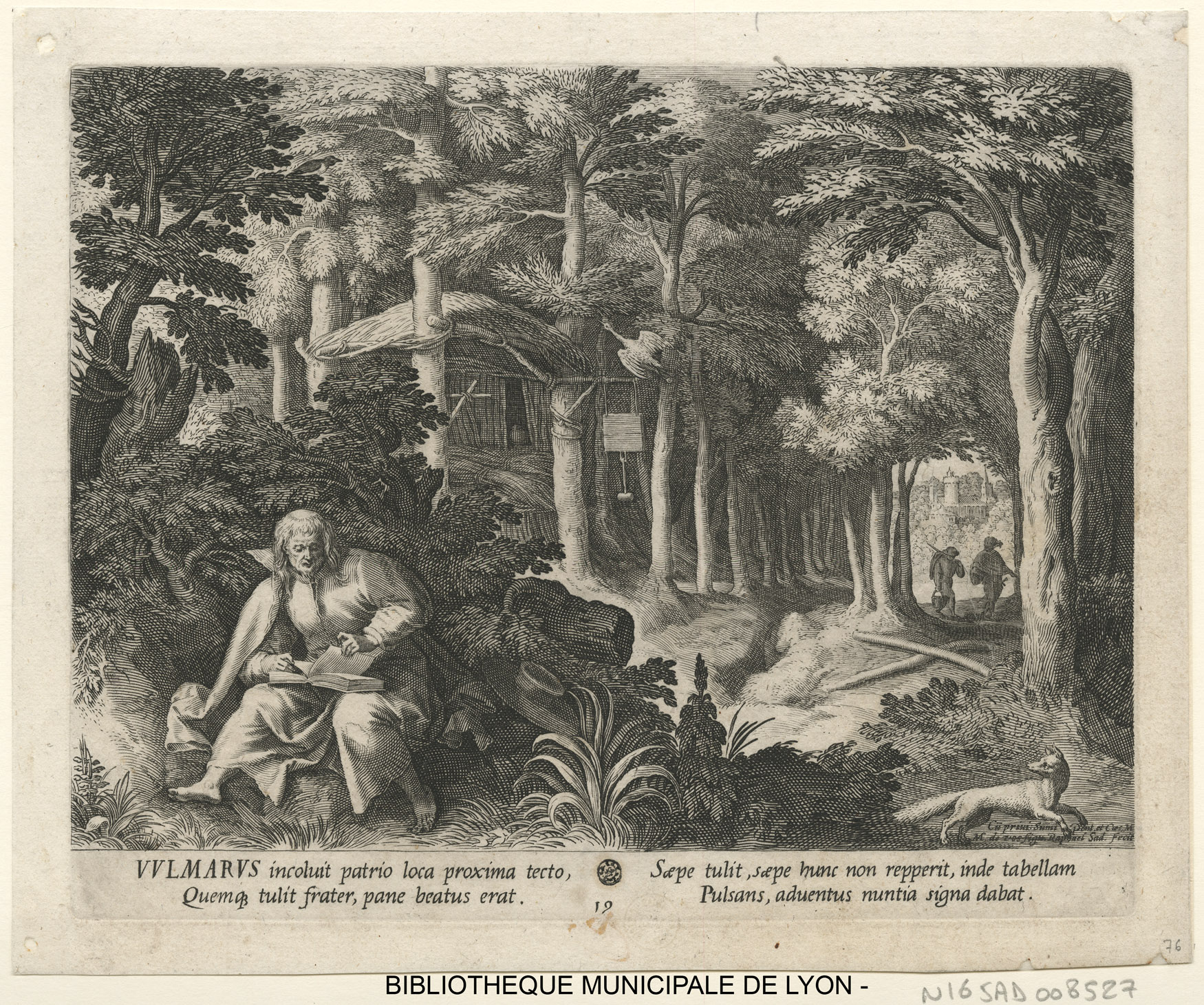
- Vulmarus (1600) Bibliotheque municipale de Lyon
- Born: Boulogne
- Died: 7th century
- Feast: 20 July

Saint Vulmar (or Ulmar, Vilmer, Vulmaire, Vulmar of Samer, Vulmarus, Wulmar; died 689) was a French priest, hermit and then abbot who was later venerated as a saint. He turned to religion after his wife was taken from him and given to the man to whom she had previously been betrothed.

== Life ==
Vulmar was born near Boulogne in Picardy, France. He married, but was separated from his wife. He became a lay brother at the Benedictine Hautmont Abbey, formerly in Hainaut. Later he became a priest and was the founding abbot of Samer monastery near Boulogne. It is said that Vulmar hid in a hollow oak at Caëstre for three days to avoid unwelcome honors. He is depicted as a hermit living in a hollow tree who receives bread from a peasant. His feast day is 20 July.

== Butler's account ==
According to the hagiographer Alban Butler,

ST VULMAR. Abbot (c. A.D. 700) ST Vulmar or Wulmar, whom the Roman Martyrology calls a man of wonderful holiness, was born in the territory of Boulogne in Picardy. He was married, but having been separated by force from his wife, he entered himself in the abbey of Hautmont in Hainault, where he was employed to keep the cattle and to hew wood for the community. He was distinguished for his eminent spirit of prayer, and was promoted to the priesthood. He after obtained leave to live alone in a hermitage near Mount Cassel for some years, and then founded near Calais the abbey of Samer, corruptly so called for Saint-Vulmar; this monastery existed until the French Revolution. St Vulmar also founded a nunnery at Wierre-aux-Bois, a mile from his own monastery. Caedwalla, King of the West Saxons, passing that way in 688 on his journey to receive baptism, conferred on the abbey an alms towards carrying on the foundation. St Vulmar was glorified by miracles, and his relics were conveyed to Boulogne, and from thence to the abbey of St Peter at Ghent.

== Baring-Gould's account ==
According to Sabine Baring-Gould, Vulmar was the son of a Frankish nobleman named Vulbert. When he was a young man he was married to a girl named Osterhilda. However, when she was a child she had been promised by her parents to someone else. That person complained to the king of the Franks, who ordered the separation of the young couple and gave Osterhilda to the person to whom shed had been betrothed. Vulmar reacted by turning his back on the world and joining the monastery of Hautont in Hainault. He was given the job of looking after cows.

Eventually Vulmar was ordained a priest, but decided to live alone in the oak forest. For many years he lived in the Eeken forest, but when he was discovered returned to his place of birth and built a hermitage in the forest near Samer. Over time both male and female disciples joined him, and he built two monasteries in the forest, one for men that he led and one for women under his niece Eremberta. In 688 Ceadwalla, king of the West Saxons, visited him there while travelling to Rome, gave him 30 sous and said he would pray for him. Vulmar died of old age just before or after the start of the 8th century and was buried at Samer. The Huguenots later scattered his bones.

== Sources ==
- Baring-Gould, Sabine (1882), The Lives of the Saints, J. Hodges
- Butler, Alban (1956), Thurston, Herbert; Attwater, Donald (eds.), Butler's Lives of the Saints, vol. III July August September, Westminster, Maryland: Christian Classics Inc., ISBN 0870610481
- Drake, Maurice; Drake, Wilfred (1916-01-01), Saints and their emblems, Dalcassian Publishing Company, GGKEY:PR7E6H0KXDH
- Humanistica Lovaniensia, vol. 11 History Of The Foundation And The Rise Of The Collegium Trilingue Lovaniense 1517-1550: Part The Second : The Development, Leuven University Press, 1953, pp. 387–515
- St Vulmar, British Museum
