= Adalsinda of Hamage =

7th-century Columban nun

Saint Adalisinda
- Venerated in: Catholic Church
- Canonized: Pre-congregation
- Feast: 25 December

Adalsinda or Adalsindis of Hamay (or Hamage) was a 7th-century Columban nun from a prominent Merovingian family. She is venerated as a saint in the Catholic Church. Her feast day is 25 December, around the date of her death, traditionally said to have occurred "during the solemnities of Christmas".

Adalsinda's parents were Richtrudis, a Gascoigne-Basque heiress, and Adalbard I of Ostrevent, a Frankish duke of Douai. Her older sister, Eusebia of Hamage (a.k.a. Eusebia of Douai) became an abbess who was venerated as a saint after her death in 660. Both mother and father are also recognised as saints, as are another sister, Clotsinda, and a brother, Maurontius. They are especially venerated in Northern France and Flanders.

== Life ==
Saint Adalsinda (Note: Also: Adalsende, Adalasinda, Adalisinda, or Adalsindis) (French: Adalsinde), the youngest child of the family, entered Marchiennes Abbey in c. 653, with her mother and sisters. Later she went to the Abbaye d'Hamage (alternatively known as 'Hamay' or 'Hamay-sur-la-Scarpe'), where her sister Eusebia had become abbess in succession to their great-grandmother, Saint Gertrude. Gertrudes's widowed daughter, Gerberta – who was Adalbard's mother, and so the sisters' grandmother – was also a nun of Hamay Abbey. Clotsinda remained at Marchiennes, with her mother.

Adalsinda's year of death is uncertain; some histories recount that she predeceased her mother, who died in 688, either giving the year as c. 673 or stating that she died very young. For example, authors P. F. X. de Ram (1866) and Dunbar (1904) give this earlier timing for her death. Writing in 2007, Dries van den Akker, a Jesuit author and editor stated, "more recent sources, which are based on historical research, give the year 715 as her date of death". This is the year given in the 1921 Benedictines of Ramsgate's Book of Saints and a 1945 essay by Cristiani. At least one modern work (1985) shows both years for Adalsinda's death in different sections, as Akker notes.

== The two abbeys ==
Following her father's death in an attack, near Périgueux, c. 652, Adalsinda's mother, Richtrudis, retired to the Marchiennes Abbey that she and her husband had founded in 630. Her three daughters accompanied her there. All four became nuns, Richtrudis taking the role of abbess at Marchiennes. As Marchiennes had been made a dual monastery by Richtrudis around 647, her son Maurontius, once he became a monk, was also at the same abbey for a time. The abbey followed the Rule of Saint Columbanus from its founding until 1024, when it became a Benedictine monastery.

The earlier established (c. 625) Hamay Abbey nearby at Wandignies-Hamage was located on the opposite side of the river Scarpe; it, too, had a connection to the family, being overseen by the sisters' paternal great-grandmother who was its founding abbess, Saint Gertrude of Hamay. The smaller Hamay Abbey was later absorbed by its larger neighbour, Marchienne, possibly when Marchienne became a solely male Benedictine establishment in 1024.
