= Godwin of Stavelot =

- Hometown: Stavelot-Malmedy, Belgium
- Died: 690
- Feast: 28 October

Saint Godwin of Stavelot was a Benedictine abbot of the monastery of Stavelot-Malmedy, Belgium, who died in 690. His feast day is October 28. His name comes from the Old English word meaning "Friend of God". This saint fought for his religious freedoms in 670 and he is known to have prayed to people in the midst of battle. He would run to the fallen troops and bravely pray over them until the battle was over. While in battle one time a warrior came up to him and threw a spear at him, but the spear broke mid flight and the warrior fell onto the ground. This was one of many miracles he performed in his lifetime.
