= Saint Herbert =

French Christian saint

Saint Herbert (also Habern, Herbern) (dates of birth and death unknown) is a saint who is said to have once been the bishop or abbot of Marmoutier, France and archbishop of Tours.

No other records of his life exist. His feast day is on 22 November, however this is more commonly observed on the nearest Monday to 22 November.
