= Jonatus =

Christian monk

Jonatus or Jonath (died c. 690) was a Christian monk. He was a monk at the monastery of Elnone under Abbot Amandus. He served as the first abbot of the monastery of Marchiennes from 641, according to the Annals of Marchiennes. This monastery had been founded as a male community by Amandus, but Jonatus introduced nuns. This took place not long after he became abbot, according to the Chronicle of Marchiennes. The first nun was Rictrude.

Around 652, Jonatus became the third abbot of Elnone. According to one 12th-century source, he governed Elnone on two separate occasions, first before becoming abbot of Marchiennes and then holding both abbeys simultaneously while Amandus was on his third pilgrimage to Rome. He spent his later years at Marchiennes. He died on 1 August around 690 or 695. He is recognized today as a saint in the Catholic Church. His feast is on 1 August in the revised 2004 edition of the Roman Martyrology, but he is not listed in the General Roman Calendar. The translation of his relics was also celebrated around Marchiennes into modern times on 8 April.

The earliest source for Jonatus' life is the work of Hucbald. In the 12th century, Galbert of Marchiennes wrote an account of his posthumous miracles, the Miracula Ionati. The Annals and Chronicle of Marchiennes are later sources. All of these sources were written after the raids of the Vikings in the late 9th century had resulted in the loss of Marchiennes's original documents. Jonatus is also listed as the third in the 12th-century list of abbots, the Series abbatum Sancti Amandi Elnonensis. While the Chronicle of Marchiennes describes him as "simple" (simplex), one 12th-century source from Elnone praises his "knowledge" (scientia). Some modern scholars, beginning with Jean Mabillon have proposed that Jonatus is the same person as Jonas of Bobbio, who was with Amandus between 638 and 641. No medieval source ever identifies the two or equates their names. One 12th-century source, the Poleticum Marcianensis cenobii, does name the first abbot as Jonas. Iliana Pagani has argued that the traditions of the two are so different that there is no reason to believe they refer to the same person. Alexander O'Hara has argued that the distinctiveness of the regional traditions only speaks to their authenticity and that it is highly unlike that there were two different people with such similar and unusual names active in the same circles at the same time.
