= Merinus =

Merinus may refer to:

- Saint Mirin, the Patron saint of Paisley in Scotland
- Merinus, a genus of darkling beetles
