= Ælfnoth of Stowe =

English hermit and martyr (died 700)

Ælfnoth

Martyr
- Born: unknown
- Died: 700; Stowe, Northamptonshire
- Venerated in: Eastern orthodox church, Roman Catholic Church, Church of England
- Major shrine: Stowe, Northamptonshire
- Feast: 27 February or 25 November

Ælfnoth or Alnoth (died 700) was an English hermit and martyr. Little is known of his life, though he is mentioned in Jocelyn's life of Werburgh as a pious neatherd at Weedon, who bore with great patience the ill-treatment of the bailiff placed over him, and who afterwards became a hermit in a very lonely spot, where he was eventually murdered by two robbers.

On this ground he was honoured as a martyr; and there was some concourse of pilgrims to his tomb at Stowe near Bugbrooke in Northamptonshire.

Ælfnoth is not mentioned in any surviving early calendars; his feast was later kept on 27 February or on 25 November.
