= Saint Flavitus =

Hermit in Lombardy, 5th–6th centuries

- Born: Lombardy
- Died: December 18, 630; Marcilly-le-Hayer
- Venerated in: Roman Catholic Church
- Feast: December 16

Saint Flavitus (or Flaive) was a priest and hermit of the early Middle Ages.

He was born in the mid-6th century in Lombardy. In 568, he was brought to the Champagne region of France as a prisoner of war, where his master made him intendant of his castle. After being slandered and falsely accused by his master's wife, he was able to cure them from an illness, so he was released out of gratitude.

Upon being set free from slavery, he was ordained priest by Saint Lupus at Sens, and retired to the solitude of Marcilly-le-Hayer, in the diocese of Troyes. He died on 18 December 630.

== Veneration ==
A chapel was built on the site of Flavitus' hermitage near Marcilly-le-Hayer in 1897. His relics were kept at the church of Sainte-Colombe in Sens, but destroyed in the 18th century. His cloak is preserved as a contact relic in a shrine in the cathedral in Sens. His feast is kept on 16 December.
