= Waningus =

French saint

Saint Waningus

Count
- Born: unknown Rouen, Normandy, France
- Died: c. 683
- Venerated in: Roman Catholic Church; Eastern Orthodox Church; Anglican Communion
- Feast: 9 January

Waningus (also Vaneng) (born in Rouen, died c. 683) was a Merovingian count and royal official under Clotaire III. He assisted Wandrille in establishing Fontenelle Abbey, and later founded Fécamp Abbey. He is recognized as a Christian saint.

== Life ==
Born in Rouen, Waningus was governor of the Pays de Caux in Neustria. Waningus was both pious, and fond of hunting. He had a particular devotion to Saint Aulaire. One night he dreamt that she reminded him of the difficulties the rich had in entering heaven. Around 648, he withdrew from court to assist Wandrille in founding Fontenelle Abbey, helping to endow it. Fontenelle followed the Rule of Saint Columbanus.

About ten years later, after recovering from a serious illness, Waningus founded the Church of the Holy Trinity and the adjoining Abbaye de la Trinité de Fécamp for nuns. Around 675, the blinded bishop Leodegar was sent to Fecamp, where the nuns tended him with care, until in October 678 he was removed at the instance of the Mayor of the palace, Ebroin, and murdered.

Waningus's relics were moved from Fecamp to the Augustinian house at Ham in the ninth century. His feast day is kept on 18 December; his relics are at Ghent, Belgium.

== Desiderius of Fontenelle ==
Desiderius of Fontenelle

Monk
- Died: c. 700; Fontenelle Abbey
- Venerated in: Roman Catholic Church; Eastern Orthodox Church
- Feast: 18 December

Waningus entrusted his son, Desiderius (died c. 700) to the abbot of Fontenelle to be educated. Desiderius later became a monk at the abbey. He also is considered a saint.
