= Ernan =

Ernan (variants include Ernain, Ernin, Ethernanus) is the name of four Irish saints.

== Ernan, son of Eogan ==
Ernan, son of Eogan, died around 640. Mentioned in the Martyrology of Tallaght on 1 January, he was a nephew of Columba and sometime missionary to the Picts. His monastery in Ireland was at Druim-Tomma in the district of Drumhome, County Donegal. He is venerated as the patron saint of Killernan, though he may not have visited Scotland and also as patron of the parish of Drumhome, where a school has been dedicated to him. Kilviceuen ("church of the son of Eogan") in Mull, and of Kilearnadale in Jura, may have been dedicated in his honor. In the Scottish Kalendars, his commemoration is assigned to 21 and 22 December.

== Ernán, abbot of Hinba ==
Ernán, abbot of Hinba lived in the sixth century. An uncle of Columba, Ernán was one of the twelve who accompanied Columba from Ireland to Iona. He was appointed head of the community which Columba had established on the island of "Hinba". This island may have been Canna, about four miles northwest of Rùm, but it may also have been Jura or Eileach an Naoimh, one of the Garvellachs, between Scarba and Mull. St Ernan's Kirk, Aridhglas, Isle of Mull, is dedicated to him.

According to Columba's biographer, Ernán was only abbot for a few days. In the story recorded, he was told by his nephew before leaving to Hinba that he did not expect to see him again in this life, and several days later, Ernán became sick and went back to Iona to see his nephew, according to his own wish. When Columba was told his uncle had returned, Columba happily went out to meet him in the harbour, but when they were only 50 yards distant, Ernán fell down dead.

== Ernan of Cluvain-Deoghra ==
Ernan of Cluvain-Deoghra lived in the sixth or seventh century. Cluvain-Deoghra may have been in Meath or in County Longford. He was an acquaintance of Féchín of Fore. Ernan's feast day falls on 11 January in the Martyrology of Tallagh.

== Ernan of Torach ==
Ernan of Torach died on 17 August c. 650. Columba had founded a church and monastery on island of Torach or Tory, off the northwest coast of Donegal. it is uncertain whether Ernan accompanied Columba initially to Torach, but he was chosen to be its abbot. Of him, the Catholic Encyclopedia states: "It has been conjectured that this Ernan is identical with the Ernan whose name appears in the epistle of John, the pope-elect, to the prelates of northern Ireland in 640. If this be so, he must have been a person of some importance."
