= Madelgisilus =

Madelgisilus or Mauguille was a medieval Irish saint.

Madelgisilus (or Maguil) was a friend of Saint Fursey, and travelled with the latter to Picardy in France in the first half of the 7th century.

After the death of Fursey, Maguil retired among the monks of Saint-Riquier. But fearing that the esteem in which the monks held him might lead him to pride, with the abbot's leave, he hid himself in the solitude of Monstrelet, upon the river Authie, where he led a contemplative life.

St Maguil died about the year 685. His body was initially buried in the chapel of the hermitage of Saint-Riquier, but later removed to a church of his name built near Saint-Riquier. He is honoured on 30 May, which is supposed to be the day on which he died.

== Sources ==
- The Lives of the Irish Saints, Canon John O'Hanlon, Volume 5, 1873–1905.
