= Autbod =

Irish Catholic priest (7th century)

- Venerated in: Catholic Church
- Feast: 20 November

Autbod or Obode was a 7th-century Irish Christian missionary in areas that are now in Belgium and northern France.

A companion of Foillan and Saint Ultan, he went on preaching circuits of Hainaut, Artois and Picardy before withdrawing to a hermitage near Laon, where he probably died around the year 690.
