= Adalbard =

Frankish nobleman and saint

Saint Adalbard I of Ostrevent
- Died: 652; Gascony, France
- Venerated in: Catholic Church
- Feast: February 2; May 2
- Influences: Saint Amand of Maastricht

Adalbert I of Ostrevent (died 652) was a 7th-century Frankish nobleman of the court of King Clovis II of France. He is recognized as a saint, and is commemorated on both 2 February (his martyrdom) and 2 May (translation of his relics to Douai in 1221).

== Life ==
Adalbald was the son of Gerberga, daughter of the magister militum Richomer and grandson of Gertrude of Hamage (died 649), who founded a nunnery at Wandignies-Hamage near Douai. According to Alban Butler, Adalbald had two brothers, Sigefrid, count of Ponthieu, and Archenald, Mayor of the Palace to Clovis II, son of Dagobert, to whom they were related. His relationship with Merovingian King Dagobert has been proposed to have been through his mother Gerberga, and her putative sister Bertrude (or perhaps Haldetrude, Clothar's first wife). However, Karine Ugé argues that the connection between Adalbald and Erchinoald is a fiction developed by the canons of Saint-Amé (Saint Amatus) at Douai to enhance a connection with Rictrude.

Adalbald was a leading noble and claimed lordship of Douai. He was a disciple of Amand of Maastricht. In 630, Adalbald founded Marchiennes Abbey. During a military expedition in Gascony, he met and married Rictrude of Marchiennes, daughter of Ernoldo, lord of Toulouse, despite the opposition of both families. Although her parents approved, others opposed a marriage to a Frank. The marriage was said to be happy. They had four children: Maurant, abbot of Breuil (died 702); Eusebia of Douai (also known as Ysoie) (died c. 680), abbess of Hamage Abbey near Arras; Adalsinda, a nun at Hamage (died 714); and Clotsinda (died 714). All are venerated as saints.

The couple opened their castle to the poor and disadvantaged. The hermit-monk Richarius was a family friend. Adalbald's wife made Marchiennes Abbey a double monastery in 643.

Adalbard was assassinated in obscure circumstances in 652, near Périgueux during a subsequent expedition to Aquitaine, probably by his wife's relatives still bitter about the marriage to an enemy of her people. His body was returned to Flanders and buried at Saint-Amand Abbey where he was venerated as a martyr, as his death had taken place in a region which largely had not yet adopted Christianity. His name, however, is not currently mentioned in the liturgical calendars of Cambrai and Lille.

After the death of Adalbald, his brother Archenald (Erkenwald) rebuilt the castle of Douai (which gave rise to the town) and founded the church of Our Lady, now dedicated to Saint Amatus.
