= Rictrude =

Saint Rictrude of Marchiennes
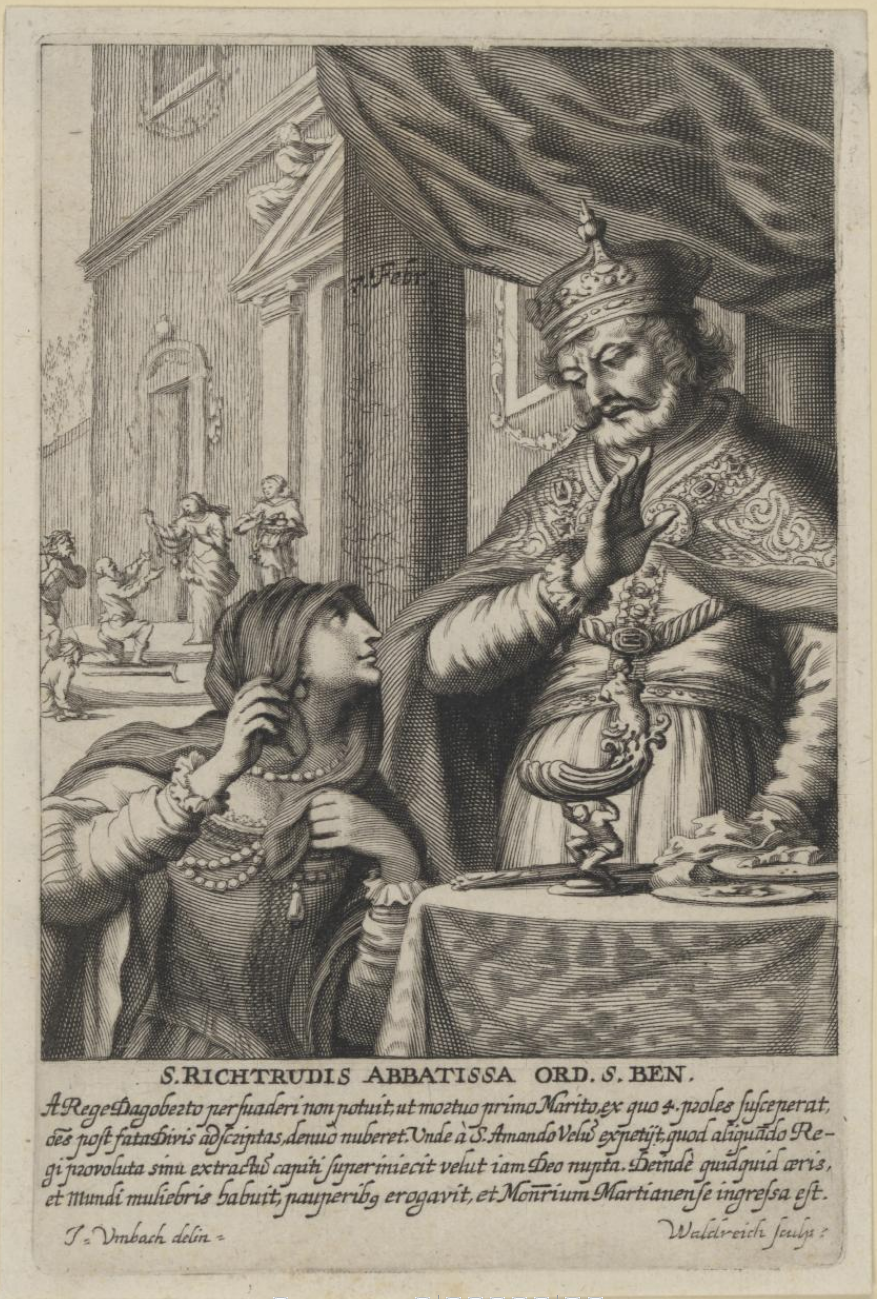
- Rictrude with King Dagobert (1677 drawing)
- Born: c. 612 – c. 614; Gascony
- Died: c. 676 – c. 691; Marchiennes
- Venerated in: Catholic Church
- Feast: 12 May

Rictrude (also called Rictrudis, Rictrudes, Richtrudis, Richrudis) (b. c. 612 – c. 614; d. c. 676 – c. 691) was a saint and abbess of Marchiennes Abbey, in Flanders. The main source for her life is the Vita Sanctae Rictrudis, commissioned by the abbey, and written in 907 by Hucbald. She married Saint Adalbard, despite the opposition of her family. They had four children, all of whom were later named saints. Soon after the death of their youngest child, Adalbard was assassinated. Rictrude eventually entered the religious life, even though the king opposed her decision to not remarry. She is seen as an example of the practice of medieval women embracing the religious life to ensure the "royal centralization of land and power out of the reach of secular politics" and a representation of "a systematic family strategy of diverting wealth and women away from the predatory king and his ambitious courtiers".

Rictrude died at Marchiennes at the age of 74, between 676 and 691. Her feast day is May 12.

== Life ==
Rictrude was born around 612 in Gascony during a series of Basque raids in France and at the time of the reign of Clothar II, to "a noble and devout family", most likely of the Gascon nobility. Her father was Ernold, and her mother was Lichia. At a young age, Rictrude's spiritual advisor was St. Amandus, the bishop and missionary, who had been exiled to Gascony by Dagobert I. Rictrude was the subject of a hagiography entitled Vita Sanctae Rictrudis, written by Hucbald, a Benedictine monk who resided at Saint-Armand Abbey in 907.

According to Rictrude's Vita, "A certain Frank—born Adalbard, child of a just and noble stock, saw [Rictrude], loved her and chose her for his own". The Vita calls Adalbard "a fully worthy man who would take the worthy Rictrude in marriage" despite the "violent opposition of her parents". The Vita describes Rictrude, by contast, "as an exception who was predestined to sancity" because she was from a pagan region. Rictrude and Adalbard married during a military expedition in Gascony; he was a saint, a nobleman, and a "loved and honored" member of the court of Dagobert I and Clovis II. Scholar Jo Ann McNamara places their marriage in the context of the Frankish settlement in France and the internal turbulence of the time. They lived in Marchiennes, where he owned land. They had four children, all of whom were later named saints: a son named Maurontus of Douai, who became a court official, and later, a priest and abbot; and three daughters, Clotsendus, who succeeded her mother as abbess, Eusebia of Hamage, who was an abbess at Hamay, and Adalsinda of Hamage, who was a nun at Hamay. According to scholar Karine Uge, the children were "baptized by the most prestigious people of their time". Maurontius was baptized by the Frankish hermit and monk St. Richarius, and Clotsendus by Saint Amandus. Nanthild, wife of Dagobert, was Eusebia's godmother. Adalsinda died at a young age, before Rictrude's death. Rictrude's Vita claims that Rictrude and Adalbard had a "devout and joyful life".

Soon after the birth of their youngest child, Adalbald was assassinated on his way from Marquette-en-Ostrevant to Gascony, perhaps by his father-in-law, "who was offended by the fact that his daughter had married an enemy of his people". Ritrude's Vita claims that she mourned his death. She was advised by Amandus, who had become her spiritual advisor, to found an abbey and a monastery at Marchiennes. Amandus also advised her, after her son Maruontus came of age, to enter the monastery, which she governed for 40 years. However, the king, who is not named in the Vita but was probably Dagobert I, was determined that she marry one of his officials. At first, the king tried to persuade her with gifts and flattery, but when that did not work, he threatened her. She pretended to go along with his demands, but she "remained constant in her proposed vows to serve God" while Amandus promised to use his influence to obtain the king's agreement. At one point, she "carefully staged a dramatic demonstration of her determination to resist the king's will and to follow her religious aspirations". She hosted a banquet with the king and his court in her villa in Boiry, and in the middle of the feast, she stood up, and instead of toasting her guests, she covered her head with the veil blessed by Amandus to "display her desire to enter the religious life". The king left the banquet in anger, but Amand eventually mediated a reconciliation between them, and Clovis II permitted her to move into Marchiennes Abbey, which was a double monastery.

Scholar Jo Ann McNamara states that Dagobert's demand that Rictrude remarry must be placed within the political context at the time. McNamara adds, "Noble women, sometimes in family teams, embraced the religious life and endowed lasting establishments in the north and east of the kingdom". The practice, supported by artistocrat appointments as bishops, encouraged the "royal centralizaton of land and power out of the reach of secular politics". McNamara says, in a footnote in her discussion about Rictrude, that it also represented "a systematic family strategy of diverting wealth and women away from the predatory king and his ambitious courtiers" and reflected "a practice of deploying women in religious service involving both administrative and, above all, charitable activities". She was also an important figure in the movement to the "ultimate replacement of the Merovingian dynasty in the mid-eighth century".

Rictrude died at Marchiennes at the age of 74, between 676 and 691. Her daughter, Clotsendus, succeeded her as abbess in 635. Rictrude performed miracles after her death described in her Vita, including healing blindness, muteness, paralysis, high fevers, and various illnesses. Her body is emtombed at Marchiennes, and several churches in Flanders have been dedicated to her. According to McNamara, Rictrude is still venerated in modern Belgium. Her feast day is May 12.

== Works cited ==
- McNamara, Jo Ann; Halborg, John E.; Whatley, E. Gordon (1996). "Rictrude, Abbess of Marchiennes". In McNamara, Jo Ann; Halborg, John E.; Whatley, E. Gordon (eds.). Sainted Women of the Dark Ages. Duke University Press. pp. 195–219. ISBN 0-8223-1200-X.
- Uge, Karine (2005). Creating the Monastic Past in Medieval Flanders. Woodbridge, U.K.: York Medieval Press. ISBN 1-903153-16-6.
