= Amandus =

French bishop venerated as a saint (584–679)

Saint Amand
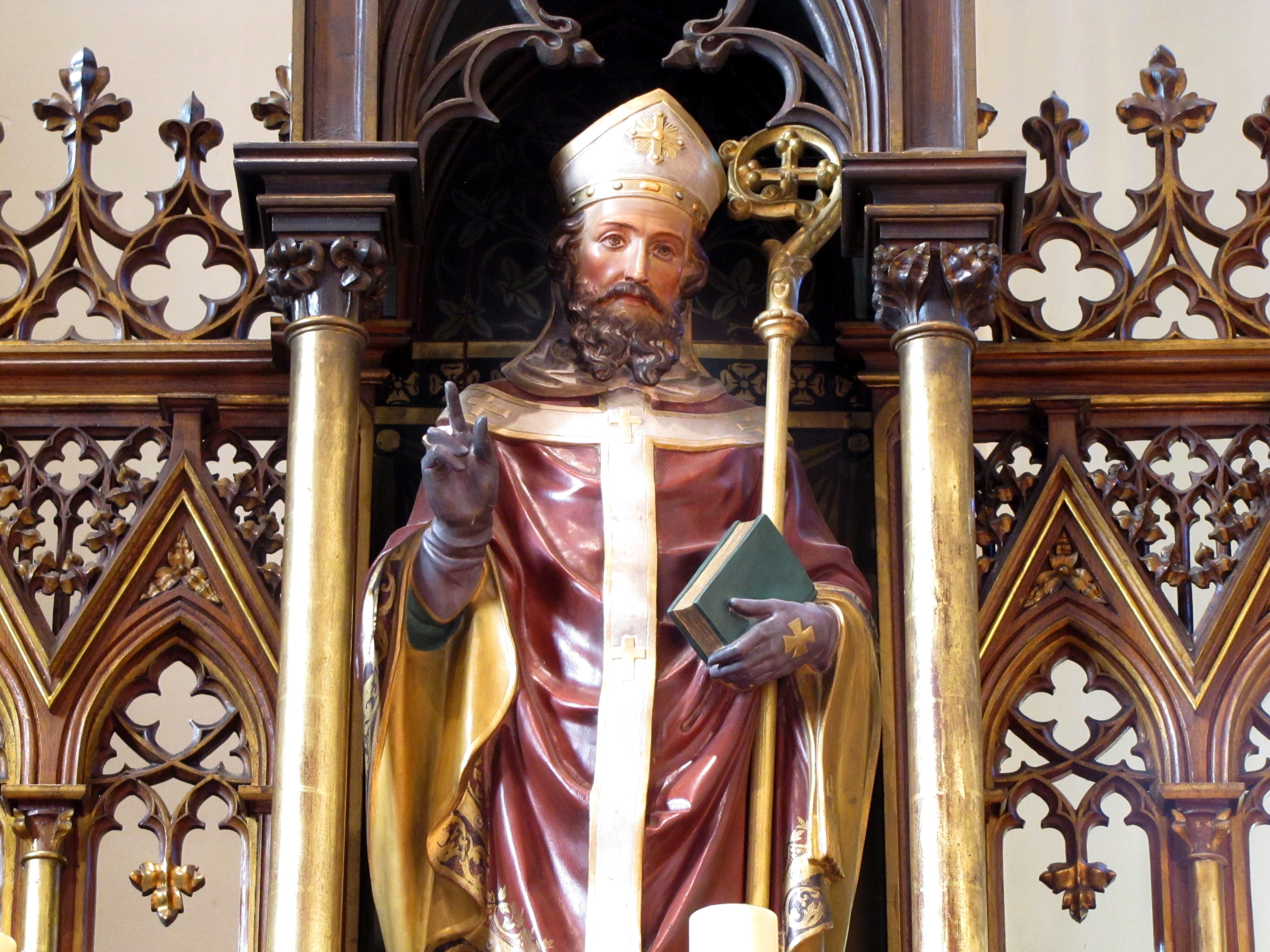
- St Amandus, Église Saint-Maurice
- Born: 584; Lower Poitou, Neustria, France
- Died: 679; Saint-Amand
- Venerated in: Roman Catholic Church; Eastern Orthodox Church
- Feast: February 6 (formerly February 1 and October 26)
- Attributes: Chair, church, flag
- Patronage: Wine makers, Beer brewers, merchants, innkeepers, bartenders

Amandus (c. 584 – 679), commonly called Saint Amand, was a bishop of Tongeren-Maastricht and one of the catholic missionaries of Flanders. He is venerated as a saint, particularly in France and Belgium.

== Life ==
The chief source of details of his life is the Vita Sancti Amandi, an eighth-century text attributed to Beaudemond (Latin: Baudemundus). The vita was expanded by Philippe, abbot of Aumône. According to this biography, Amand was born in Lower Poitou. He was of noble birth but at the age of twenty, he became a monk on the Île d'Yeu, against the wishes of his family. His father threatened to disinherit him if he did not return home. From there Amandus went to Bourges and became a pupil of bishop Austregisilus. There he lived in solitude in a cell for fifteen years, living on no more than bread and water.

Humbert of Maroilles was of a noble family and trained as a monk in Laon. However, upon the death of his parents, he returned to his estates in Mézières sur Oise to settle some inheritance issues and found fine food, servants, and various conveniences sufficiently distracting that he gave up any thought of the monastic life, until one day Amandus took him on a pilgrimage to Rome. Humbert became his disciple and companion.

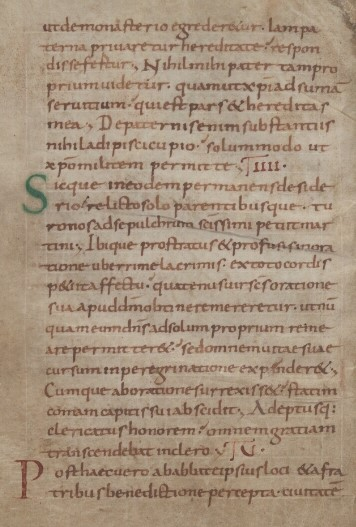
Excerpt from the Vita St. Amandi manuscript. Manufactured in Ghent, ca. 10th century. Preserved in the Ghent University Library.

After the pilgrimage to Rome, Amandus was made a missionary bishop in the Merovingian kingdom in 628, without a fixed diocese. At the request of Clotaire II, he evangelized the pagan inhabitants of Ghent, later extending his field of operations to all of Flanders. Initially, he had little success, suffering persecution and undergoing great hardships. However, after allegedly performing a miracle (bringing back to life a hanged criminal) the attitude of the people changed and he made many converts. He founded a monastery at Elnon where he served as abbot for four years. Amandus was made a bishop in 628.

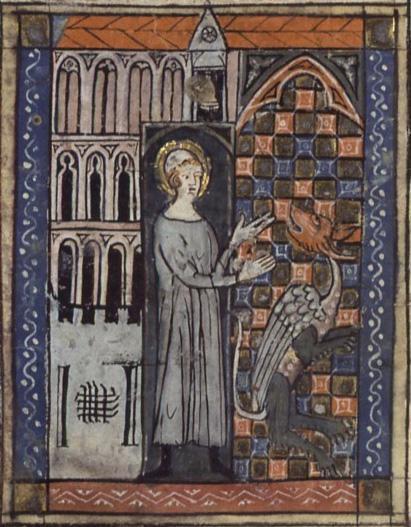
St. Amandus and the serpent, from a 14th-century manuscript

He returned to the Merovingian kingdom in 630. Amandus was a close friend of Adalbard of Ostrevent, whom he advised on the founding Marchiennes Abbey. His disciple, Jonatus, was made abbot of the new house. Amandus, however, angered Dagobert I by attempting to have the king amend his life. In spite of the intervention of Acarius, Amand was expelled from the kingdom and went to Gascony.

Later Dagobert asked him to return and tutor the heir to the throne. Amand however declined. In 633, Amandus founded two monasteries in Ghent; one at Blandinberg, and the other named for St. Bavo, who gave his estate for its foundation. His next missionary task was among the Slavic people of the Danube valley in present-day Slovakia but this was unsuccessful. Amand went to Rome and reported to the Pope. In 639, he built an abbey near Tournai.

From 647 till 650, Amand briefly served as Bishop of Maastricht. The pope gave him some advice on how to deal with disobedient clerics and told him about the Monothelite, at that time prevalent in the East. Amand was commissioned by the pope to organize church councils in Neustria and Austrasia in order to pass on the various decrees from Rome. The bishops asked Amand to transmit the proceedings of the church councils to the pope. He resigned the see to St. Remaclus, to resume his missionary work.

Around this time, Amand established contact with the family of Pepin of Landen and helped Gertrude of Nivelles and her mother Itta establishing the famous monastery of Nivelles. At the same time, he was now 70 years old, the inhabitants of the Basque country asked him to return to their country to evangelize, although 30 years earlier he had preached there in vain. Returning home, he founded several more monasteries in present-day Belgium with the help of king Dagobert.

Amand died in Elnone Abbey (later Saint-Amand Abbey, in Saint-Amand-les-Eaux, near Tournai) at the age of ninety.

== Veneration ==
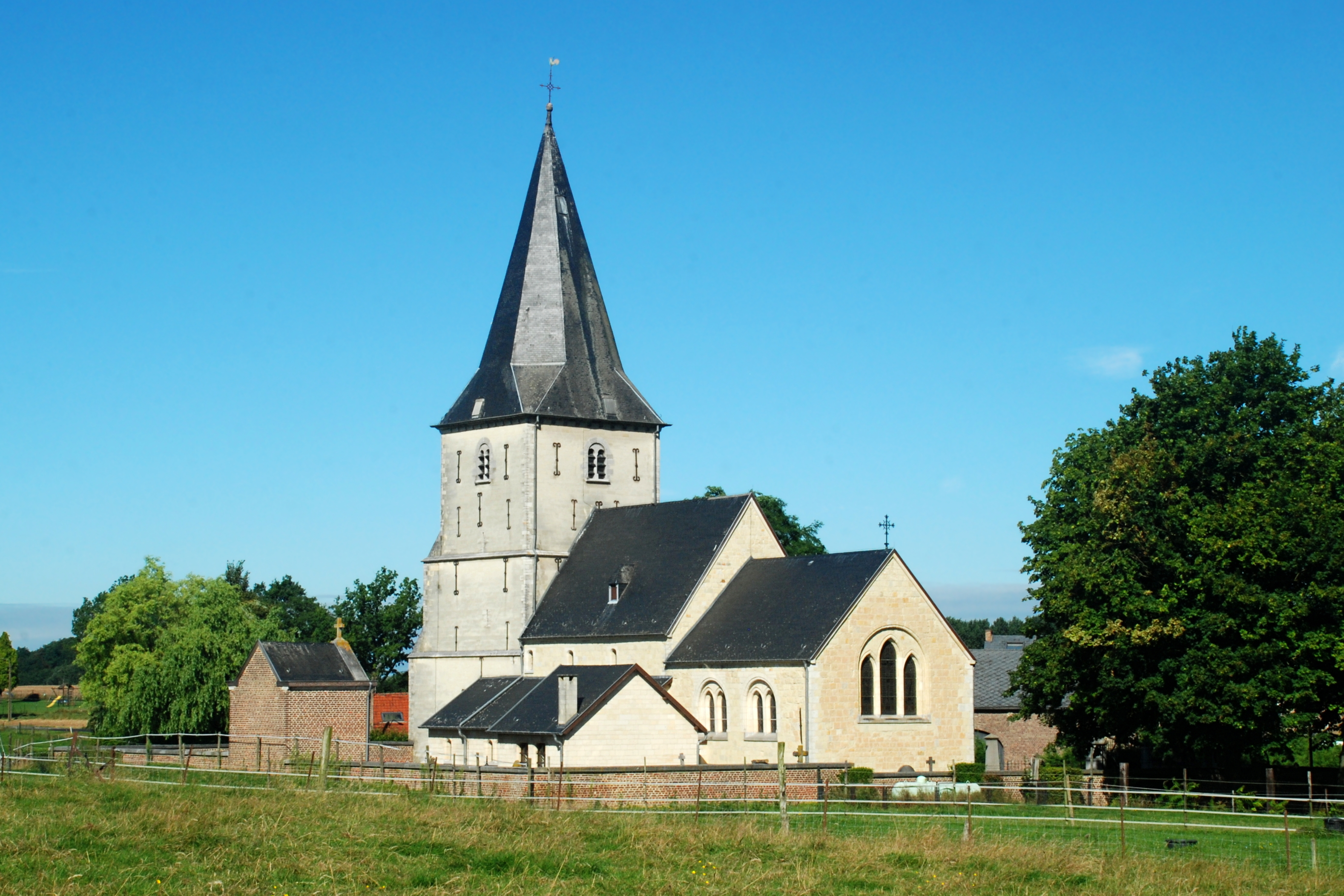
The village church of Wezeren, Belgium is dedicated to Amandus

Known for his hospitality, Amand is the patron saint of all who produce beer: brewers, innkeepers and bartenders. He is also the patron of vine growers, vintners and merchants, and of Boy Scouts.

His feast day is 6 February. Although mostly revered in Flanders and Picardy, he is also venerated in England, where at least one private chapel (at East Hendred in Oxfordshire) is dedicated to him.
