= Marchiennes Abbey =

Abbey in France

Coordinates: 50°24′29″N 3°16′52″E

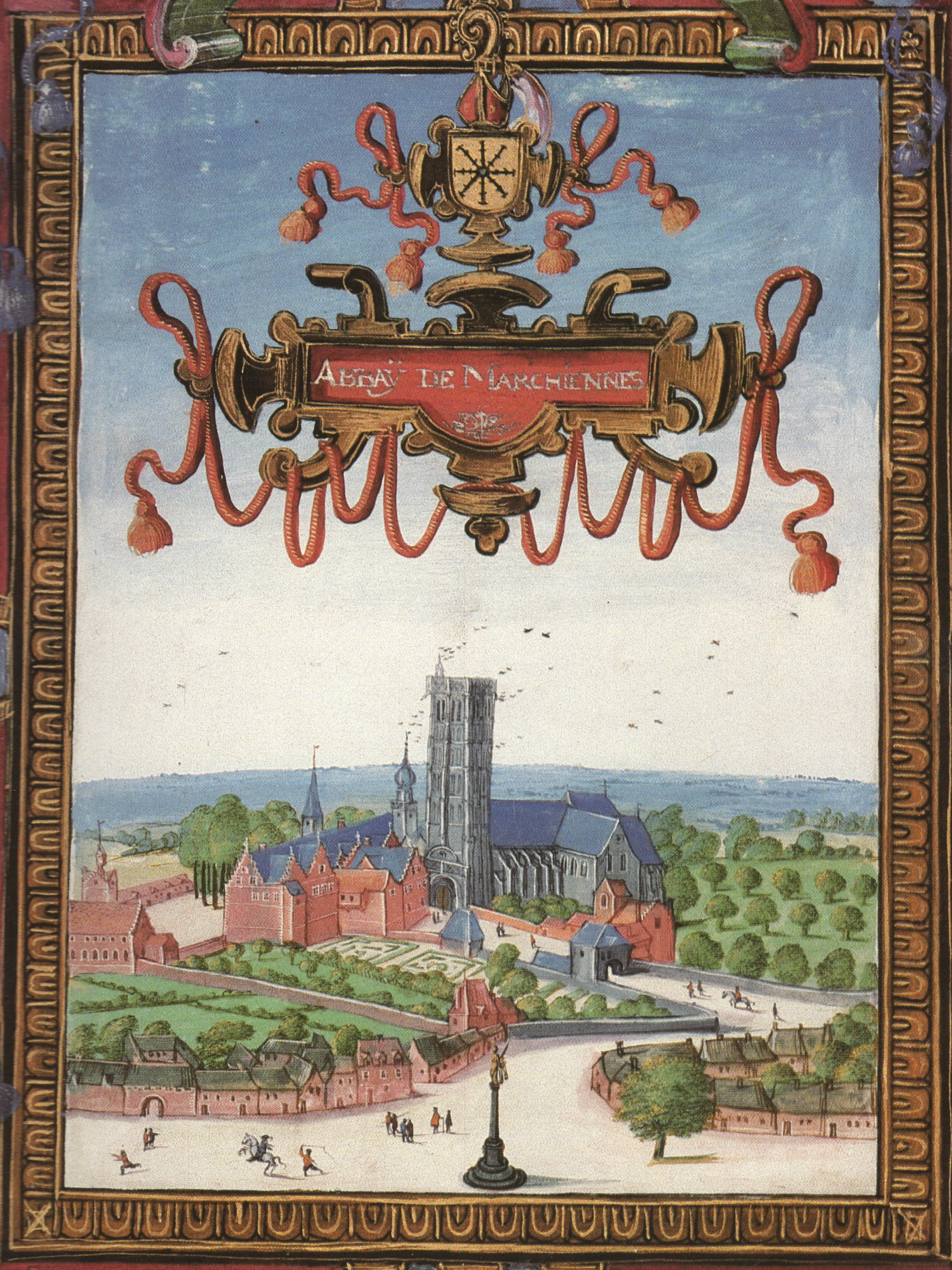
General view of the Abbey

Marchiennes Abbey was a French monastery located on the Scarpe in Marchiennes. It was founded around 630 by Adalbard of Douai, and Irish monks, disciples of Saint Columbanus, on the advice of Saint Amand. One of its founders was Rictrude, who made it double monastery in 643. In around 1024 it became monastery of men again and adopted the Rule of Saint Benedict. On the birth of the town of Marchiennes the abbey became its economic motor until being suppressed in 1791 during the French Revolution. In 1814 all but its 1748 gatehouse was demolished. Its remains were inscribed on the inventory of monuments historiques on 17 May 1974,

== History ==
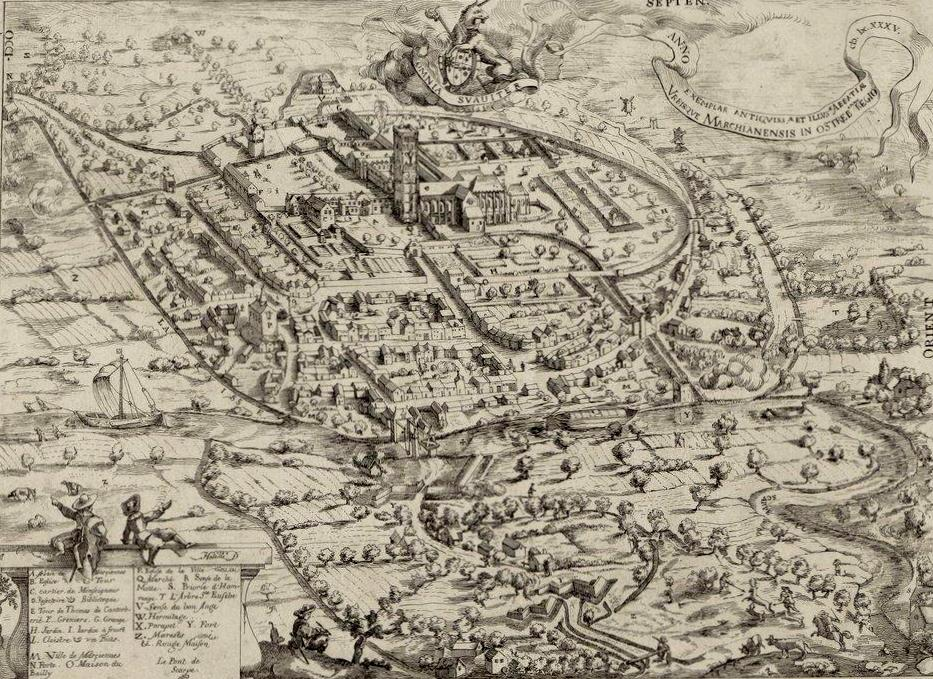
Plan de Marchiennes et son abbaye en 1635

The monastery was founded around 630 AD by Irish monks, disciples of Saint Columbanus and Adalbard of Douai, on the advice of Saint Amand. After the death of Adalbert I of Ostrevent in 642 AD, his widow, Rictrude, made it a double monastery with herself as the first Abbess. There are among the founders, besides Adalbaud and Rictrude, St. Eusebius (d. 660) (their daughter) and Saint Maurant (their son).

The monastery managed to grow as the city and region bought clearing, drainage and exploitation of marshes and bogs. However it was devastated by the Normans in the 9th century and the end of the 10th century. In 1024 AD, Marchiennes become a male only community under the rule of saint Benedict. From the 11th to the 13th century Marchiennes becomes one of the major abbeys in the North of the France. Its scriptorium produced a significant number of illuminated manuscripts. On May 16, 1133, the relics of Saint Eusebius were interred.

In the 16th century, the Abbey benefits was at the peak of its power. It supported the creation of a college at the University of Douai between 1564 and 1570. However, in August 1566, the abbey was devastated by iconoclasts who destroyed most of its devotional artworks. Robust activity persists until the 18th century when its fortunes changed.

In 1712, at the famous siege of Marchiennes, the Abbey and town were bombed for four days and partially destroyed. A restoration was undertaken. Most of the remaining buildings today date from this period. In 1791, the monastery closed during the religious persecution launched by the French Revolution.

The Tower of the Abbey Church was pulled down in 1817, following the fate of other buildings sold at the turn of the century as national property.

Today the remains include the Abbey gate dating from 1748, some operations building built by the monks and the brewery is being restored. On May 17, 1974, the Abbey remains were registered in the inventory of historical monuments at the French Ministry of Culture.

== Known abbots and abbesses ==
- Amandus (fl. 630)
- Jonatus (c.643–c.652)
- Abbess Rictrude (fl. 614–688), established it as a double monastery and first abbess
- Abbess Clothsindis (fl. 650)
- Abbess Judith
- Alard
- Wido
- Popo of Stavelot (fl. 1030)
- Fulcard de Landas (1103–1115)
- Armand de Castello (fl. 1120)
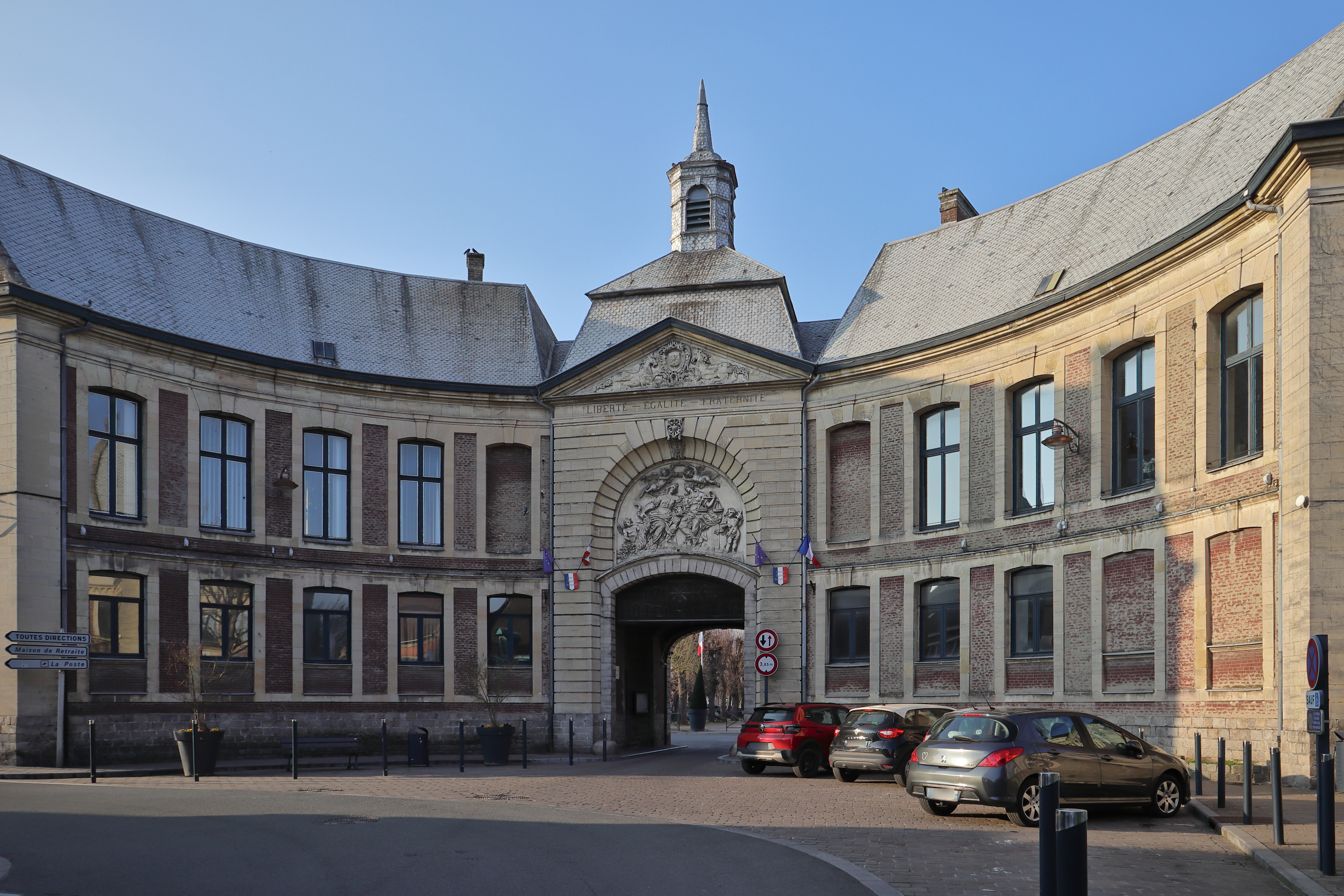
Old entrance to the abbey.

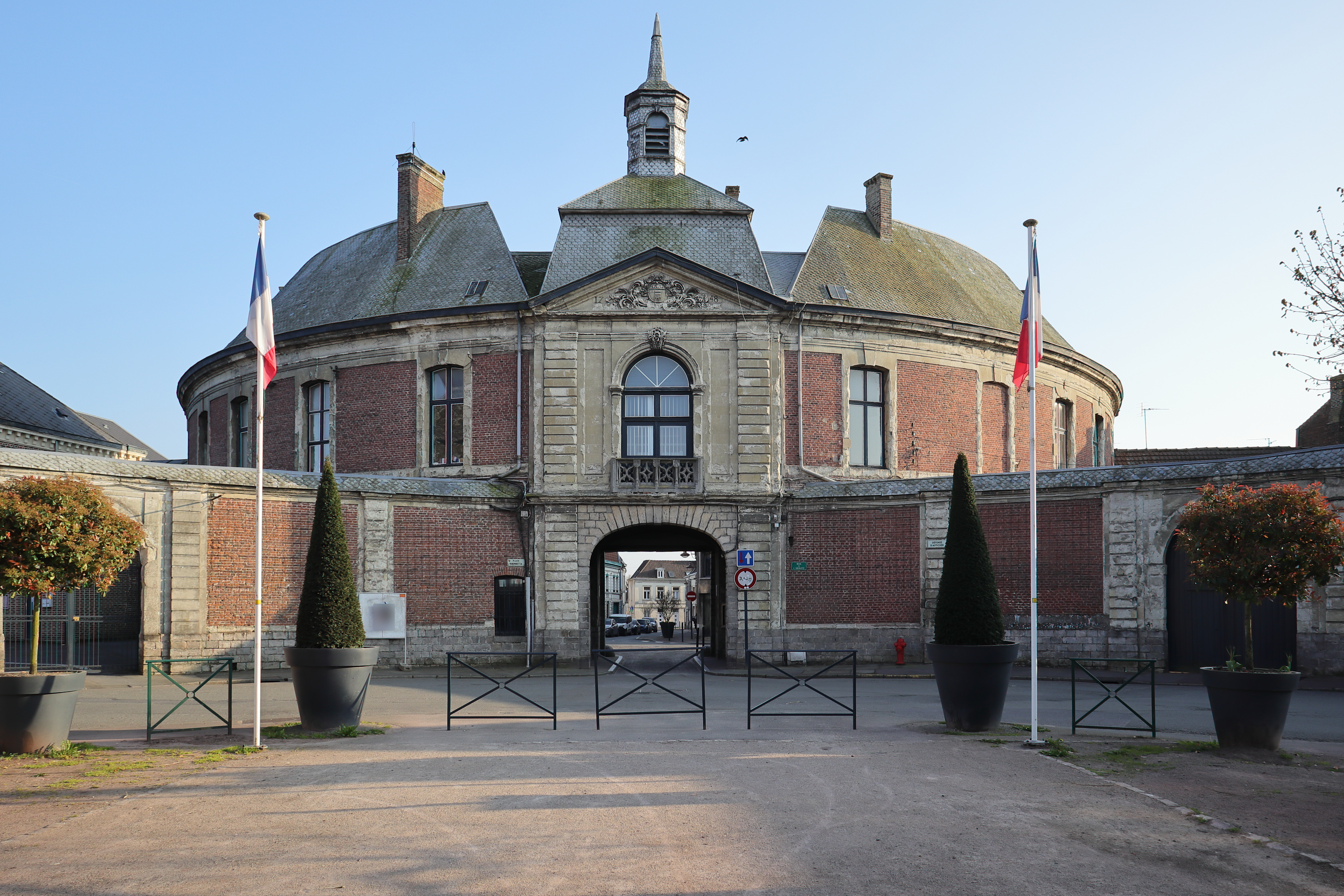

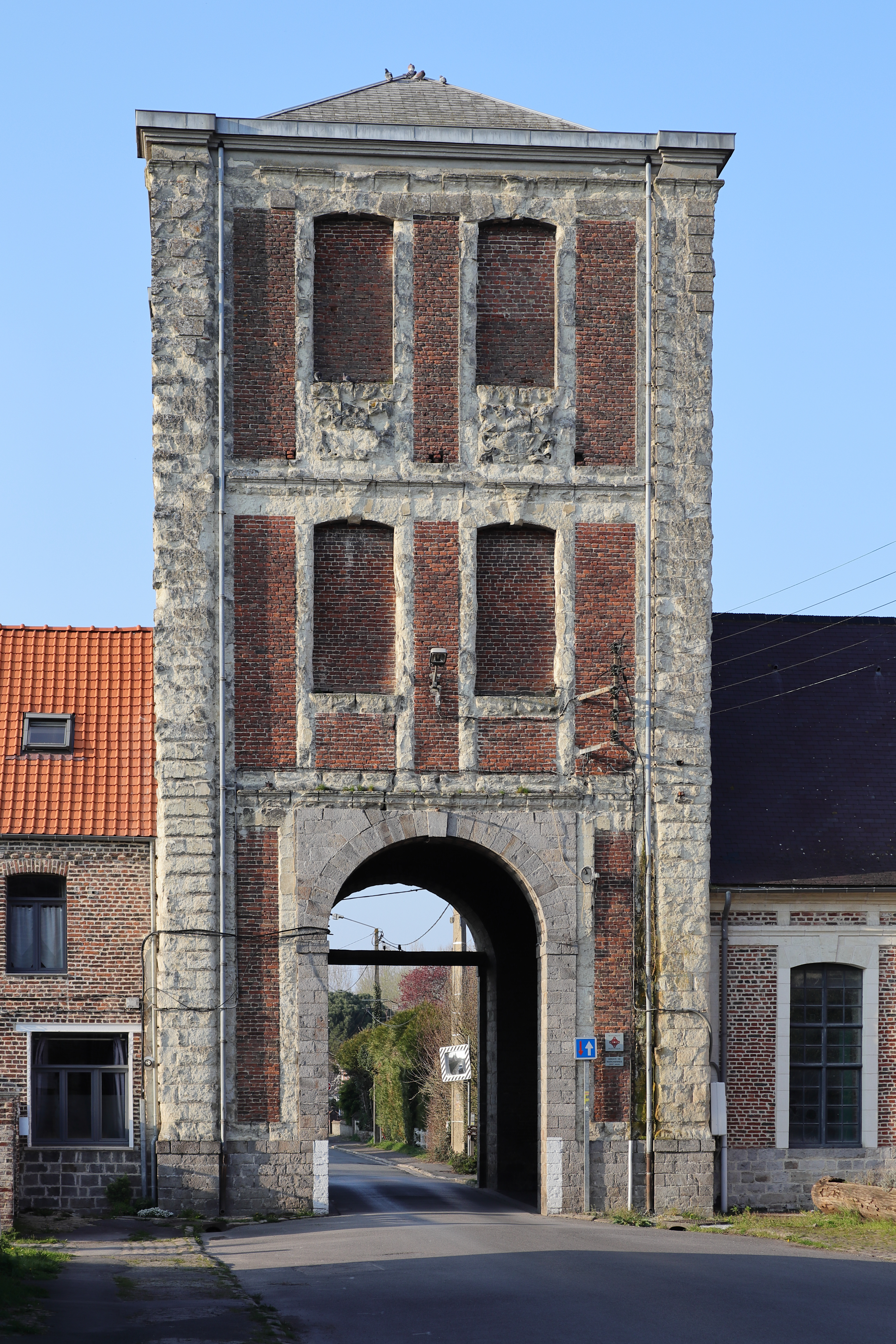
Dove of the abbey.

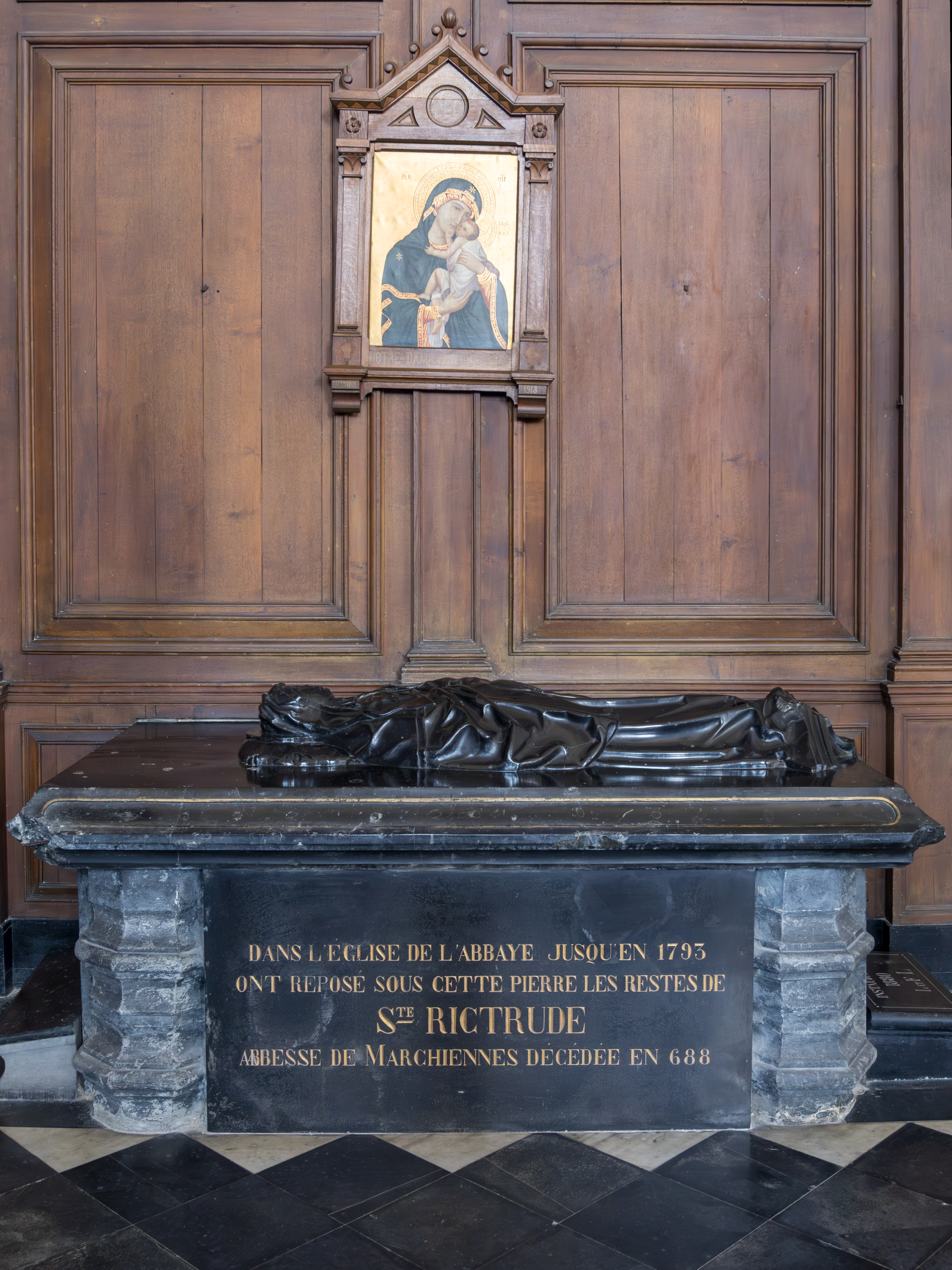
Pea of Sainte Rictrude in the church of Marchiennes.

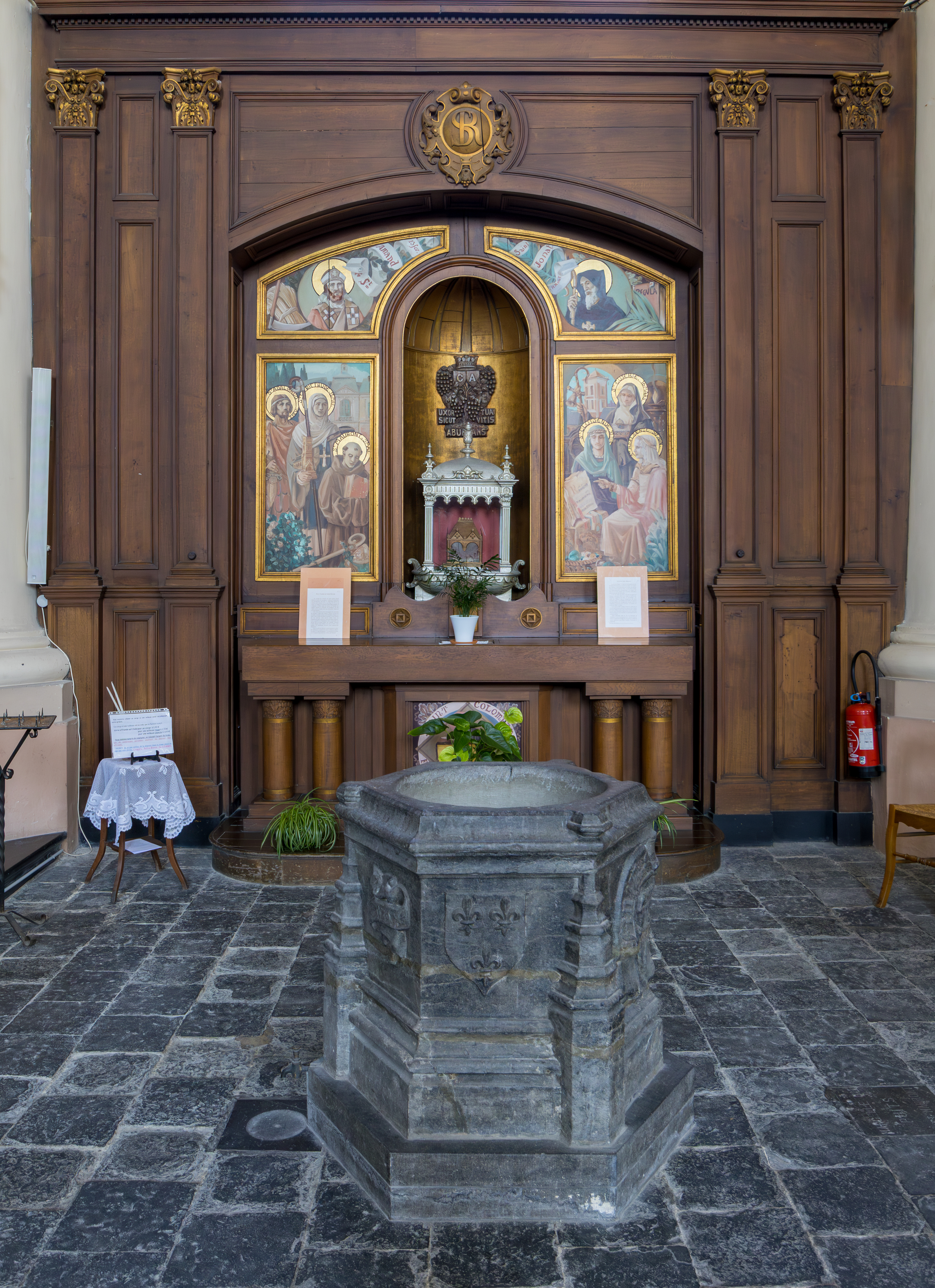
Reliquary of St. Rictrude.
