= Wendreda =

Anglo-Saxon nun and saint

Saint Wendreda
- Born: date unknown Perhaps Exning, Suffolk
- Died: date unknown March, Isle of Ely
- Venerated in: Roman Catholic Church; Anglican Communion, Orthodox Church
- Major shrine: Ely Cathedral; St Wendreda's Church, March
- Feast: 22 January
- Attributes: Nun, healer
- Patronage: March, Cambridgeshire

Wendreda, also known as Wendreth, was an Anglo-Saxon nun, healer, and saint, perhaps of the 7th century. She was uncertainly reported as a daughter of King Anna of East Anglia, a Christian king, which would make her a sister of Etheldreda, abbess of Ely, Sexburgha, abbess of Minster-in-Sheppey, and Ethelburga, abbess of Faremoutiers, who are all better-known saints, and a half-sister of Sæthryth, also an abbess of Faremoutiers.

Wendreda is associated with March, in the Isle of Ely, and Exning, Suffolk.

== Life ==
Perhaps a daughter of Anna, king of the East Angles, Wendreda may have grown up at Exning near Newmarket. Three of the daughters of Anna married kings, but, instead of marrying, Wendreda became a nun and a herbalist, expert in the arts of healing sick people and animals. She established herself in the wetlands of the Fens and according to one source founded a Benedictine nunnery at March, where she spent the rest of her life. She became famous as a healer, and eventually miraculous powers were attributed to her.

Frances Egerton Arnold-Forster wrote in 1899 that Wendreda may have been an abbess, "for a little piece of ground opposite the church still retains its old name of 'the Nunnery'." She adds that an old coffin-lid was discovered there and moved to the churchyard and quotes the Rev. Charles E. Walker, Rector of March in 1890, as saying "It is evident that there was a small conventual establishment there, in all probability connected with S. Wendreda, but no trace of foundations or document can I discover."

Agnes Dunbar said of Wendreda a few years later

St. Wendreda, or WENDRETH, Virgin, probably not later than 11th century. Patron of the town of March in Cambridgeshire. She was perhaps the founder and abbess of the church that bears her name at March, and of a nunnery that is believed to have adjoined it. Her relics and those of ST. PANDIONA are at Eltisley, Cambs.

== Relics, church, and well ==
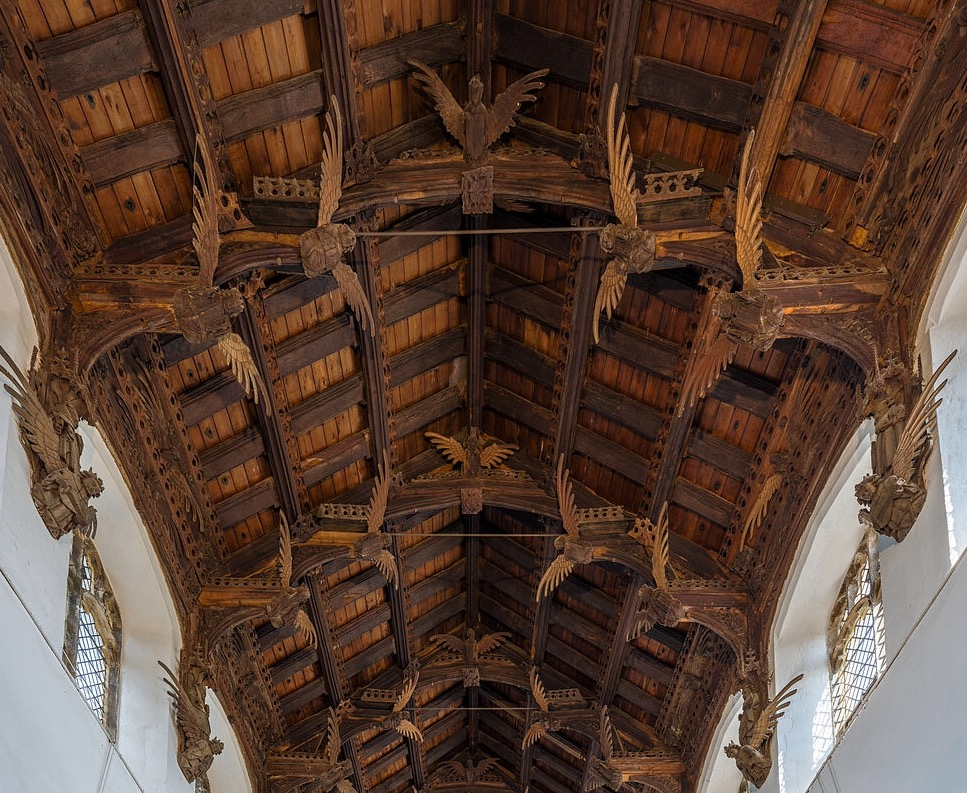
The angel roof celebrating St Wendreda in March, Isle of Ely

According to Joseph Strutt, "The body of St. Wendreda, a virgin, was brought by Esinus (abbot of Ely) to Ely, where it was laid in a rich shrine most superbly ornamented with gold and precious stones." The remains were kept in a golden shrine in Ely Abbey (now Ely Cathedral) until 1016, when Edmund Ironside bought them and carried them into battle, in the hope that they would bring him victory against the Danes. But Canute captured the relics at the Battle of Assandun and later gave them to Canterbury Cathedral. In 1343 Wendreda's remains were returned to March, but their final resting place is usually now said to be unknown. However, in Magna Britannia (1808) Daniel and Samuel Lysons stated that they were at Eltisley, and this claim was repeated in 1905 by Agnes Dunbar.

The only church dedicated to Wendreda is at March and is notable for its double-hammer beam roof celebrating the saint with 118 angels, carved from oak, the largest of them half life-size, looking down into the church with wings outstretched. John Betjeman said of it that it was "worth cycling forty miles in a head wind to see", and Clive Fewins has called it "the finest of all angel roofs".

A spring at Exning was named St Mindred's Well, and a local legend had it that the Saint used its water in her healing. Newmarket jockeys used to take horses there to drink before a race. As there is no other record of a saint called Mindred, the medieval scholar Montague Rhodes James writing in 1930 came to the conclusion that Mindred and Wendreda were one and the same. However, he adds that "this takes us very little farther, for nobody knows a single fact about St Wendreda." Following on from this, the water source, which is in the private grounds of the Hamilton Stud, is now called St Wendreda's Well.

== Wider veneration ==
Since the Middle Ages, Wendreda's status has increased, and her influence has travelled out widely from the local level. It was reported in 1998 that "As saint, Wendreda is now implicated in the networks of international Catholic power and policy. In a small way she has entered the political relations between Rome and Canterbury."

== See also ==
- Wynthryth
