= Wihtburh =

East Anglian princess and saint

Saint Wihtburh
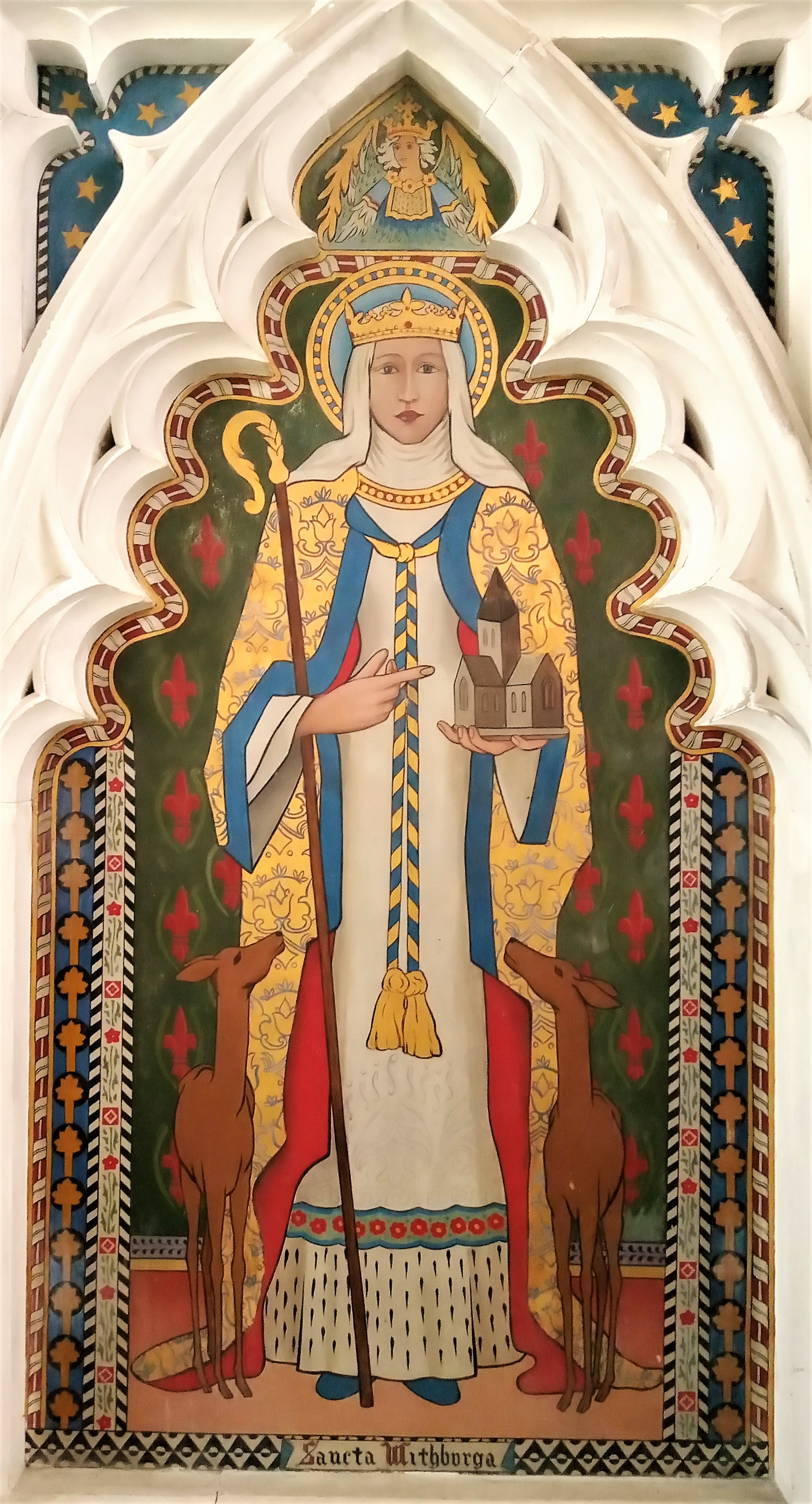
- St. Wihtburh, depicted in St Nicholas's Church, Dereham, Norfolk
- Died: 17 March 743; Dereham
- Venerated in: Roman Catholic Church; Anglican Communion, Eastern Orthodox Church
- Major shrine: Ely Cathedral; St Etheldreda's Church, London
- Feast: 8 July (translation of relics), March 17 (repose)
- Attributes: A pair of does; church
- Catholic cult suppressed: 1540s

Wihtburh (also Withburga or Withburge; died 743) was an East Anglian saint and abbess. She was renowned for founding and governing a convent at Dereham in Norfolk. The Dereham convent no longer exists except for St Nicholas Church.

According to folk tradition, Wihtburh was the youngest daughter of King Anna, king of the East Angles, but academics such as Virginia Blanton and Barbara Yorke have suggested that this is unlikely.

Withburh is traditionally linked to an account in which two does provided milk for Wihtburh's builders for her convent at Dereham, in Norfolk. When a local official attempted to hunt down the does, he was thrown from his horse and killed.

Withburh died in 743 and was buried at Dereham. Her body was said to be uncorrupted by age or decay when her tomb was opened half a century after her death, and the church and the tomb subsequently became a place of pilgrimage. When her relics were stolen on the orders of the abbot of Ely Abbey, the remains were re-interred at Ely next to her sisters Æthelthryth and Seaxburh. In 1106, Withburh's body was again examined and found to be intact.

Wihtburh's cult in Eastern England, which was never large, was closely linked with that of Æthelthryth, her supposed sister. As Æthelthryth is known to have been a daughter of King Anna of East Anglia, Wihtburh would have been her sister, if it is true that Wihtburh was a daughter of King Anna. Her veneration was suppressed during the Reformation in the 1540s, and her relics were all destroyed.

== Family ==
Wihtburh was supposedly one of the daughters of Anna of East Anglia, a son of Eni, a member of the Wuffingas dynasty, and a nephew of Rædwald, king of the East Angles from 600 to 625. East Anglia was an early and long-lived Anglo-Saxon kingdom that corresponds with the modern English counties of Norfolk and Suffolk. Due to their rivalry for control over the Middle Anglian people, East Anglia and its neighbour Mercia probably became hereditary enemies, and Mercia's king Penda repeatedly attacked the East Angles from the mid-630s to 654.

The sources for information about Wihtburh's family and the life and reign of Anna include the Historia ecclesiastica gentis Anglorum (Ecclesiastical History of the English People), completed in Northumbria by the English monk Bede in 731, and the Anglo-Saxon Chronicle, which dates the from 9th century. The Liber Eliensis, written at Ely in the 12th century, also provides information about Anna and his daughters.

Wihtburh is not mentioned by Bede, whose writings about her elder sisters Seaxburh of Ely, Æthelthryth, Æthelburh of Faremoutiers and Sæthryth, her older half-sister, indicate that he was well-informed about the family. References to Wihtburh first appear in 10th and 11th century records, and the medievalist Virginia Blanton has suggested that the connection between Wihtburh and the family of Anna is likely to be a fabrication, invented to enhance the status of Ely Abbey.

Family of Wihtburh

Tytila of East Anglia
Eni of East Anglia
Anna of East Anglia	Sæwara	Æthelhere of East Anglia	Æthelwold of East Anglia	Æthelric
Eorcenberht of Kent	Seaxburh of Ely	Æthelthryth	1. Tondberht	Æthelburh	Jurmin	Wihtburh	Ealdwulf of East Anglia
2. Ecgfrith of Northumbria

== Story of the does ==
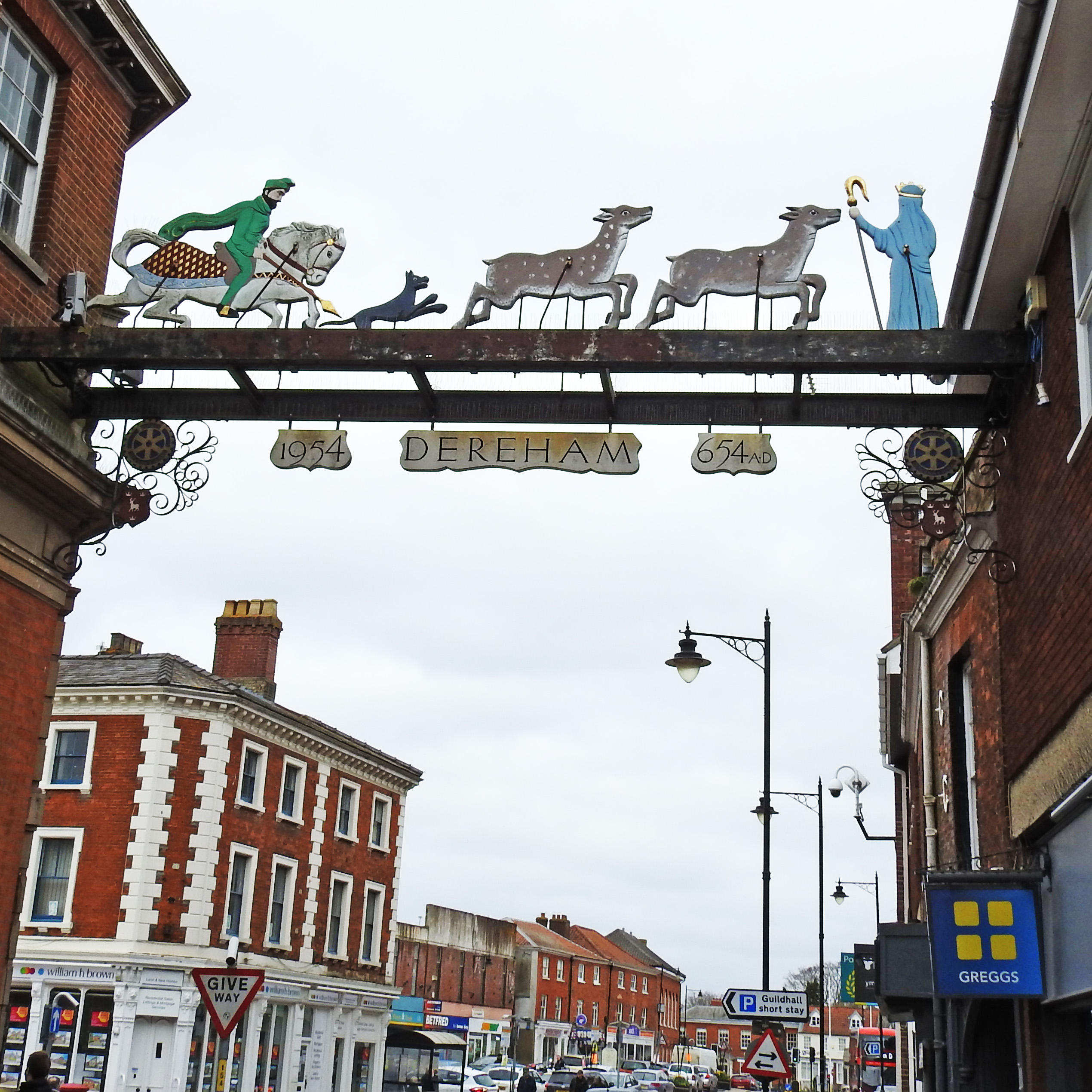
Dereham's town sign, showing the story of Wihtburh

After the death of her father in c. 653, Wihtburh built a convent in Dereham, Norfolk. In the hagiographical account of Æthelthryth's life in the Liber Eliensis, Wihtburh is said to have "voluntarily elected to live in solitude near Dereham".

A traditional story relates that while she was building the convent, she had nothing but dry bread to give to the workmen. She prayed to the Virgin Mary and was told to send her maids to a local well each morning. There they found two wild does that were gentle enough to be milked, and so provided a nutritious drink for the workers. According to the story, a local official did not approve of the miracle, and decided to hunt down the does with his dogs and prevent them from coming to be milked. He was punished for this cruelty when he was thrown from his horse and broke his neck.

The account is commemorated in the town sign in the centre of Dereham. The original sign, which was made in 1954 by Harry Carter and boys from Hamond's Grammar School, was replaced in 2004 by a fibreglass replica.

== Death and veneration at Dereham ==
Wihtburh died at a great age in 743, and was buried at Dereham. The historian Barbara Yorke has commented on this date for Wihtburh's death, stating that it is "rather late for a daughter of Anna".

Wihtburh is mentioned in the Anglo-Saxon Chronicle annal for 799, in an addition to the original text that was written after the Norman Conquest of 1066:

A.D. 799. This year Archbishop Ethelbert, and Cynbert, Bishop of Wessex, went to Rome. In the meantime Bishop Alfun died at Sudbury, and was buried at Dunwich. After him Tidfrith was elected to the see; and Siric, king of the East Saxons, went to Rome. In this year the body of Witburga was found entire, and free from decay, at Dercham, after a lapse of five and fifty years from the period of her decease.

— Anglo-Saxon Chronicle

The incorruptibility of Wihtburh's body was considered a miracle and her remains were re-interred in the church which she had built in Dereham. The church and the tomb became a place of pilgrimage. The large church at Dereham has a chapel dedicated to Wihtburh, and a plan that, according to the historian Tim Pestell, "is possibly indicative of its former status".

=== Removal to Ely ===
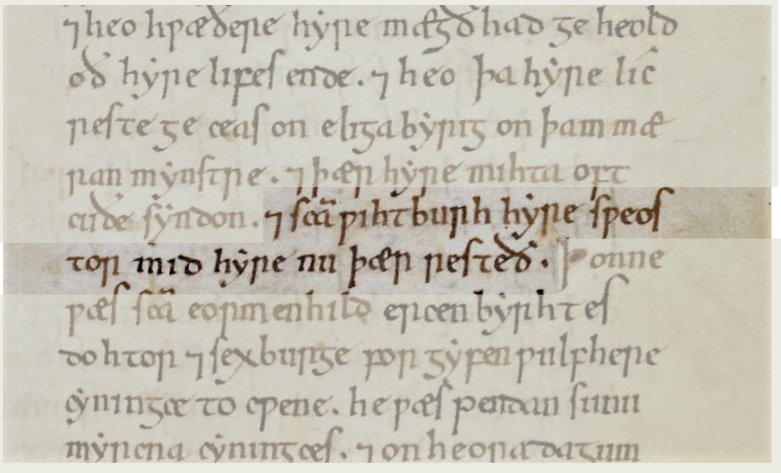
A detail from folio 36.r of MS Stowe 944 (the Hyde Register), which names the saint as being interred at Ely Cathedral near to her sisters: And Sancta Wihtburh hyre sweostor mid hyre nu þǽr resteð. (British Library)

In 974, Brithnoth, the abbot of Ely, accompanied by monks and armed men, travelled to Dereham with the intention of taking Wihtburh's body by force. They organised a feast for the townspeople as a diversion tactic. After waiting until the Dereham men were properly drunk, Brithnoth stole Wihtburh's body and set off during the night for the Isle of Ely. After discovering the theft, the people of Dereham set off after the tomb-robbers, who were attacked at Brandon by the townspeople. Using their knowledge of the Fens to evade their pursuers, Brithnoth and his men successfully reached Ely, and Wihtburh's remains were re-interred there. (Note: According to the Liber Eliensis, Wihtburh's remains were removed to Ely at the command of Edgar, King of England, who had given the manor of East Dereham to Ely "with all the things that pertained to that same town".) When the Dereham men returned home, they discovered that a spring had arisen in Wihtburh's tomb.

Saints' cults were a feature of Christianity in Anglo-Saxon England, and their remains attracted benefactions. Smaller monasteries may not have been able to resist the requests of places like Ely to acquire their relics, which accounts for the theft of the remains of Wihtburh in 974. The story of the theft, which appeared in the Liber Eliensis, was taken from an earlier Life of the saint. The abbey attempted to relate the story as an "appropriate holy sacrilege", which gave her honour, as she was being laid to rest close to the remains of her older sister, Æthelthryth.

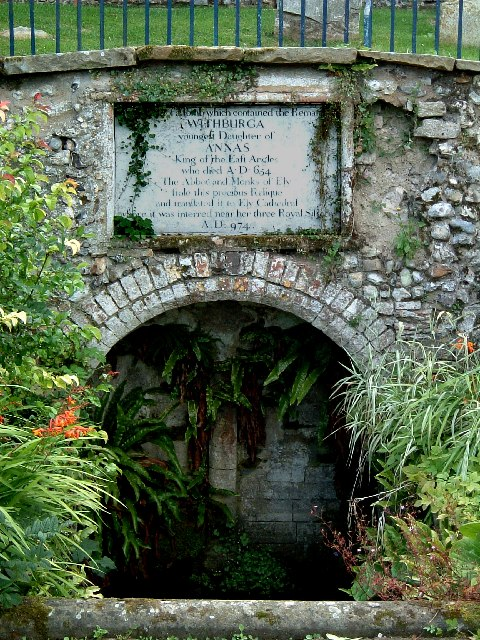
The site of Withburga's tomb in East Dereham, Norfolk

At the site of Wihtburh's tomb outside the west end of the town's parish church, there is the remains of a holy well associated with the saint, which was said to have risen on the site of her grave after her body had been stolen. Of a second spring, located further west and called Wihtburh's Well, which was recorded in the 18th century, no remains exist.

Wihtburh's interment at Ely is first recorded in the Hyde Register, an 11th-century list of the burial places of English saints. A sentence of the text of the register, now kept in the British Library as MS Stowe 944, reads: And Sancta Wihtburh hyre sweostor mid hyre nu þǽr resteð. According to the register, she was placed near Æthelthryth, Sexburga, and Ermenilda, Sexburga's daughter.

In 1106, when their remains were moved closer to the main altar, the bodies of Wihtburh and her sisters were publicly displayed before a group of bishops, abbots, and clergymen, including Anselm, Archbishop of Canterbury. It was found that the body of Æthelthryth had been preserved and that Wihtburh was so conserved but that her limbs were flexible, her cheeks were rosy, and her breasts were firm, a sign of her body's vitality, youthfulness and "burgeoning productivity".

The description of her life and miraculous incorruptibility closely follows that of Æthelthryth, who was also a virgin who founded an East Anglian monastery. According to Blanton, "the prominence of the tombs [of Wihtburh and other members of her family at Ely] demonstrated that kinship was an important ideological construct that needed to be presented visually". This, and the family's inclusion in texts such the Liber Eliensis, "indicated a complementary focus on the strength and cohesion of this holy family as the cornerstone of the monastery's history". Other documents originating from the abbey show that the cults of Wihtburh and her sisters Æthelthryth and Seaxburh formed part of what the historian Virginia Blanton describes as Ely's "ideology of kinship". Ely strove to promote and enhance itself as a place renowned for its holiness and connections with the East Anglian royal family, something that was achieved by placing the royal tombs of Wihtburh and her sisters in close proximity, and documenting that the daughters of Anna were abbesses at Ely.

The relics of the sisters were all destroyed during the Reformation; no trace of the royal tombs, including that of Wihtburh, now exists.

== Dissemination of her life story ==
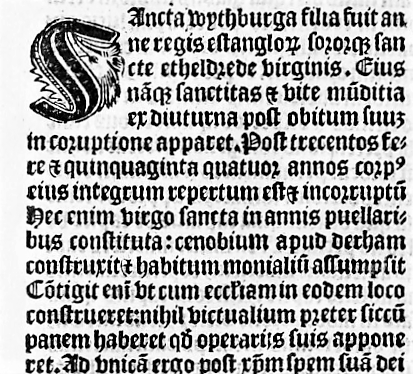
Extract from the life of Wihtburh by John of Tynemouth from his Sanctilogium Angliae (1516)

The process by which the story of Wihtburh was disseminated is not known for certain. Between 1325 and 1340, the English chronicler John of Tynemouth included the vitae of the Ely saints, including Wihtburh, in his Sanctilogium Angliae. (Note: The Sanctilogium survives in a single manuscript, now in the British Library, where it is Cotton Library MS Tiberius E.i.) The work was enlarged during the 15th century and a revised edition printed in English by Wynkyn de Worde in 1516 and translated into English by Richard Pynson the same year.

Wihtburh is included as "St Withburge" in The Lives of Women Saints of our Contrie of England, also Some Other Liues of Holie Women Written by Some of the Auncient Fathers, written during the first half of the 1610s.

The story of Wihtburh appears only to have been influential at a local level; four images depict Wihtburh (as well as Æthelthryth) on Norfolk church rood screens. According to Blanton, the depiction of the sisters together in these churches "was a result of, if not a directive of, Ely's narrative history". (Note: The parish churches in Norfolk with medieval rood screen images of Wihtburh are St Andrew's, North Burlingham, and St Peter and St Paul, Barnham Broom. The depiction of the saint at Dereham originates from St John, Oxborough. and the medieval image at Woolpit's church has been painted over in a modern restoration.) The localized concentration of images suggests that Wihtburh's cult was never large, and was closely linked with the cult associated with her more illustrious sister, Æthelthryth.

== Sources ==
- Anon. (1852). "Screen at North Burlingham". Norfolk Archaeology. 3: 20–21.
- Arnold-Forster, Frances (1899). Studies in Church Dedications: or, England's patron saints. Vol. 2. London: Skeffington & Son. OCLC 1157773694.
- Baring-Gould, Sabine (1897). The Lives Of The Saints. Vol. 3. London: John C. Nimmo. OCLC 187514575.
- Blanton, Virginia (2004). "King Anna's Daughters: Genealogical Narrative and Cult Formation in the 'Liber Eliensis'". Historical Reflections / Réflexions Historiques. 30 (1): 127–149. JSTOR 41299300.
- Browning, Stephen; Tink, Daniel (2020). Norwich and Norfolk: Stone Age to the Great War. Barnsley, UK: Pen & Sword Books Limited. ISBN 978-15267-0-845-8.
- Cruz, Joan Carroll (1977). The Incorruptibles: a Study of the Incorruption of the Bodies of Various Catholic Saints and Beati. Rockford, Illinois: Tan Books and Publishers. ISBN 978-08955-5-066-8.
- Duffy, Eamon (2014). Saints, Sacrilege and Sedition: Religion and Conflict in the Tudor Reformations. London: Bloomsbury. ISBN 978-14729-0-917-6.
- Dumville, David (1989). "Essex, Middle Anglia, and the Expansion of Mercia in the South-East Midlands". In Basset, Steven (ed.). The Origins of Anglo-Saxon Kingdoms. London: Leicester University Press. pp. 123–140. ISBN 978-0-7185-1317-7.
- Fairweather, Janet, ed. (2005). Liber Eliensis: A History of the Isle of Ely from the Seventh Century to the Twelfth, compiled by a Monk of Ely in the Twelfth Century. Woodbridge, UK: Boydell Press. ISBN 978-1-84383-015-3.
- Kelly, S. E. (2013). "Anna (d. 654?), king of the East Angles". In Goldman, Lawrence (ed.). Oxford Dictionary of National Biography (online ed.). Oxford: Oxford University Press. doi:10.1093/ref:odnb/39123. (Subscription, Wikipedia Library access or UK public library membership required.)
- Keyser, C.E. (1883). A List of Buildings in Great Britain and Ireland Having Mural and Other Painted Decorations Of Dates Prior to the Latter Part of the Sixteenth Century, with Historical Introduction and Alphabetical Index of Subjects (3rd ed.). London: South Kensington Museum.
- Lapidge, Michael (2001). The Blackwell Encyclopaedia of Anglo-Saxon England. Oxford: Blackwell. ISBN 978-0-631-22492-1.
- Pestell, Tim (2004). Landscapes of Monastic Foundation The Establishment of Religious Houses in East Anglia c.650-1200. Woodbridge, UK: Boydell Press. ISBN 978-18438-3-062-7.
- Stenton, Frank Merry (1970). Stenton, Doris Mary (ed.). Preparatory to Anglo-Saxon England: Being the Collected Papers of Frank Merry Stenton. Oxford: Clarendon Press. ISBN 978-01982-2-314-6.
- Waller, Gary (2016). Walsingham and the English Imagination. London; New York: Routledge. ISBN 978-13170-0-061-7.
- Yorke, Barbara (2002). Kings and Kingdoms of Early Anglo-Saxon England. London and New York: Routledge. ISBN 978-0-415-16639-3.
