= Eorcengota =

7th-century Kentish princess, nun and saint

Saint Eorcengota
- Born: Kingdom of Kent
- Residence: Faremoutiers
- Died: Faremoutiers Abbey, France
- Venerated in: Catholic Church, Anglicanism, Eastern Orthodox Church
- Feast: 7 July (Western Christianity); 21 February (Eastern Orthodoxy)

Saint Eorcengota or Ercongotha was a 7th-century Kentish princess and nun at Faremoutiers Abbey who is venerated as a saint in the Christian church. She is known for her deathbed vision in which she supposedly predicted her own death.

== Family ==
Eorcengota was the daughter of King Eorcenberht of Kent and St. Seaxburh of Ely, and was the sister of King Ecgberht of Kent, King Hlothhere of Kent and Saint Ermenilda of Ely. Her family was heavily involved with promoting Christianity; her paternal grandfather Eadbald of Kent had been the first Anglo-Saxon king to convert, and her father had ordered stricter Christian practices across his kingdom and the destruction of pagan idols.

== Life ==
Not much is known about Eorcengota's life, but she was sent by her father to Faremoutiers Abbey in Brie, France, to serve as a nun due to the lack of monasteries in England at the time. Her maternal step aunt Saint Sæthryth and aunt Saint Æthelburh of Faremoutiers both served as abbess at the abbey.

The monk Bede wrote about Eorcengota's purity and piety, and that she foretold her own death. Upon her deathbed, she claimed to have received a vision of men dressed in white entering the abbey. When questioned by Eorcengota about the purpose of the visit, they replied that they had come to collect the aureum illud nomisna (golden coin) that had been taken from Kent to the monastery, with the coin representing Eorcengota herself. At the time, metal coins were rare, considered prized objects of great significance, and used as jewellery. In addition, starting at the beginning of the seventh century, some of the first English coins had started to be minted in her native Kent.

Her Catholic feast day is 7 July, while her Eastern Orthodox day is commemorated on 21 February.
