= Liber Eliensis =

12th-century English chronicle

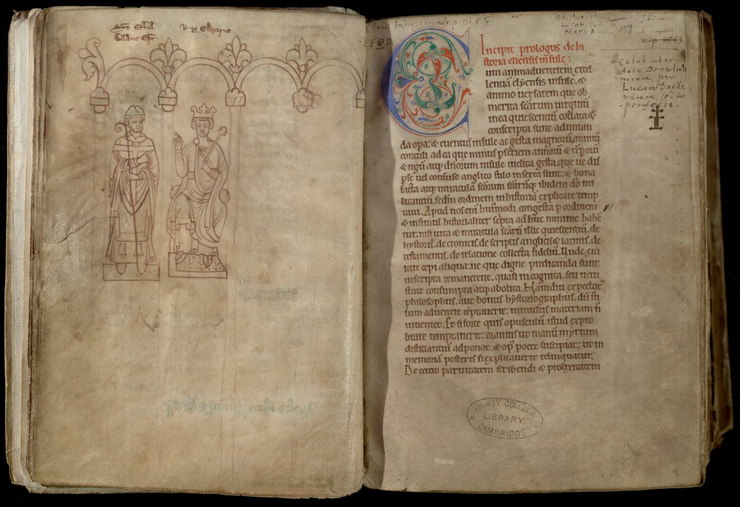
- Trinity College, Cambridge MS O.2.1
- Also known as: Book of Ely; Historia Eliensis
- Author(s): Unknown
- Ascribed to: Thomas or Richard, monks of Ely
- Language: Medieval Latin
- Date: Early through second-quarter 12th century
- Provenance: Ely Abbey
- Manuscript(s): Trinity College, Cambridge MS O.2.1 (E); Ely Cathedral Chapter (F); British Library MS Cotton Titus A.i (G); British Library Cotton Domitian MS A.xv (B); British Library MS Cotton Vespasian A.xix (A)
- Genre: Chronicle
- Subject: Account of the history of Ely Abbey and the Bishopric of Ely
- Sources: Æthelwold of Winchester's Libellus; Bede's Ecclesiastical History of the English People; Florence of Worcester's Chronicon ex chronicis among others

The Liber Eliensis (Note: Sometimes Historia Eliensis or Book of Ely) is a 12th-century English chronicle and history, written in Latin. Composed in three books, it was written at Ely Abbey on the island of Ely in the fenlands of eastern Cambridgeshire. Ely Abbey became the cathedral of a newly formed bishopric in 1109. Traditionally, the author of the anonymous work has been given as Richard or Thomas, two monks at Ely, one of whom, Richard, has been identified with an official of the monastery, but some historians hold that neither Richard nor Thomas was the author.

The Liber covers the period from the founding of the abbey in 673 until the middle of the 12th century, building on earlier historical works. It incorporates documents and stories of saints' lives. The work typifies a type of local history produced during the latter part of the 12th century. Similar books were written at other English monasteries. The longest of the contemporary local histories, the Liber chronicles the devastation that the Anarchy caused during the reign of King Stephen. It also documents the career of Nigel, the Bishop of Ely from 1133 to 1169, and his disputes with King Stephen. Other themes include the miracles worked by the monastery's patron saint, Æthelthryth, and gifts of land to Ely.

Two complete manuscripts survive, complemented by partial manuscripts. The Latin text was published in 1962, and an English translation followed in 2005. Extracts had appeared in print earlier.

The Liber Eliensis provides an important history of the region and period it covers, particularly for the abbey and bishopric of Ely.

== Background and authorship ==
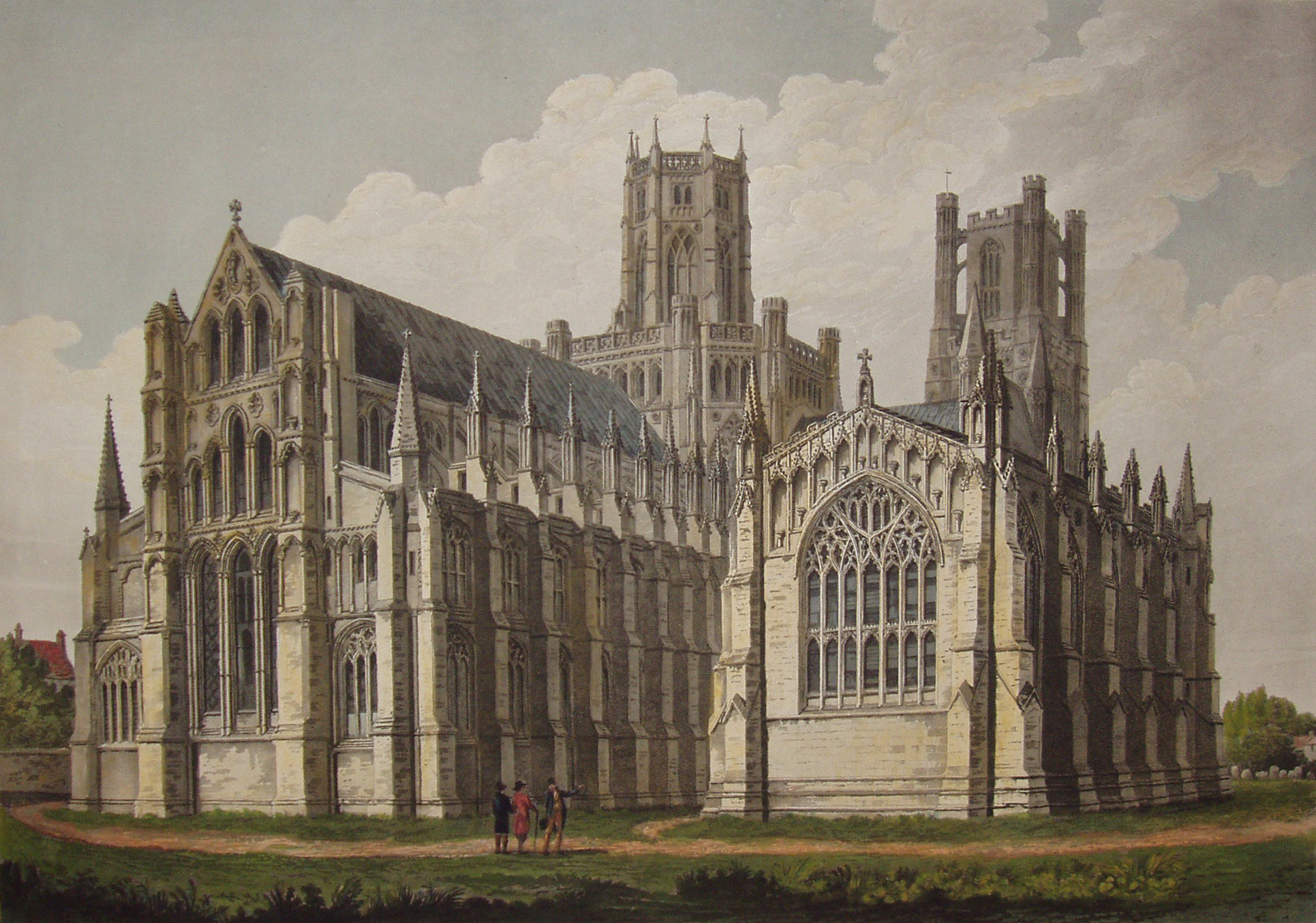
Early 19th-century print of Ely Cathedral, where the Liber Eliensis was produced

The Liber Eliensis was written at Ely Abbey, which became Ely Cathedral upon conversion into a bishopric in 1109. The historian Elisabeth van Houts believes that it was written in two stages: first under Bishop Hervey le Breton, in office from 1109 to 1133; and continued under Bishop Geoffrey Ridel, who served from 1173 to 1189. For van Houts, the first stage was the translation of an Old English work into Latin, commissioned by Bishop Hervey. The rest of the work, van Houts argues, was composed in the 1170s. However, E. O. Blake, who edited the first Latin printing of the work, concludes that the Liber was probably composed in three parts, based on its contents; the first book of the Liber was begun after 1131, when one of the sources used in the Liber was completed. The second has a preface apologising for the delay in its completion, and could not have been started before 1154, as it records events from that year. The third and final book was completed between 1169, when Bishop Nigel died and whose death is mentioned in the book, and 1174, when a new bishop was appointed. As there is no mention of Nigel's replacement, Blake states that this suggests that book three was finished before the new bishop took office.

Traditionally, the work was ascribed to either Thomas or Richard, two monks of Ely mentioned in the text. The historian Antonia Gransden is inclined to believe that the work is by Richard, who is usually identified with the Richard who was recorded as sub-prior and prior of Ely, holding the latter office from 1177 until some time between 1189 and 1194. Blake thinks that Richard was the author, but he considers the evidence to be inconclusive. Janet Fairweather, a classicist and a recent translator of the Liber, suggests that it may have been written by someone other than the traditional candidates. Whoever the author, the Liber specifically states that it was written at the bidding of some members of the monastic community at Ely.

The Liber is one of a number of monastic histories written during the middle and later 12th century, when a number of monasteries in northern and southern England produced works devoted to recording the histories of their religious houses and local areas. In the south, these included the Historia Ecclesie Abbendonensis of Abingdon Abbey, the Chronicon Abbatiae Rameseiensis of Ramsey Abbey, the Chronicon Angliae Petriburgense of Peterborough Abbey, a history of the see of Bath and Wells, and the Chronicon Monasterii de Bello of Battle Abbey. The northern histories record the foundation stories of the various Cistercian houses in the north, along with other information relating to those houses. Those from the south, including the Liber Eliensis, mainly concern themselves with the various controversies involving their respective religious houses. The northern histories are less concerned with controversy, and overall are more prone to hagiography.

== Sources ==
To a large extent, the work is composite; that is, it is a compilation borrowing from or at least using earlier sources. These include the early medieval writer Bede's Ecclesiastical History of the English People, a chronicle that was associated with Bede's De temporum ratione, the Chronicon ex chronicis, and William of Poitiers' Gesta Guillelmi II ducis Normannorum. Lesser-used sources include the Anglo-Saxon Chronicle, Orderic Vitalis' Historia Ecclesiastica, Stephen of Ripon's Vita Sancti Wilfrithi, William of Malmesbury's Gesta pontificum Anglorum, a list of the kings of Wessex, the Old English poem The Battle of Maldon, and a number of saints' lives, including some written by Eadmer, Felix, Abbo of Fleury, Goscelin, and Osbern of Canterbury. The work on Maldon was included because the hero of the work was Byrhtnoth, a patron of the monastery.

Works more directly related to Ely were also used. The primary one of these works was Bishop Æthelwold of Winchester's Libellus, large parts of which were copied into the Liber Eliensis. Also incorporated into the Liber was an earlier Vita, or saints' life, on Æthelthryth, the founder and first abbess of Ely. A work on the benefactors of the abbey was also used, and the material from three surviving cartularies. These documents were translated from their original Old English into Latin by the compiler. Another source, as related in the Liber itself, was a work about Hereward the Wake written by a brother monk known as Richard. Modern historians have identified it with the Gesta Herwardi known from a 13th-century manuscript. It is, however, unclear whether the compiler of the Liber used the exact text of the Gesta as it has come down to us, or a different, earlier manuscript.

Some of these sources may originally have been oral works. A number of the stories in the narrative parts of the Liber resemble Scandinavian sagas, including the story about King Cnut visiting the monastery and singing an Anglo-Saxon song to the assembled monks. It is possible that the information on Hereward and Byrhtnoth originally came from orally transmitted tales that were written down.

== Contents ==
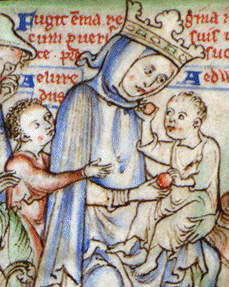
A 13th-century representation of Emma of Normandy, whose benefactions to Ely were recorded in the Liber

The work is traditionally divided into three books. Along with the history in Book I, the first section also contains a prologue and a preface. It discusses the founding of the Abbey of Ely and the background of the foundress, Æthelthryth. The first book also deals with the history of the abbey and its abbesses until the Danish invasions of the 9th century. A description of the destruction of the abbey by the Danes and of King Edgar's (reigned 959–975) rule concludes the book. The second book, Book II, begins with the restoration of the abbey during Edgar's reign, under Bishop Æthelwold. Accounts of the subsequent abbots until the last, Richard, are included in Book II, as well as numerous charters and other documents. The final book, Book III, contains information on the conversion of the abbey to a bishopric, and on the first few bishops; it concludes with a description of the martyrdom of Thomas Becket. Interspersed with the historical narrative are a number of documents and charters relating to the bishops.

The work also depicts the devastation that the Anarchy caused during King Stephen's reign. The chronicler states that failure of the harvest and pillaging caused a famine. The work describes the area around the abbey for 20–30 miles (32–48 kilometres) as being filled with unburied corpses, and that the price of a bushel of grain rose to 200 pence. The long descriptions of Nigel of Ely's disputes with King Stephen lead to a discussion of the Battle of Lincoln and other matters not directly related to Ely. The Liber gives a detailed account of Nigel's career, although in general the chronicle's author favours Stephen over his own bishop. The ascension of King Henry II to the English throne is considered to be an excellent event, and the Liber praises the new king.

An important part of the work was devoted to the miracles and glorification of Ely's patroness, Saint Æthelthryth. The very beginning of the work incorporates an earlier Vita, or Life, of Æthelthryth, which resembles the Vitae of other saints written by Goscelin in the 11th century; Goscelin is known to have visited Ely. The work may have helped to increase the number of pilgrims visiting Ely, as well as enabling the monks to better explain the history of earlier donations to the abbey. Many of the gifts to the abbey church are described, such as the altar cloth donated by Queen Emma (died 1052), wife of both King Æthelred II (died 1016) and King Cnut (died 1035), with a short history of the circumstances of the gift. The miracle stories frequently say that those who wished cures or miracles similar to those in the Liber would need to come to the monastery, where they could make a donation. The historian Jennifer Paxton argues that increasing pilgrimage to the monastery was one of the main goals of the compilers of the Liber.

Another concern of the chronicle was the acquisition of land by the abbey. The work incorporates three pre-existing inventories of the abbey's possessions and records each gift to the abbey, giving the grantor and occasionally details of the grantor's life. This detailed record of the various rights and possessions of the abbey was useful if those possessions needed to be defended against outside or inside conflicts. The Liber was used by the monks to defend their claims to be the real heirs of the abbey's rights and property rather than the bishops, after the conversion of the abbey into a bishopric. The chronicle also records the division of property between the monks and the newly appointed bishop. According to the chronicler, the division took place during the episcopate of the first bishop, Hervey le Breton, and was characterised as barely adequate for the needs of the monks. Later, the chronicle records documents from the bishops that defined the separation between the monks and the episcopate. The chronicle also records the conflict between the abbey and various Bishops of Lincoln, which had continued until the abbey became a bishopric in 1109.

A third theme of the work is the stress on the importance and number of distinguished burials that took place at Ely. They would have increased the desire of others to be buried there, which would have benefited the community by the donations that would have flowed from those wishing to secure their burial. The Liber stresses the burials of Æthelstan, a Bishop of Elmham, that of Ælfwine, another Bishop of Elmham, and Wulfstan, an Archbishop of York.

== Influence ==
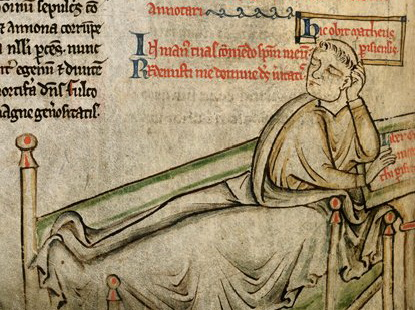
The medieval chronicler, Matthew Paris, shown here in a 13th-century manuscript depiction of his deathbed, used the Liber as a source for his works.

The Liber was familiar to the 13th-century chronicler Matthew Paris, who used it along with the Chronicon Abbatiae Rameseiensis of Ramsey Abbey in his own historical works. Another 13th-century English writer, Roger of Wendover, was also aware of the Liber.

Some of the information contained in the Liber is important to historians. It is in the Liber that the first statement that Æthelwold translated the Benedictine Rule into Old English is made. The Liber is the longest of the local histories produced in England during the 12th century, and it contains a description of the royal chancery, which might be the earliest evidence for the existence of that office in the Anglo-Saxon kingdom. The Liber describes how King Edgar (died 975) granted the abbey the office of chancellor (head of the chancery), but the authenticity of the passage is unclear. The existence of a formal chancery office in Anglo-Saxon England before the Norman Conquest is a matter of some debate amongst historians.

The historian Dorothy Whitelock says of the work that it is "unique among post-Conquest monastic histories". It was written to help buttress the claims of Ely to a judicial liberty, or the exercise of all the royal rights within a hundred. To do this, the Liber collected together earlier sources used to help the abbey evade episcopal control, prior to the abbey becoming a bishopric. These documents may have been forged or had their contents doctored to help the abbey's cause. Because of the tendentious nature of the collection, the work is used by historians with great caution. Despite the untrustworthy nature of the Liber and the documents preserved therein, it remains a valuable source for the history of the time period it covers, as well as the internal history of the abbey and bishopric. The historian Antonia Gransden characterises the Liber as "valuable for general history", but qualifies by saying that "the whole lacks unity and has errors and confusing repetitions".

== Manuscripts ==
The work survives in two complete manuscripts (MS), that of Trinity College, Cambridge MS O.2.1, usually known as the E manuscript, and one in the possession of Ely Cathedral Chapter, usually known as the F manuscript. The E manuscript dates from the late 12th century, and shows three different scribal hands. (Note: The manuscript is on vellum on 256 folios in a single column with initials in green and red ink. Besides the Liber, the manuscript also has 14 folios at the front which are unnumbered and consist of a Calendar of saints and a list of bishops and abbots of Ely. Then follow the folios with the Liber itself, numbered 1–177. The last parts of the manuscript contains the Inquisitio Eliensis and short vitae on the saints Ædelberga, Ærcongota, Ærmenilda, Sexburga, Werburga, and Wihtburga.) The F manuscript dates to the early 13th century, with four scribal hands. (Note: This manuscript is on vellum also and consists of 190 folios, numbered 1–188 as two folio numbers have been used twice. The text is in two columns with initial letters mainly in green and red, with some in blue. The first folio is not part of the Liber and consists of notes on various subjects, including the confessors buried at Ely and the rights of the convent on the Isle of Ely. Folios 2–188v are the Liber proper, which is followed by a charter from around 1200 and a note from the 15th century.) The E manuscript was given to Trinity College as part of the Gale Collection by Roger Gale in 1738. The F manuscript has remained at Ely since its creation, and is the only manuscript at Ely still remaining from the medieval monastic library.

As well as the two complete manuscripts, a number of other manuscripts contain parts of the whole work. British Library MS Cotton Titus A.i, usually known as the G manuscript, has part of Book II, and dates from the late 12th or early 13th century. British Library MS Cotton Domitian A.xv, known as the B manuscript, dates from the late 13th or early 14th century and includes some other material along with Book I and the same parts of Book II as in manuscript G. Another Cottonian manuscript, British Library MS Cotton Vespasian A.xix, has parts of Book III, and dates to between 1257 and 1286. This manuscript is usually known as the A manuscript.

The relationship between the various extant manuscripts is complex, and a definitive scheme of how the various manuscripts relate to each other cannot be made. Blake, in his edition of the Liber, suggests that Book I once existed as a stand-alone work, which influenced the B manuscript. A separate Book II, with parts of Book III, was then written and combined with the stand-alone Book I, into either manuscript E or an earlier version of that manuscript. Book II was then revised, combined with parts of G, Book I, and parts of E to make manuscript F.

Related manuscripts include Bodleian Library Oxford MS Laud 647, known as the O manuscript. (Note: This manuscript is also on vellum in 188 folios in double columned text. The initials alternate in red and blue ink and are elaborately decorated. The actual Liber takes up folios 3–177v in this manuscript.) This is based on the Liber, but reorganised into a listing of the acts of the various abbots and bishops and dates from the 14th century. Blake, in his edition of the Liber, calls that and related works the Chronicon Abbatum et Episcoporum Eliensium. Another related work is contained in Trinity College, Cambridge MS O.2.41, which contains the Libellus of Æthelwold and an Ely cartulary. Two other related works containing just cartularies are British Library Cotton MS Tiberius A vi and Cambridge University Library Ely Diocesan Register Liber M.

== Publication ==
Liber Eliensis has been published by the Royal Historical Society in its Camden Third Series, edited by E. O. Blake. The edition contains the Latin text along with some Old English texts, but no translation. Janet Fairweather has produced a recent English translation of the Latin, published in 2005 by Boydell & Brewer.

Formerly, only sections of the Liber had appeared in print, without translations. Parts of the Liber were edited by D. J. Stewart and published by the Anglia Christiana Society in 1848. Other extracts were published in various works, including parts of Book I that were included in Volume 2 of Jean Mabillon's nine-volume Acta Sanctorum, printed between 1688 and 1701. Another set of extracts, mainly consisting of parts of Book II, was compiled by Roger Gale's father Thomas Gale, as part of his Historicae Britannicae Scriptores XV, published at Oxford in 1691.

=== Editions ===
- Blake, E. O., ed. (1962). Liber Eliensis. Camden Third Series. London: Royal Historical Society. OCLC 462668616.
- Fairweather, Janet (trans.), ed. (2005). Liber Eliensis. Woodbridge, UK: Boydell Press. ISBN 978-1-84383-015-3.
