= Goscelin =

Benedictine hagiographical writer

Goscelin of Saint-Bertin (or Goscelin of Canterbury, born c. 1040, died in or after 1106) was a Benedictine hagiographical writer. He was a Fleming or Brabantian by birth and became a monk of St Bertin's at Saint-Omer before travelling to England to take up a position in the household of Herman, Bishop of Ramsbury in Wiltshire (1058–78). During his time in England, he stayed at many monasteries and wherever he went collected materials for his numerous hagiographies of English saints.

== Life ==
=== Flanders ===
Goscelin of Saint-Bertin was born about 1040. According to William of Malmesbury, Goscelin was a monk of St Bertin's. On the other hand, as the author of the Vita Amalbergae virginis, written before 1062, Goscelin appears to be very well informed about the hagiographic tradition in Flanders and Brabant, more especially traditions related to Saint Peter's Abbey of Ghent. He probably stayed there at some time before 1062.

=== England ===
According to William of Malmesbury, Goscelin arrived in England with Herman, bishop of Sherborne, who arrived in 1058. But, William of Malmesbury mistakenly claims that this was the year in which Herman became bishop of Sherborne, an appointment he did not take up until the death of Sherborne's resident bishop Ælfwold in 1062–65. It is doubtful, therefore, that his information about Goscelin's arrival is reliable. In fact, Goscelin states, himself, in his Liber confortatorius, that 'he first came to the bishop' at Potterne or Canning (in Wiltshire), implying that he did not travel to England in his company, but joined him there instead. It used to be thought that he arrived before the Norman Conquest, but there is no evidence for this supposition, although it is possible.

Goscelin's patron and companion was Herman, Bishop of Sherborne. He functioned as secretary to the bishop and as chaplain to the nuns of Wilton Abbey. His fortunes took a turn for the worse when Bishop Herman died in 1078 and was succeeded by Osmund of Sées, whom Goscelin in his Liber confortatorius describes as a "king who knew not Joseph". In the early 1080s, he was at Peterborough. Later, he wrote hagiography for the monastic communities of Ely, Barking, Ramsey, and St Augustine's, Canterbury, among other places.

Goscelin is last recorded as the author of a life of St Wihtburh of Ely, completed following her translation in 1106.

== Writing ==
William of Malmesbury praises his industry in the highest terms. He was at Ely sometime after 1082, where he wrote a life of St Æthelthryth. Between 1087 and 1091 he was at Ramsey, and compiled there a life of the abbot St Ivo, or Ives. In the 1090s, he went to Canterbury, where he wrote his account of the translation of the relics of St Augustine and his companions, which had taken place in 1091. He wrote it in the octave year after that event, i.e. in 1098-99, and dedicated the work to St Anselm. A Canterbury obituary, quoted by Henry Wharton in Anglia Sacra, gives 15 May as the day of death of a certain Goscelin, who may have been this man, but does not name the year. His works consist of the lives of many English saints, chiefly of those connected with Canterbury, where he spent his last years. Some of them have been printed by the Bollandists, by Jean Mabillon, and by Jacques-Paul Migne. Others are contained in manuscripts in the British Museum and at Cambridge. His chief work was a life of St Augustine of Canterbury, professing to be based on older records and divided into two parts, -- an "Historia major" (Mabillon, Acta Sactorum. O.S.B., I) and an "Historia minor" (in Wharton, Anglia Sacra, I). His method seems to have been usually to take some older writer as his basis and to reproduce his work, in his own style.

The Liber Confortatorius dedicated to Eve of Wilton, a former pupil who went to Angers to live as a recluse, is a "letter of consolation", offering spiritual advice to Eve in her new vocation and conveying Goscelin's feelings about her sudden departure. One commentator feels that it reads like a private, even erotic, letter.

According to William of Malmesbury, Goscelin was also a skilled musician.

== Works ==
=== Flanders (St Peter's Abbey, Ghent) ===
- 1055–62: Vita S. Amalbergae virginis (ed. J.B. Sollerius, Acta Sanctorum mensis Julii III (1723) 90–102).

Also on Wikisource (in Latin)

=== Sherborne and Wilton (Wessex) ===
- 1060s or 1070s?: Life of St Eadwold of Cerne, ed. Tom Licence, "Goscelin of Saint-Bertin and the Hagiography of Eadwold of Cerne", in: Journal of Medieval Latin 2006; 16
- Shortly after 1078: Life of St Wulfsige (of Sherborne), ed. C.H. Talbot, "The life of Saint Wulsin of Sherborne by Goscelin." Revue Bénédictine 69 (1959): 68–85; tr. Rosalind C. Love (2005). "The Life of St Wulfsige of Sherborne by Goscelin of Saint-Bertin: A New Translation with Introduction, Appendix and Notes". In Katherine Barker, David A Hinton and Alan Hunt (ed.). St Wulfsige and Sherborne: Essays to Celebrate the Millennium of the Benedictine Abbey, 998-1998. Oxford. pp. 98–123.
- Between 1080–82: Liber confortatorius, ed. Stephanie Hollis, Writing the Wilton Women: Goscelin's Legend of Edith and Liber Confortatorius. Medieval Women Texts and Contexts 9. Turnhout: Brepols, 2004; ed. C.H. Talbot, The Liber confortatorius of Goscelin of Saint Bertin. 1955. 1–117; tr. Monika Otter, Goscelin of St Bertin. Book of Encouragement and Consolation (Liber Confortatorius). Library of Medieval Women. Cambridge, 2004.
- Life of St Edith (of Wilton), ed. Stephanie Hollis, Writing the Wilton Women: Goscelin’s Legend of Edith and Liber Confortatorius. Medieval Women Texts and Contexts 9. Turnhout: Brepols, 2004.

=== East Anglia ===
- 1087–91: "Life and Miracles of St Ivo", ed. W. D. Macray, Chronicon Abbatiae Rameseiensis. London, 1886. lix-lxxxiv.
- 1080s–1106: Lives of female saints of Ely, ed. and tr. Rosalind C. Love, Goscelin of Saint-Bertin. The Hagiography of the Female Saints of Ely. OMT. Oxford, 2004.
  - "Life of St Æthelthryth", lost (one may compare the Miracula S. Ætheldrethe and Vita S. Ætheldrethe in Love's edition).
  - Vita et translatio S. Wihtburge "Life and Translation of St Wihtburh"
  - Lectiones in festivitate S. Sexburge, "The Lesson on the Feast of St Seaxburh. Compare Vita S. Sexburge in Love's edition.
  - Lectiones in natalis S. Eormenhilde "Lessons on the anniversary feast of St Eormenhild" (daughter of Seaxburh).
  - "Life of St Waerburh" daughter of Eormenhild; edited also by Carl Hostmann and translated by Henry Bradshaw, The Life of Saint Werburge of Chester. EETS. London, 1887.

=== Barking Abbey (Essex) ===
- After 1087: Lives of the female saints of Barking Abbey, ed. M.L. Colker, "Texts of Jocelyn of Canterbury which relate to the history of Barking Abbey." Studia Monastica 7.2 (1965). 383–460.
  - "Life and Miracles of St Wulfhild" (pp. 418–34)
  - "Life of St Æthelburh"
  - "Life of St Hildelith"

=== St Augustine's, Canterbury ===
- 1090s:Historia maior
- 1090s: Historia minor
- Liber de miraculis S. Augustini and Historia translationis S. Augustini, ed. Patrologia Latina 80 (1850). 43–94, 485–520. On a miracle which occurred in relation to the translation of the relics of St Augustine of Canterbury, and the monastic goldsmith Spearhafoc.
- Vita S. Laurentii (Laurence of Canterbury)
- Vita et miracula S. Melliti
- Vita S. Iusti
- Vita S. Honorii
- Vita S. Deusdedit
- Vita S. Theodori
- Vita, translatio et miraculi Adriani
- Vita et miraculi S. Letardi

=== Kentish Lives ===
- "Life of St Mildrith (of Minster-in-Thanet)", ed. D.W. Rollason, "Goscelin of Canterbury's account of the translation and miracles of St Mildrith (BHL 5961/4). An edition with notes." Mediaeval Studies 1986; 48 : 139–210; ed. Rollason, The Mildrith Legend. A Study of Early Medieval Hagiography in England. Leicester, 1982. 105–43 (based on MS BHL 5960).

In addition, many other Lives have been ascribed to Goscelin, e.g. those of St Grimbald and St Mildburg, but many such cases now prove unlikely or unsatisfactory. The Vita S. Swithuni (life of St Swithun) has traditionally been attributed to Goscelin, but Michael Lapidge has shown that this is incorrect.
