= Ivo of Ramsey =

Medieval Christian saint

Saint Ivo of Ramsey
- Born: Cornwall
- Venerated in: Roman Catholic Church; Eastern Orthodox Church
- Major shrine: Ramsey Abbey
- Feast: 24 April
- Patronage: St Ives

Saint Ivo (also known as Ives) was a Cornish bishop and hermit, and became the eponymous saint of St Ives, Huntingdonshire.

== History ==
The discovery of Bishop Ivo's remains in 1001 was first mentioned briefly in John of Worcester's Chronicon ex chronicis. He appears in the historical sources in 1001/2 when a peasant allegedly found his coffin while ploughing at Slepe (later renamed St Ives). The body appeared to be invested with the insignia of a bishop. According to an account by Goscelin of St Bertin, St Ivo appeared to the ploughman in several visions, which obliged him to communicate the discovery to the abbot's reeve. The latter did not take this seriously at first, whereupon the saint also appeared to him in visions. When the monastic community learned of this, they rejoiced greatly at the discovery.

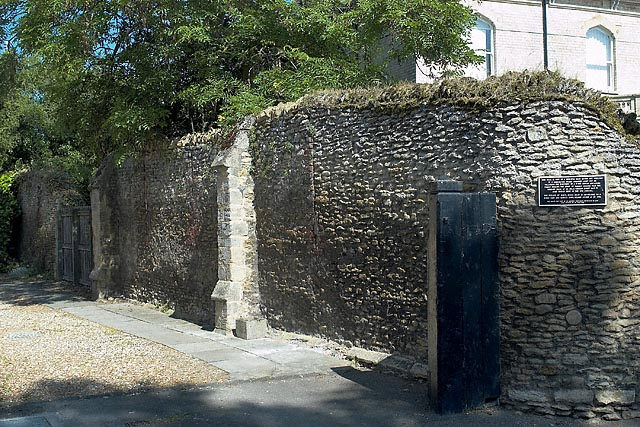
St Ives Priory Well

The Abbot of Ramsey, Eadnoth the Younger, built a church in Ivo's honor near the site. The neighbouring village with market rights was renamed St Ives. On 24 April 1002 Abbot Eadnoth translated Ivo's body, along with two of his companions, to the mother house at Ramsey. The church was expanded in 1017 into a Benedictine priory dependent on Ramsey, providing Slepe as well as part of Elsworth and Knapworth as endowment. In the 12th century the celebration of Ivo's memorial day was customarily observed in the cathedral at Exeter. The parish of St Ive in Cornwall and belonging to Trebeigh, and its church, are also attributed to Ivo.

Ivo was a Cornish saint. Rumours of a Persian link came about when Withman, Abbot of Ramsey, heard in the Holy Land of a Persian bishop named Ivo; subsequently the link to the Fenland Ivo was written down by Goscelin of St Bertin. The tradition is completely spurious.

It is possible that Saint Ivo is a male double of Saint Neot, a suggestion made by historian Cyril Hart on the basis of the strangeness of two Cornish saints so close together far away in eastern England. Saint Neot turned up in Huntingdonshire around 1000 as well.
