= Wynthryth =

Medieval saint

Wynthryth of March was an early medieval saint of Anglo Saxon England.

She is known to history from the Secgan Hagiography and The Confraternity Book of St Gallen. Very little is known of her life or career. However, she was associated with the town of March, Cambridgeshire, and she may have been a relative of King Ethelstan.

== See also ==
- Wendreda
