= Virginia Blanton =

American academic

- Education: Southwestern College (BA); Binghamton University (MA, PhD)
- Occupation: Professor

Virginia Blanton is Curators' Distinguished Professor of English Language and Literature at the University of Missouri–Kansas City and eminent scholar in Early English Studies.

== Life ==
She graduated from Southwestern College, with a B.A. in English and Foreign Languages in 1989; from Binghamton University with a M.A. in English in 1991, and Ph.D. in English in 1998. She also holds an interdisciplinary Graduate Certificate in Medieval Studies from the Center for Medieval and Renaissance Studies at Binghamton University, 1995.

Her scholarly work has re-shaped conceptions of female spirituality in the early Middle Ages. Particularly in her work on saints' lives, Blanton has demonstrated that the lives of female saints such as Æthelthryth and their later cults offer powerful insights into the devotional lives of men and women in the Middle Ages. Her first book, Signs of Devotion: The Cult of St. Æthelthryth in Medieval England, 695–1615 received the Best First Book award from the Society for Medieval Feminist Scholarship in 2008. Blanton's later work focusses on the role of nuns in medieval book production and manuscript culture.

== Works ==
- Signs of Devotion: The Cult of St. Æthelthryth in Medieval England, 695-1615. Penn State Press, 2007, ISBN 978-0-271-04798-0; paperback, 2010, ISBN 978-0-271-05869-6.
- V. Blanton, H. Scheck (eds.) Intertexts: Studies in Anglo-Saxon Culture Presented to Paul E. Szarmach, Medieval and Renaissance Texts and Studies, 2008, ISBN 978-0-86698-382-2.
- V. Blanton, V. O'Mara, P. Stoop (eds.) Nuns' Literacies in Medieval Europe: The Hull Dialogue, Brepols, 2013, ISBN 978-2-503-53972-0.
- V. Blanton, V. O'Mara, P. Stoop (eds.) Nuns' Literacies in Medieval Europe: The Kansas City Dialogue, Brepols, 2015, ISBN 978-2-503-54922-4.
- V. Blanton, V. O'Mara, P. Stoop (eds.) Nuns' Literacies in Medieval Europe: The Antwerp Dialogue, Brepols, 2017, ISBN 978-2-503-55411-2.
- V. O'Mara, V. Blanton Saints’ Lives for Medieval English Nuns, I: A Study of the ‘Lyves and Dethes’ in Cambridge University Library, MS Additional 2604 Brepols, 2023. ISBN 978-2-503-54551-6.
- V. O'Mara, V. Blanton (eds.) Saints’ Lives for Medieval English Nuns, II: An Edition of the ‘Lyves and Dethes’ in Cambridge University Library, MS Additional 2604 , Brepols, 2024. ISBN 978-2-503-60783-2.
