= Faremoutiers =

- Commune
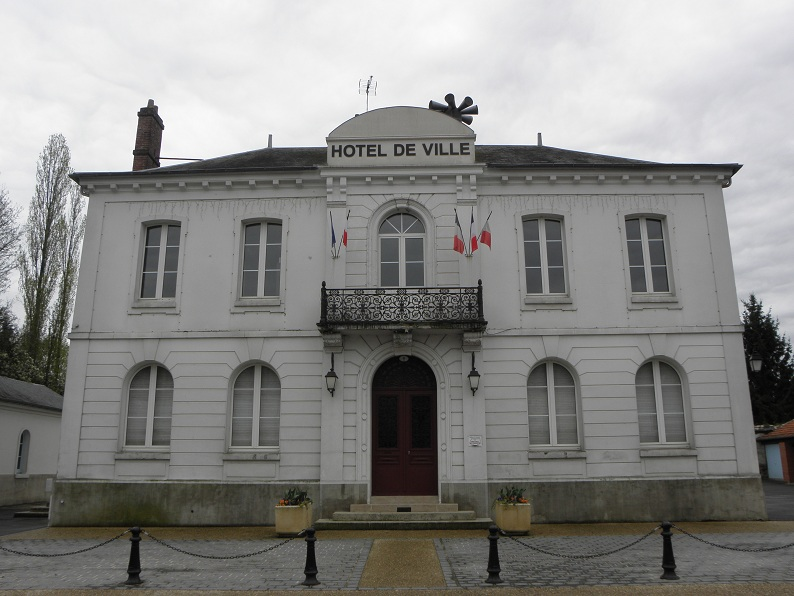
- The town hall in Faremoutiers

- Coat of arms
- Location of Faremoutiers
- Location within France Location within Île-de-France (region)
- Coordinates: 48°47′58″N 2°59′49″E
- Country: France
- Region: Île-de-France
- Department: Seine-et-Marne
- Arrondissement: Meaux
- Canton: Fontenay-Trésigny
- Intercommunality: CA Coulommiers Pays de Brie

Government
  - Mayor (2020–2026): Nicolas Caux
- Area^{1}: 10.93 km^{2} (4.22 sq mi)
- Highest elevation: 132 m (433 ft)
- Lowest elevation: 89 m (292 ft)
- Population (2023): 3,057
  - Density: 279.7/km^{2} (724.4/sq mi)
- Time zone: UTC+01:00 (CET)
  - Summer (DST): UTC+02:00 (CEST)
- INSEE/Postal code: 77176 /77515
- ^{1} French Land Register data, which excludes lakes, ponds, glaciers > 1 km^{2} (0.386 sq mi or 247 acres) and river estuaries.

Faremoutiers (French pronunciation: [faʁmutje]) is a commune in the Seine-et-Marne department in the Île-de-France region in north-central France.

== History ==
Originally named Evoriacum, Faremoutiers was renamed in honour of Saint Fara, who founded the double Abbey of Faremoutiers there in the 620s. It lies in the historical region of Brie.

The patron saint of the village is another 7th-century abbess, Æthelburh of Faremoutiers, daughter of King Anna of East Anglia in the UK.

== Population ==
Historical population
Year	Pop.	±% p.a.
1968	1,088	—
1975	1,248	+1.98%
1982	1,461	+2.28%
1990	1,849	+2.99%
1999	2,287	+2.39%
2007	2,402	+0.62%
2012	2,496	+0.77%
2017	2,822	+2.49%
2023	3,057	+1.34%
Source: INSEE

Inhabitants of Faremoutiers are called Faremontais in French.

== See also ==
- Communes of the Seine-et-Marne department
