= John Capgrave =

English hagiographer and theologian (1393–1464)

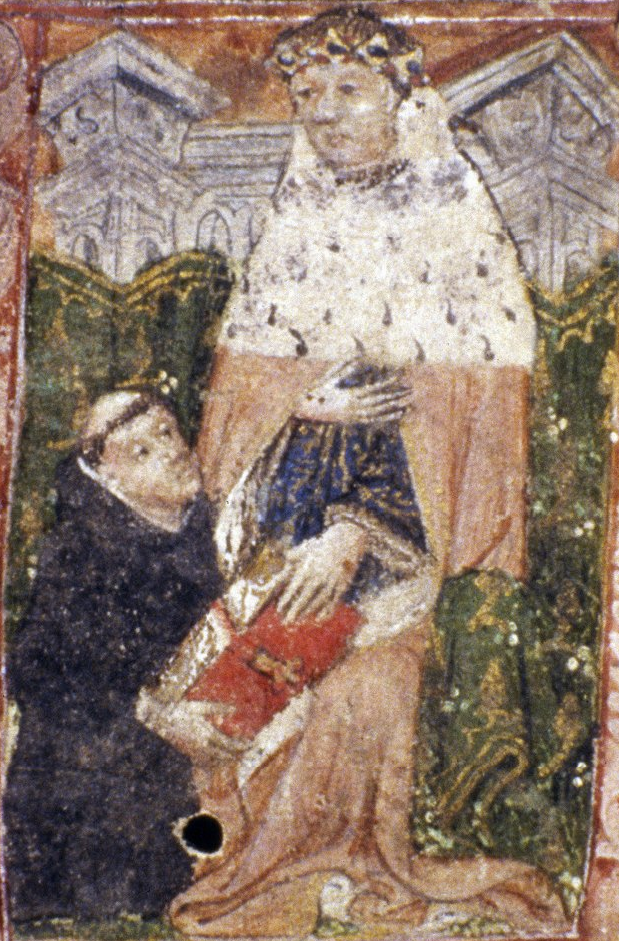
Detail of an historiated initial from John Capgrave's Commentary on Exodus (c. 1440) showing Capgrave presenting his book to Humphrey, Duke of Gloucester. It is one of three remaining volumes of Gloucester's original bequest to the Bodleian Library at Oxford University

John Capgrave (21 April 1393 – 12 August 1464) was an English historian and scholastic theologian.

He is often referred to in older literature as the supposed author of the Nova Legenda Angliae (New Legends of England), the first comprehensive book of saints printed in England. But since 1970 it has been known that this work was actually by John of Tynemouth.

== Schooling ==
Capgrave was born in Bishop's Lynn, now King's Lynn, Norfolk: "My cuntre is Northfolke, of the town of Lynne" (Life of St Katharine, p. 16). His parents are unknown but he may have been the nephew of a namesake who obtained a doctorate of theology at Oxford in 1390 and was also an Augustinian friar. Capgrave the younger joined the order at Lynn in about 1410 and was ordained in 1416 or 1417. He then studied theology at the order's school in London. By 1421, he was a lector, qualified to teach at all but one of the order's levels of schooling. He was then sent by the prior-general for further studies in Cambridge, where he delivered his examinatory sermon in Latin in 1422. He later wrote an English version of this as his treatise on the twelve orders that follow the rule of St Augustine. His progress from ordination to the degree of master of theology is said to have been the fastest recorded.

== Works ==
Capgrave's earliest work was a Life of St Norbert in English from some time before 1422. There followed a succession of exegeses, many of them now lost. His lost commentaries entitled In regum are known to have been dedicated to Humphrey of Lancaster, 1st Duke of Gloucester and to John Low, prior-provincial of the Augustinians in 1427–1433 and later a bishop. Capgrave was present when the foundation stone of King's College, Cambridge was laid on 2 April 1441 by Henry VI. Several hagiographies and royal biographies followed, including one in English of St Katharine. By 1446 he was Prior of the Augustinian friary at Bishop's Lynn.

Capgrave paid a visit to Rome in 1449–1450 for the holy year of Jubilee and left an account that provides a glimpse into the histories, legends, traditions and public attitudes in the church at that time. Some later works were dedicated to William Grey, King's Proctor in Rome in 1450 and later Bishop of Ely.

Only twelve of Capgrave's 45 known works survive, including the seven in English. Perhaps the most important for posterity was his Abbreviacion of Cronicles, which provides a frame for world history within an Augustinian framework, drawing on the St Albans chronicles by Thomas Walsingham and others. According to the Encyclopedia of Medieval Literature, the book "brings together what Capgrave felt were the most important events in world and later English history. He often moralized on historical incidents and consistently revealed a bias for Christians and later Englishmen in his depiction of events." His Liber de illustribus Henricis, completed between 1446 and 1453, was a collection of lives of German emperors (918–1198), English kings (1100–1446) and other famous Henries in various parts of the world (1031–1406).

He is often given as the author of the Nova legenda Angliae, derived from the Sanctilogium which the chronicler John of Tynemouth had completed in 1366; this in turn was largely borrowed from the Sanctilogium of Guido, abbot of Saint-Denis. The Nova legenda was printed by Wynkyn de Worde in 1516 and again in 1527. But Peter Lucas has shown conclusively that it cannot be his.

Capgrave died on 12 August 1464 at Bishop's Lynn.
