= Stephanie Hollis =

New Zealand emeritus professor in English

- Born: 1946 (age 79–80)

Academic background
- Education: Australian National University, University of Adelaide

Academic work
- Institutions: University of Auckland

Stephanie Joan Hollis (born 1946) is a New Zealand scholar of English, and is emeritus professor at the University of Auckland, specialising in medieval literature.

== Academic career ==
Hollis earned a Bachelor of Arts from the University of Adelaide, and then completed a PhD in English in 1977 at the Australian National University. Hollis then joined the faculty of the University of Auckland, rising to associate professor in 1995 and then full professor. Hollis was the Director of the Centre for Medieval and Early Modern European Studies at the university, which was created in 2003 in response to an increase in interest partly attributed to The Lord of the Rings.

Hollis retired and was appointed emeritus professor in 2009. She was a trustee of Auckland Library Heritage Trust from 2011 to 2016. Hollis served on the International Editorial Board of the journal Parergon.

Hollis has written and edited a number of books on medieval literature, including the 2007 volume Migrations: Medieval Manuscripts in New Zealand, co-edited with Alexandra Barratt, and published by Cambridge Scholars. This was the "only significant book-length work" to be published on New Zealand manuscripts since a catalogue of holdings by Margaret Manion, Vera Vines, and Christopher de Hamel published in 1989. Hollis has also written on Sir George Grey's collections in New Zealand and South Africa, and the founding of the priory at Minster-in-Thanet, and the poems Sir Gawain and the Green Knight and Beowulf.

== Selected works ==
=== Books ===
- Hollis, Stephanie, Barking Abbey and Herbals and Medical writing in Rouse, Robert; Echard, Sian; Fulton, Helen; Rector, Geoff; Fay, Jacqueline Ann, eds. (17 July 2017). The Encyclopedia of Medieval Literature in Britain (1 ed.). Wiley. doi:10.1002/9781118396957.wbemlb213. ISBN 978-1-118-39698-8.
- Wright, Michael; Hollis, Stephanie, eds. (2005). Anglo-saxon Manuscripts In Microfiche Facsimile: Manuscripts of Trinity College, Cambridge. Arizona State University Centre for Medieval and Renaissance Studies. ISBN 978-0866983174.
- Hollis, Stephanie, ed. (2004). Writing the Wilton Women: Goscelin's Legend of Edith and Liber Confortatorius. Brepols. ISBN 978-2503514369.
- Hollis, Stephanie; Wright, Michael, eds. (1993). Old English Prose of Secular Learning. (Annotated Bibliographies). D.S.Brewer. ISBN 978-0859913430.
- Hollis, Stephanie (1992). Anglo-Saxon Women and the Church: Sharing a Common Fate. Boydell & Brewer. ISBN 9780851153179.

=== Journal articles ===
- Hollis, Stephanie J. (2015). "Invidious comparisons: Manuscripts and incunabula in the libraries donated by Sir George Grey to Cape Town and Auckland". Parergon. 32 (2): 207–231. doi:10.1353/pgn.2015.0111 – via Project MUSE.
- Hollis, Stephanie (1998). "The Old English "Ritual of the Admission of Mildrith" (London, Lambeth Palace 427, fol. 210)". The Journal of English and Germanic Philology. 97 (3): 311–321. ISSN 0363-6941. JSTOR 27711680.
- Hollis, Stephanie (1998). "The Minster-in-Thanet foundation story". Anglo-Saxon England. 27: 41–64. doi:10.1017/S0263675100004798. ISSN 0263-6751. JSTOR 44510367.
- Hollis, Stephanie J. (1983). "Beowulf and the Succession". Parergon. 1 (1): 39–54. doi:10.1353/pgn.1993.0001. ISSN 1832-8334.
- Hollis, Stephanie J. (1981). "The Pentangle Knight: "Sir Gawain and the Green Knight"". The Chaucer Review. 15 (3): 267–281. ISSN 0009-2002. JSTOR 25093761.
