= John of Tynemouth (chronicler) =

14th-century English chronicler

John of Tynemouth (sometimes John of York or John de Tinmouth) was a medieval English chronicler who flourished in the mid-14th century.

Little is known of his background. According to medieval accounts, he was claimed to have been the vicar of the parish of Tynemouth in Northumberland. From his writings, he was familiar with the area around Wheatley, near Winchester, which might mean that he could be identified with John Whetely, who is known to have been the vicar at Tynemouth during the 1350s and 1360s. Or possibly, the Wheatley was the one in Yorkshire, which would explain the alternate name he is occasionally given in manuscripts, John York. John may have been a monk of St Albans Abbey, for his work was early associated with that monastery, and the vicar at Tynemouth was appointed by the prior of the monastic priory at Tynemouth that was a dependent priory of St Albans.

John was the author of a chronicle, the Historia aurea, which was a work composed about 1350. It was a history of the world from the creation to 1347. He used as sources a shortened version of the Polychronicon. The Historia survives in full in manuscripts that were originally from Durham Cathedral, Bury St Edmunds Abbey, and St Albans. The St Albans copies, however, are only dated to the 15th century, which undercuts the idea that John might have been a monk at that abbey. The Historia also survives in shortened versions.

Besides the Historia, he also authored a Sanctilogium, or Sanctilogium Angliae Walliae Scotiae et Hiberniae, which gave the lives of 156 English saints. The Sanctilogium survives in a single manuscript, now in the British Library, where it is Cotton Library MS Tiberius E.i. He also wrote a Martyrologium, which survives in some extracts that are appended to one of the manuscripts of the Historia aurea. The Sanctilogium was subsequently rearranged into alphabetical order by an unknown author, and published in 1516 under the title Nova Legenda Angliae (also spelled Anglie).
