= Sæthryth =

East Anglian saint

Sæthryth (Old English: Sǣþrȳð; fl. 660s), also called Sedrido, Sethrida or Saethrid, was the stepdaughter of king Anna of East Anglia.

Sæthryth was sent to the Abbey of Faremoutiers in Brie to be educated, and became a Benedictine nun, under its foundress Burgundofara, whom she succeeded as abbess. Seaxburh, Ethelburga, Etheldreda and Withburga were half-sisters.

== Feast Day ==
Her feast day is January 7, formerly January 10.

== See also ==
- Chronological list of saints in the 7th century
