= Æthelburh of Faremoutiers =

7th-century Anglo-Saxon princess, abbess and saint

Saint Æthelburh
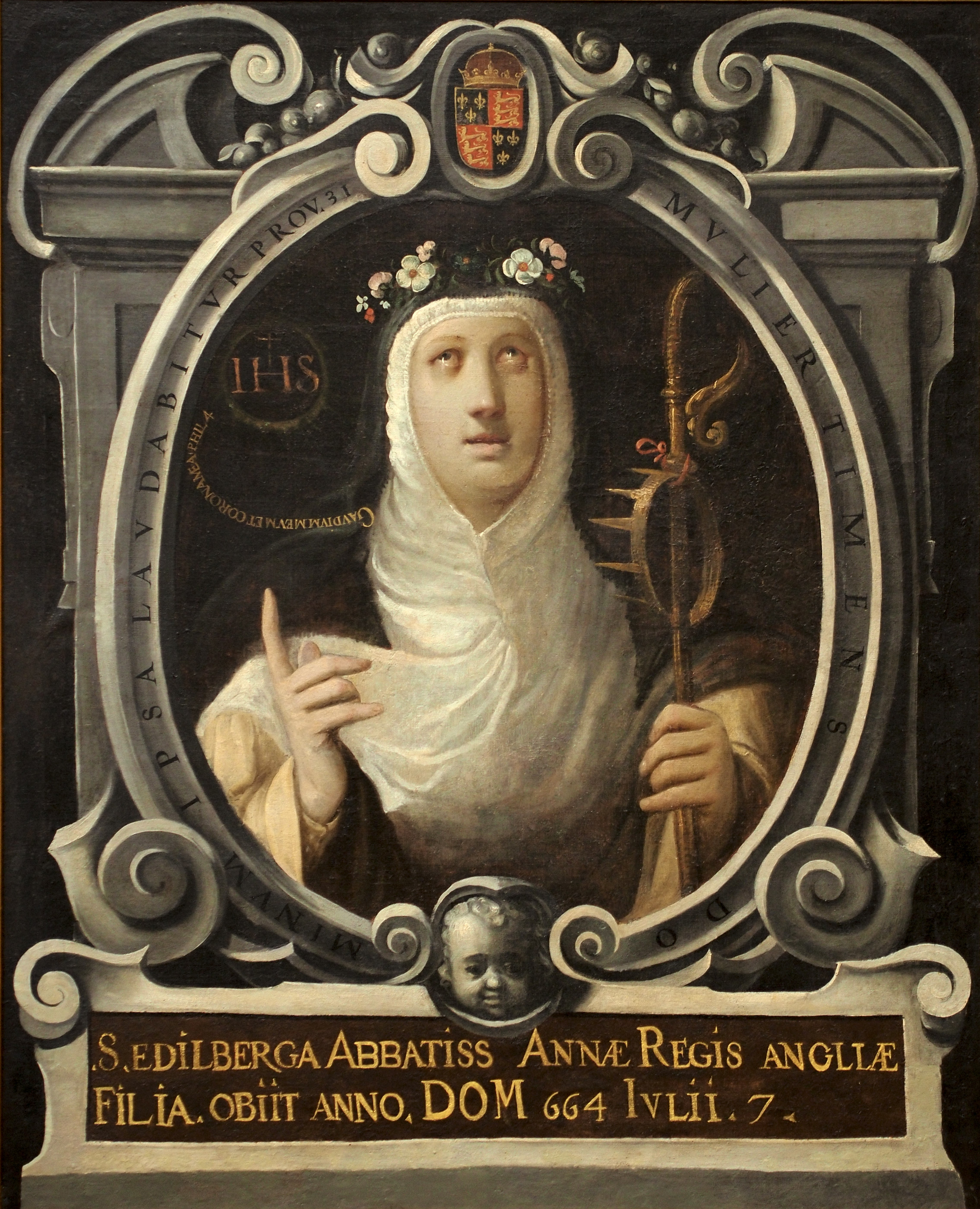
- Saint Ethelburga by Juan de Roelas, Valladolid, Spain

Princess Abbess
- Born: Kingdom of East Anglia
- Died: 7 July 664
- Feast: 7 July

Æthelburh (died 7 July 664), known as Ethelburga, was an Anglo-Saxon princess, abbess and saint.

== Background ==
Æthelburh was one of the daughters of King Anna of East Anglia although she was probably illegitimate. Her sisters were Withburga, Saethryth, who was abbess of Faremoutiers Abbey in Brie, Seaxburh and Æthelthryth who were abbesses of Ely.

Æthelburh and Saethryth were sent to the nunnery of Faremoutiers in France for their education. While there Saethryth became a nun and eventually succeeded Æthelburh as abbess. As abbess, Saethryth began work on a church in honour of the twelve apostles which was left unfinished at her death in 664. At her request she was buried in the church. After seven years a decision was made to move her bones to the nearby church of Saint Stephen and her body was found to be uncorrupted. Her feast day is 7 July.

== See also ==
- Wuffing dynasty family tree
