= Seaxburh of Ely =

Queen of King Eorcenberht of Kent

Saint Seaxburh
- Stained glass portrait in St Alban's Abbey

Queen consort of Kent
- Born: early 7th century
- Died: 6 July 699; Ely, Cambridgeshire, England
- Venerated in: Catholic Church; Eastern Orthodox Church, Anglican Communion
- Canonized: Pre-Congregation
- Major shrine: St Etheldreda's Church, London
- Feast: 6 July; 17 October (translation)

Seaxburh [ˈsæ͜ɑksˌburˠɣ], also Saint Sexburga of Ely (d. c. AD 699), was an Anglo-Saxon queen and abbess, venerated a saint of the Christian Church. She was married to King Eorcenberht of Kent.

After her husband's death in AD 664, Seaxburh remained in Kent to bring up her children. She acted as regent until her young son Ecgberht came of age.

Seaxburh founded the abbeys at Milton Regis and Minster-in-Sheppey where her daughter Ermenilda was also a nun. She moved to the double monastery at Ely where her sister Æthelthryth was abbess and succeeded her when she died in 679.

According to Bede, in 695, Seaxburh organised the movement (or translation) of Æthelthryth's remains to a marble sarcophagus, after they had lain for sixteen years in a common grave. On opening the grave, it was discovered that her body was miraculously preserved. The legend is described in Bede's Ecclesiastical History of the English People, which celebrates the saintly virtues of Æthelthryth, but speaks less highly of Seaxburh, referring only to her marriage, succession as abbess and translation of her sister's relics. The date of Seaxburh's death at Ely is not known. The surviving versions of the Vita Sexburge, compiled after 1106, describe her early life, marriage to Eorcenberht, retirement from secular life and her final years as a nun and abbess at Ely.

== Family ==
Seaxburh was a daughter of Anna, King of East Anglia, the son of Eni, who ruled the East Angles from the early 640s and was slain together with his son Jurmin at the Battle of Bulcamp in 653 or 654.

Seaxburh married Eorcenberht of Kent, and was the mother of kings Ecgberht (d. 673), Hlothhere (d. 685), and of Saints Eormenhild and Ercengota. Her marriage to Eorcenberht produced two sons, both of whom ruled, and two daughters.

Seaxburh's sisters were Æthelburg of Faremoutiers, Saethryth, Æthelthryth and possibly Withburga. She was the sister of Æthelburg and Saethryth, who were both abbesses of Faremoutiers Abbey in Brie, and also the sister of Æthelthryth, who married firstly Tonberht an ealderman of the South Gyrwe in the Fens, and secondly Ecgfrith of Northumbria. Withburga, who died in 743, may also have been her sister.

The historian Barbara Yorke mentions the possibility that Seaxburh and her namesake Seaxburh of Wessex were the same person, but also notes that the accounts of Seaxburh's religious life at Ely contradict this suggestion.

Seaxburh was buried at Ely with her sisters Æthelthryth and Wihtburh, along with her daughter Eormenhild.

== Marriage and widowhood ==
A map of the Anglo-Saxon kingdoms in the 7th century

Seaxburh was connected with the royal family of the Magonsætan by her marriage to Eorcenberht, who was king of Kent from 640 to 664. Eorcenberht was the great-uncle of Mildburh and her sisters, the daughters of King Merewalh of the Magonsætan.

Their sons Ecgberht and Hlothhere both became kings of Kent. Their daughter Ercongota was a nun at Faremoutiers, who was eventually canonised. Eorcenberht is mentioned in the Anglo-Saxon Chronicle within the annal for 640: "Then his son Eorcenberht succeeded to the kingdom; he overthrew all devil-worship in his kingdom, and was the first of the English kings to establish the Easter festival". In the same passage is the Chronicle's single reference to Seaxburh and Eorcengota, "...þaes dohter wæs ge haten Erchongata halifemne. and wundorlic man. thære modor wæs Sexburh Annan dohter East Engla ciningas" – '...his daughter was called Eorcengota, a holy and a remarkable person, whose mother was Seaxburh, daughter of Anna, king of the East Anglians'. Seaxburh and Eorcenberht had a second daughter, Ermenilda, who married Wulfhere of Mercia and after his death became a nun and was later canonised. According to Barbara Yorke, Seaxburh's marriage was itself of seminal importance in the establishment of monastic life for women during the Anglo-Saxon period, as she became an example of an ex-queen who made retreating to an nunnery a desirable royal vocation.

Eorcenberht died on 14 July 664, in an outbreak of plague that occurred that year. After her husband's death, Seaxburh remained in Kent to bring up her children. She played an important political and religious influence in the kingdom: she acted as regent for her son Ecgberht, ruling Kent until her young son came of age, and was the founder of Kent's first abbey for women at Milton. Thereafter, Seaxburh became a nun and founded the abbey of Minster-in-Sheppey. (Note: See Dockray-Miller, pp. 13-14, for the text of Lambeth Palace MS 427 in both modern and Old English, which gives an account of the building of the minster at Sheppey, and alludes to Seaxburh's use of slave labour: 'Then it pleased the holy queen Seaxburh that she there might within [the isle] for pleasure and for honour for herself there build and settle a minster, so that formerly men said that for thirty years never stilled the sound of creaking wagons nor complaining slaves...') According to the Liber Eliensis, a 12th-century chronicle and history written at Ely, an English source related that Seaxburh received "the veil of holiness" from Theodore, the Archbishop of Canterbury, in her church on the Isle of Sheppey and that her daughter Eormenhild also became a nun there. Seaxburh is said by her hagiographer to have sought refuge as a nun after living a secular role that she had found hard to tolerate: having reluctantly submitted to marriage, she hastened from queenhood to "a timely widowhood and a hasty withdrawal to the religious life", according to Susan Ridyard.

Eorcenberht of Kent	Seaxburh of Ely
Ermenilda	Wulfhere of Mercia	Ercongota	Ecgberht of Kent	Hlothhere of Kent

== Religious life at Ely ==
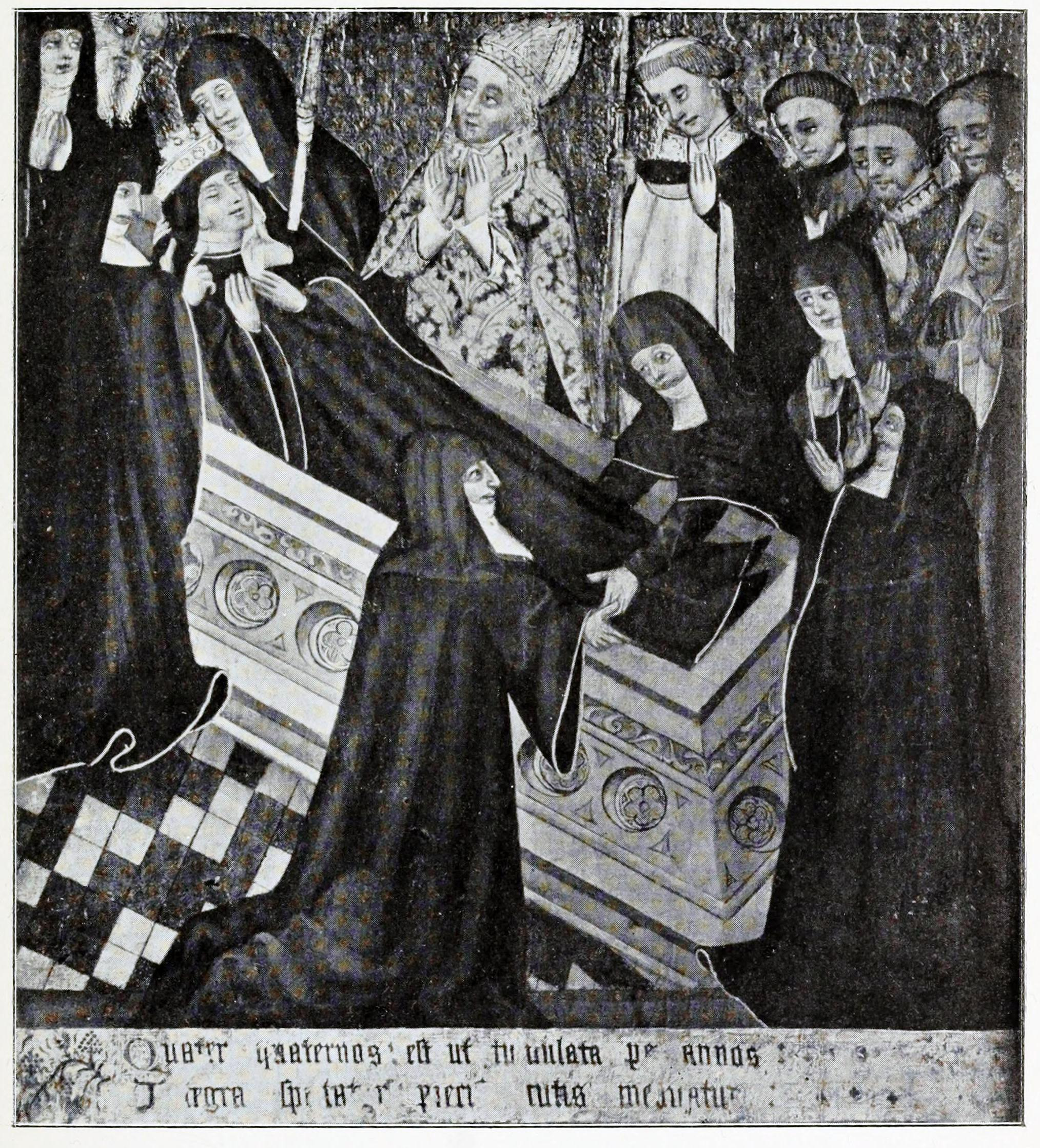
Medieval painting of the translation of Æthelthryth at Ely, attended by her sister Seaxburh

Shortly afterwards Seaxburh moved to the double monastery at Ely, which was the precursor to Ely Cathedral, and where her sister Æthelthryth was abbess.

According to Yorke, Seaxburh's retirement to Ely is an example an Anglo-Saxon custom represented in a law: whereby a married woman remained the responsibility of the paternal side of her family, perhaps to spend the rest of her days as a nun or an abbess. Described by the Liber Eliensis as a "pretiosa virago" (precious lady-warrior) she succeeded as abbess when Æthelthryth died, probably of plague, in 679. Seaxburh's previous political experience in East Anglia and Kent would have been useful in preparing her for the role of abbess at the double monastery at Ely.

In 695 Seaxburh decided to translate the remains of her sister Æthelthryth (who had been dead for sixteen years) from a common grave to the new church at Ely in a vivid demonstration of the dynastic value of the cult of royal saints in Anglo-Saxon England, Patrick Sims-Williams has identified Seaxburh as "the chief mover behind the translation of her body and the promulagation of her cult". The Liber Eliensis describes these events in detail. When her grave was opened, Æthelthryth's body was discovered to be uncorrupted and her coffin and clothes proved to possess miraculous powers. A sarcophagus made of white marble was taken from the Roman ruins at Grantchester, which was found to be the right fit for Æthelthryth.

The architectural historian John Crook questions how such miraculous coincidences feature in hagiographies (the studies of the lives of saints), when he observes that "the miraculous discovery of a suitable coffin is, however, a hagiographic commonplace". Seaxburh's supervised the preparation of her sister's body, which was washed and wrapped in new robes before being reburied. She apparently oversaw the translation of her sister's remains without the supervision of her bishop, using her knowledge of procedures gained from her family's links with the abbey at Faremoutiers as a basis for the ceremony.

The fourth book of the Ecclesiastical History of the English People, completed by the Northumbrian monk Bede in 731, celebrates the monastery at Ely and focuses on Æthelthryth's piety and the translation of her relics. Bede does not mention the matrilinear succession established at Ely by Æthelthryth, where power passed in turn to Seaxburh before subsequently transferring to Seaxburh's daughter Eormenhild and to her granddaughter, Werburh. He praises the virtues of Æthelthryth, a princess who was married twice but still preserved her virginity. Seaxburh receives little praise from Bede, as she had borne children before becoming a nun. He only mentions Seaxburh's marriage to Eorcenberht, succession as abbess and translation of her sister's relics.

== Death and veneration ==
The date of Seaxburh's death is not known, but when she died at Ely, she was at "a good, late age", according to the Liber Eliensis, which also related that Richard, the last Abbot of Ely, translated the remains of Seaxburh and of "all the saintly women reposing in that place". Her feast day is 6 July.

Seaxburh is mentioned in a written account of Kent's earliest Christian kings and their canonised relatives, known as the Kentish Royal Legend (Old English: Þá hálgan). These kings, queens and princesses were unified by their holiness and royal connections. Pauline Stafford notes that the Legend "may have been a Christian alternative to pagan genealogy" to the rulers of 10th- and 11th-century mediaeval England, as it described an earlier period of sustained Christian piety within the royal dynasty of Kent. Being both a queen and a saint, Seaxburh was held in high regard within the Legend: within it her role as queen and the founder of the minster at Sheppey was highlighted.

The 1913 edition of the Catholic Encyclopedia lists several separate accounts of the saint's deeds and miracles, or Lives. The Life (or Vita) printed in John Capgrave's Nova, Legenda and used by the Bollandists, was perhaps copied from a Cotton manuscript in the British Museum. There is another Vita in Latin in the same collection, but it was so damaged by fire that it is useless. The surviving versions of the Vita Sexburge were compiled after 1106 (the year the relics of Seaxburh were translated) and are copies from an earlier manuscript, now lost. The Vita describes Seaxburh's early life, marriage to Eorcenberht, withdrawal to Milton and then Minster-in-Sheppey, and her final years as a nun and the abbess at Ely. The section relating to her life at Sheppey is similar to another fragment, dating between the 9th and 11th centuries, and currently kept at Lambeth Palace. It has been suggested that part of the Vita Sexburge was derived from this manuscript, or that both parts originated from an earlier version of Seaxburh's Life.

== See also ==
- List of Catholic saints
- Anglo-Saxon Christianity
- Wuffingas

== Sources ==
- Bede; Bertram Colgrave; R. A. B. Mynors (2008). Bede: Ecclesiastical History of the English People. Cambridge: Clarendon Press. ISBN 978-0-19-953723-5.
- Butler, Alban (1998) [1756-9]. Burns, Paul (ed.). Butler's Lives of the Saints: February. Tunbridge Wells: Burns & Oates. ISBN 978-0-86012-251-7.
- Crook, John (2000). The Architectural Setting of the Cult of Saints in the Early Christian West. Oxford, New York: Oxford University Press. ISBN 978-0-19-820794-8.
- Dockray-Miller, Mary (2000). Motherhood and Mothering in Anglo-Saxon England. New York: St. Martin's Press. ISBN 978-0-312-22721-0.
- Earle, John (1865). Two of the Saxon Chronicles Parallel (in Old English). Oxford: Clarendon Press. OCLC 10565546. "Earle, John (1865). Two of the Saxon Chronicles Parallel."
- Fairweather, Janet (2005). Liber Eliensis: a History of the Isle of Ely from the Seventh Century to the Twelfth. Woodbridge: Boydell Press. ISBN 978-1-84383-015-3.
- Fryde, E. B.; Greenway, D. E.; Porter, S.; Roy, I. (1986). Handbook of British Chronology (3rd ed.). Cambridge: Cambridge University Press. ISBN 978-0-521-56350-5.
- Goscelin of Saint-Bertin (2004) [11th century]. Love, Rosalind C. (ed.). Goscelin of Saint-Bertin: the Hagiography of the Female Saints of Ely. Oxford, New York: Oxford University Press. ISBN 978-0-19-820815-0.
- Ridyard, Susan Janet (1988). The Royal Saints of Anglo-Saxon England: a Study of West Saxon and East Anglian Cults. Cambridge: Cambridge University Press. ISBN 978-0-521-30772-7.
- Sims-Williams, Patrick (1990). Religion and Literature in Western England, 600-800. Cambridge: Cambridge University Press. ISBN 978-0-521-38325-7.
- Stafford, Pauline (2001). Queen Emma and Queen Edith: Queenship and Women's Power in Eleventh-Century England. Oxford, Malden: Blackwell. ISBN 978-0-631-22738-0.
- Williams, Ann; Smyth, Alfred P.; Kirby, D. P. (1991). A biographical dictionary of dark age Britain: England, Scotland, and Wales, c.500-c.1050. London: B A Seaby Ltd. ISBN 978-1-85264-047-7.
- Yorke, Barbara (2003). Nunneries and the Anglo-Saxon Royal Houses. London, New York: Continuum. ISBN 978-0-8264-6040-0.

Preceded by Emma of Austrasia	Queen Consort of Kent; 640–664	Succeeded by ?
