= Ely Abbey =

Anglo-Saxon monastic establishment on the Isle of Ely, England

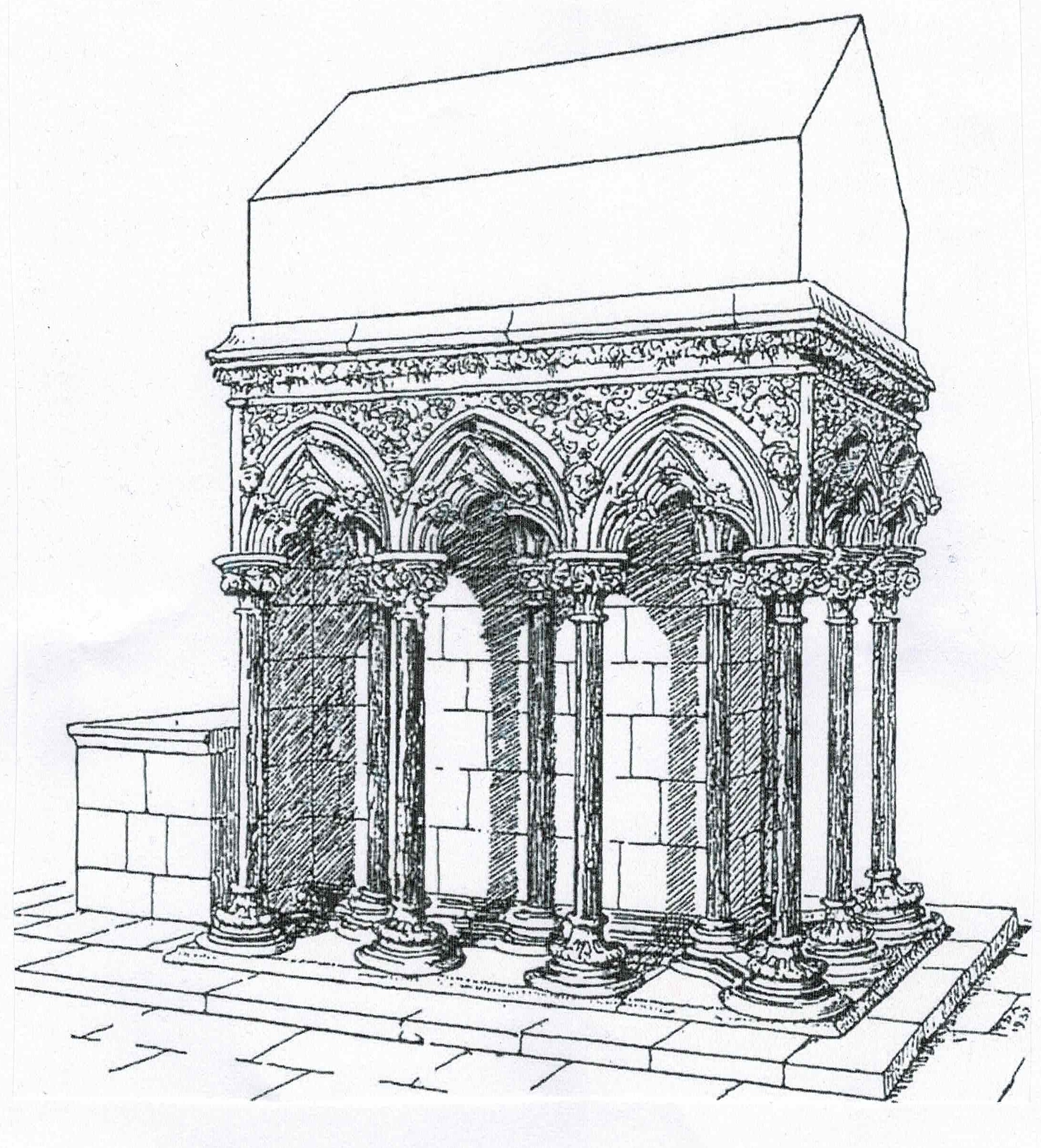
Shrine to St Etheldreda reconstructed by Thomas Dinham Atkinson

Ely Abbey was an Anglo-Saxon monastic establishment on the Isle of Ely first established in 673 by Æthelthryth the daughter of Anna, King of East Anglia. The first establishment was destroyed by the Danes in 870, but Edgar, King of England re-established the monastery in 970 as part of the English Benedictine Reform.

== First establishment ==
The precise siting of Æthelthryth's original monastery is not known. It was built on land she had received from her late husband, Tondberct, "prince of the South Gyrwas", as a morning gift.

The original Abbey was established in 673 as a double monastery with facilities for both monks and nuns. Athelthryth's sister, Seaxburh married King Eorcenberht of Kent. Upon her husband's death, she served as regent for her son, Ecgberht. Despite having founded abbeys at Milton Regis and Minster-in-Sheppey (where her daughter, Ermenilda was a nun), she subsequently chose to retire to her sister's foundation at Ely. When Athelthryth died in 679, Seaxburh succeeded her as abbess.

In 1036 Alfred Aethling, a son of the late King Aethelred of England (known as the ‘Unready’, or ‘Ill-Counselled’) and Queen Emma and a younger brother of Aethelred’s son Edward (who was to become King Edward ‘the Confessor’) was cared for by the monks at Ely Abbey after the assassination attempt on him and the resulting horrific multiple injuries caused to him that year, committed on the orders of Harold Godwin. When he died at the abbey in 1036 Alfred was buried at the western end of the abbey church ‘near to the steeple and south portico’, according to the Anglo-Saxon Chronicle (versions C & D)and the ‘Liber Eliensis’.

== See also ==
- Category:Abbots of Ely
- Category:Abbesses of Ely
