= Faremoutiers Abbey =

Abbey in Seine-et-Marne, France

Coordinates: 48°48′7″N 2°59′51″E

Faremoutiers Abbey (French: Abbaye Notre-Dame de Faremoutiers) was an important Merovingian Benedictine monastery of nuns in the present Seine-et-Marne department of France. Closed by the French Revolution, the monastery was reestablished in the 20th century. In its early days, the community was an important link between the Merovingian Frankish Empire and the southern Anglo-Saxon kingdoms of Kent and East Anglia.

== History ==
The abbey was founded around 620 by Burgundofara (Saint Fara), the first abbess. She had been consecrated to God, while yet a child, by Columbanus. With the approval of Bishop Gundoald of Meaux, Burgundofara established an abbey on her father's lands. Eustace of Luxeuil supplied monks as chaplains and to assist in building the monastery.

It was a double monastery, the first in France, with communities of both monks and nuns. The main buildings and the abbey church were in the middle of a large enclosure; the monastery of the brothers was located outside of it. It was established to follow the strict Rule of Saint Columbanus. The site, an estate belonging to Fara's family, originally known as Evoriacum, was renamed Faremoutiers ("Fara's monastery") in her honour. The modern village of Faremoutiers grew up around the abbey. Jonas of Bobbio, biographer of Columbanus stayed at Faremoutiers in 633. Three women of the royal house of East Anglia entered the Abbey of Faremoutiers: Sæthryth, the step-daughter of King Anna, Anna's daughter Æthelburh, and his grand-daughter by his daughter Seaxburh, Eorcengota (†660), daughter of Eorcenberht of Kent. Queen Balthild of Chelles was an important benefactress of the monastery, as was Erchinoald, mayor of the palace of Neustria.

In the 9th century, as all French abbeys were commanded to do by Louis the Pious, it changed to the Rule of Saint Benedict. In 887, the Abbey was sacked by the Normans. The monasteries became increasingly populated by young women from the nobility, and the Carolingian royal family. As the rules were relaxed, a period of decadence followed. Faremoutiers thus declined into the hands of the local lords and mutated into a place of receptions and maintenance of men-at-arms. Around 1094 Philip I of France wrote the abbot of Marmoutier and "...asked him to reform the monastery of Faremoutiers because of the nuns' dissolute lifestyle". In 1140 the monastery was destroyed by fire, but rebuilt in 1145. In 1445, at the end of the Hundred Years' War, it was pillaged by soldiers.

In the 16th and 17th centuries the abbey enjoyed royal favour, and saw a number of abbesses appointed by the crown. In 1683, at the request of Louis XIV, architect Jules Hardouin-Mansart took charge of the reconstruction of the main building of the Abbey. Anna Gonzague de Clèves-Nevers, daughter of Charles I Gonzaga, Duke of Mantua, was educated at Faremoutiers. The abbey was later tainted by Jansenism, and in the 18th century suffered from an exhausting lawsuit with the bishop of Meaux and continuing economic problems.

It was suppressed during the French Revolution, and the forty-three nuns were dispersed at the end of 1792. Most rejoined their families. Until 1796 the premises were used as a barracks and thereafter as a quarry.

== Re-foundation ==
In 1923 Benedictine nuns from the Abbaye Saint-Nicolas de Verneuil settled in Amillis before founding in 1931 a small community on the site of Faremoutier abbey, which remains to this day. The Abbey of Faremoutiers now belongs to the Benedictine Congregation of Mont-Olivet. Since 1980, the monastery has operated as an EHPAD, i.e. a Residential care home for senior citizens, primarily elderly nuns from different monasteries throughout France.

== List of abbesses of Faremoutiers ==
- Burgundofara or Saint Fara (c. 620–643x655)
- Saint Sæthryth (d. before 664), stepdaughter of King Anna of East Anglia
- Saint Æthelburg (died c. 664), daughter of King Anna of East Anglia
- Ruothild (840-852), daughter of Charlemagne
- Bertrade de Germanie (852-877), daughter of Louis the German
- Judith (died 977)
- Avelina (10th century)
- Hildegarde (10th century)
- Risende (1137-1146)
- Emma (1146-1154)
- Lucienne de La Chapelle (1154-1212)
- Marguerite I (1212-1215)
- Hersende de Touquin (1215-1219)
- Eustachie (1219-1240)
- Julienne de Grez de Nesle-en-Brie (1240-1252)
- Sibylle (1252-1272)
- Avoie (1272-1289)
- Marguerite II de Mons (1289-1290)
- Marguerite III de Chevry (1290-1312)
- Marguerite IV de Mons (1312-1341)
- Mathilde de Joinville de La Malmaison (1341-1346)
- Jeanne I de Noyers (1346-1363)
- Marguerite V de Lully d’Ancre (1363-1383)
- Marguerite VI de Noyers (1383-1409)
- Jeanne II de Châteauvillain (1409-1417)
- Denise du Sollier (1417-1434)
- Jeanne III Rapillard (1434-1439)
- Isabelle I de Mory (1439-1454)
- Jeanne IV de Bautot (1454-1490)
- Jeanne V Chrestienne d’Harcourt-Beuvron (1490-1511)
- Madeleine de Valois-Orléans-Angoulême (1511-1515), daughter of Charles, Count of Angoulême
- Marie I Cornu (1515-1518)
- Jeanne VI Joly (1518-1531)
- Marie II Baudry (1531-1555)
- Antoinette de Lorraine-Guise (1555-1563), daughter of Claude, Duke of Guise
- Françoise Guillard (1563-1567)
- Marie III Violle (1567-1573)
- Louise I de Bourbon-Montpensier (1573-1586), daughter of Louis, Duke of Montpensier
- Isabelle II de Chauvigny (1586-1593)
- Anne de La Châtre de Maisonfort (1593-1605)
- Françoise I de La Châtre de Maisonfort (1605-1643)
- Jeanne VII Anne de Plas (1643-1677)
- Marie IV Thérèse-Constance du Blé d’Uxelles (1677-1685)
- Marie V Anne-Généreuse-Constance de Beringhen d’Armainvilliers (1685-1721)
- Louise II Charlotte-Eugènie-Victoire de Beringhen d’Armainvilliers (1721-1726)
- Olympe-Félicité-Sophie-Fare de Beringhen d’Armainvilliers (1726-1743)
- Françoise II Catherine Molé de Champlâtreux (1743-1745)
- Marie Renée de Maupeou (1745-1759)
- Charlotte-Julie Lenormant des Forts d’Etiolles (1759-1775)
- Claude de Durfort de Léobard (1775-1791)

== See also ==
- List of Carolingian monasteries
- Carolingian architecture

== Sources ==
- de Fontaine de Resbecq, Eugène: Histoire de Faremoutiers (1991). ISBN 978-2-87760-669-1
- Guerout, Jean: Faremoutiers. In: Lexikon des Mittelalters (LexMA). Band 4, Artemis & Winkler, München/Zürich 1989. ISBN 3-7608-8904-2
- Riché, Pierre, Dictionnaire des Francs: Les temps Mérovingiens. Eds. Bartillat, 1996. ISBN 2-84100-008-7
