= Ermenilda of Ely =

Anglo-Saxon saint

Saint Ermenilda of Ely

Abbess
- Born: Eormenhild
- Died: c. 700/703
- Feast: 13 February

Saint Eormenhild (or Ermenilda, Ermenildis, Ermengild, all meaning "battle-great", from eormen- "great", hild- "battle") (died about 700/703) is a 7th-century Anglo-Saxon saint venerated in the Eastern Orthodox and Roman Catholic churches.

== Life ==
She features in the genealogies of various 11th- and 12th-century versions of the Kentish Royal Legend. These describe her as the daughter of King Eorcenberht of Kent and St Seaxburh of Ely, and wife to Wulfhere of Mercia, with whom she had a daughter, St Wærburh, and a son, Coenred. Eormenhild became a nun after her husband died in 675. In due course, she became abbess of Minster-in-Sheppey, which her mother had founded. Later, she became abbess of Ely.

There are almost no contemporary records for her life. When discussing Wulfhere, Bede mentions neither her nor her daughter Wærburh. However, her name is mentioned as an abbess in a (copy of a) charter of King Wihtred of Kent, dated 699, along with three other abbesses present at the occasion when the charter was issued: "Irminburga, Aeaba et Nerienda".

Her feast day is 13 February.

== Primary sources ==
- Charter of King Wihtred, Sawyer no. 20 (AD 699)
- The Kentish Royal Legend, also known as Þá hálgan (Cambridge, CCC, MS 201,), ed. Felix Liebermann, Die Heiligen Englands. Hanover, 1889. 1–10. Edition transcribed by Alaric Hall.
- Kentish Royal Legend / Þá hálgan (London, Lambeth Palace 427, f. 211), transcribed by Alaric Hall
- Anonymous Old English Life of St. Mildrith (Caligula), ed. and tr. Oswald Cockayne, Leechdoms, Wortcunning, and Starcraft of Early England, vol. 3. London, 1866. 422-9 (Caligula), 428-32 (MS Lambeth Palace). Caligula text partially transcribed by Alaric Hall and Cockayne's volume available as PDF from Google Books.
- Goscelin, Vita Deo delectae virginis Mildrethae, 11th century. Published in Latin, in Rollason, D, (1982) The Mildrith Legend, Leicester University Press.
- Charter of King Cnut, Sawyer no. 958 (AD 1022), possibly a forgery.
- Goscelin, Lectiones in natale S. Eormenhilde, ed. and tr. Rosalind C. Love, Goscelin of Saint-Bertin. The Hagiography of the Female Saints of Ely. OMT. Oxford, 2004. 11 ff.
- Liber Eliensis, ed. E.O. Blake, Liber Eliensis. Camden Society 3.92. London, 1962; tr. J. Fairweather. Liber Eliensis. A History of the Isle of Ely from the Seventh Century to the Twelfth. Woodbridge, 2005.
