= Eorcenberht of Kent =

King of Kent from 640 to 664

Eorcenberht

King of Kent
- Reign: 20 January 640 – 14 July 664
- Predecessor: Eadbald
- Successor: Ecgberht
- Died: 14 July 664
- Burial: Church of St Mary, Canterbury
- Spouse: Seaxburh of Ely
- Issue: Ecgberht; Hlothhere; Eorcengota; Ermenilda
- Father: Eadbald
- Mother: Emma of Austrasia
- Religion: Chalcedonian Christianity

Map of Kent in Eorcenberht's time

Eorcenberht of Kent ([ˈe͜orˠ.kenˌberˠxt], also Ærconberht, Earconberht, Earconbert; died 14 July 664) was king of the Anglo-Saxon kingdom of Kent from 640 until his death, succeeding his father Eadbald.

The Kentish Royal Legend (also known as the Mildrith legend) suggests that he was the younger son of Eadbald and Emma of Austrasia, and that his older brother Eormenred was deliberately passed over, although another possibility is that they ruled jointly.

According to Bede (HE III.8), Eorcenberht was the first king in Britain to command that pagan "idols" (cult images) be destroyed and that Lent be observed, marking a key point in the Christianisation of Anglo-Saxon England. It has been suggested that these orders may have been officially committed to writing, in the tradition of Kentish law-codes initiated by Æthelberht, but no such text survives.

After the death of Honorius, Archbishop of Canterbury, Eorcenberht appointed the first Saxon archbishop, Deusdedit, in 655.

Eorcenberht married Seaxburh of Ely, daughter of king Anna of East Anglia. They had two sons, Ecgberht and Hlothhere, who each consecutively became king of Kent, and two daughters who both were eventually canonized: Saint Eorcengota became a nun at Faremoutiers Abbey on the continent, and Saint Ermenilda became abbess at Ely.

Eorcenberht was probably buried alongside his parents in the Church of St Mary, which his father had built in the precincts of the monastery of St Peter and St Paul in Canterbury, a church later incorporated within the Norman edifice of St Augustine's. At that time, his relics were translated for reburial in the south transept c. 1087.

== Notes ==
Regnal titles
| Preceded by Eadbald | King of Kent; 640–664 | Succeeded by Ecgberht |
