= Æthelthryth =

East Anglian princess, queen, and abbess (c. 636–679)

Saint Æthelthryth
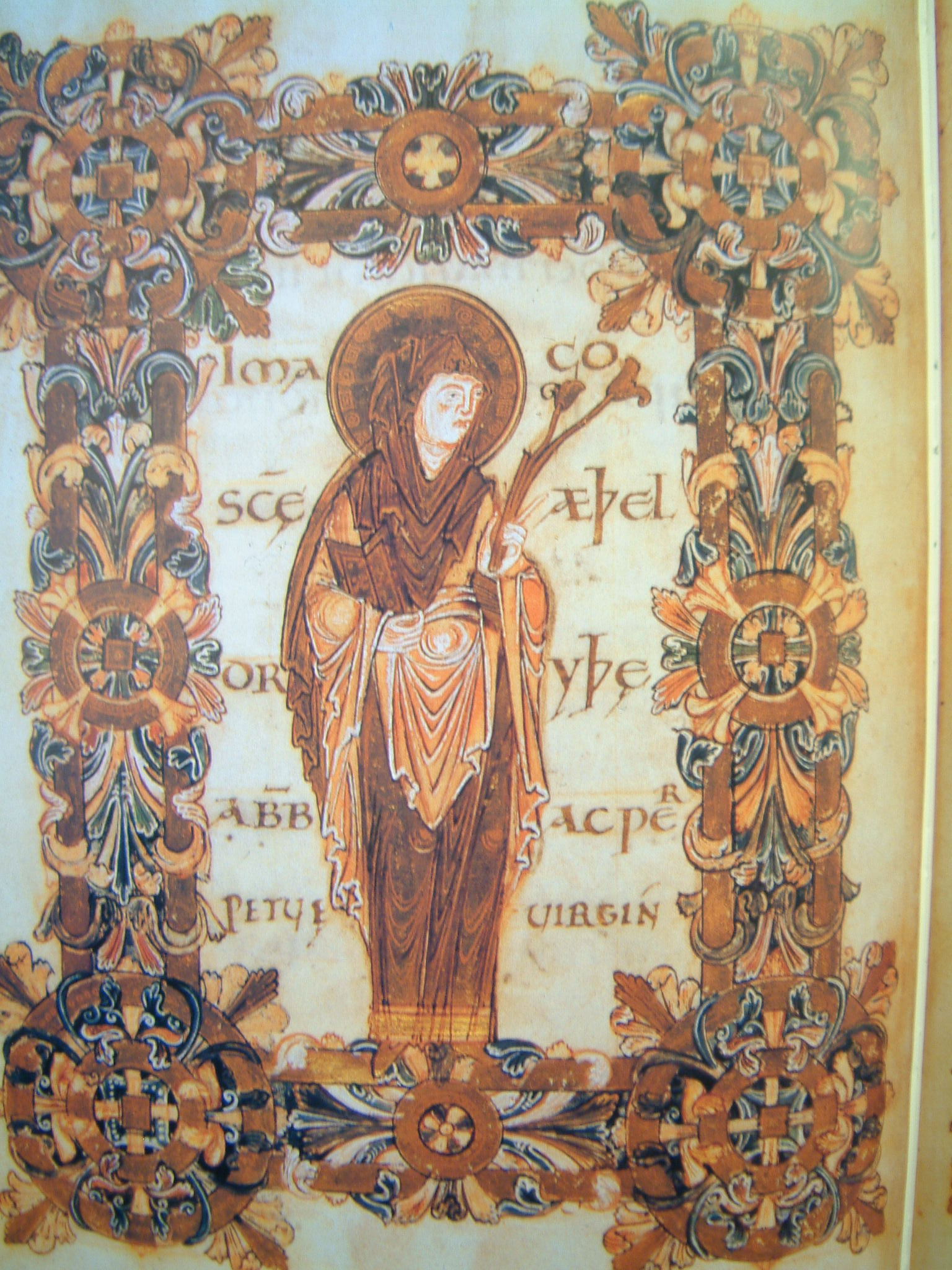
- Saint Æthelthryth from Benedictional of St Æthelwold, 10 C British Library

Virgin, Abbess of Ely
- Born: 4 March 636; Exning, Suffolk
- Died: 23 June 679 (aged 43); Ely, Cambridgeshire
- Venerated in: Eastern Orthodox Church, True Orthodox Church; Catholic Church; Anglican Communion
- Major shrine: St Etheldreda's Church, Ely Place, Holborn, London; Originally Ely Cathedral (now destroyed)
- Feast: 23 June (Catholic), 17 October (Anglican)
- Attributes: Abbess holding a model of Ely Cathedral
- Patronage: Throat complaints

Æthelthryth (or Æðelþryð or Æþelðryþe; 4 March 636 – 23 June 679) was an East Anglian princess, a Fenland and Northumbrian queen and Abbess of Ely. She is an Anglo-Saxon saint, and is also known as Etheldreda or Audrey, especially in religious contexts. She was a daughter of Anna, King of East Anglia, and her siblings were Wendreda and Seaxburh of Ely, both of whom eventually retired from secular life and founded abbeys. Æthelthryth was "in turns, princess, wife, queen, nun and abbess, enjoying every possible position of power a woman could claim in early Anglo-Saxon England".

== Hagiography ==
There are a number of accounts of Æthelthryth's life in Latin, Old English, Old French, and Middle English. According to Jocelyn Wogan-Browne, "more medieval vernacular lives [about Æthelthryth] were composed in England than any other native female saint". Æthelthryth appears in Bede's Ecclesiastical History of the English People, Ælfric's Lives of Saints, Goscelin of Saint-Bertin's Lives of Female Saints, the Liber Eliensis, Marie de France's La vie seinte Audree, the South English Legendary, and a Middle English life in BL Cotton Faustina B.iii, among others.

== Life ==
The earliest account of Æthelthryth's life comes in Bede's Ecclesiastical History, Book iv.19, in which Bede calls her 'the virgin mother of many virgins'. Æthelthryth was probably born in Exning, near Newmarket in Suffolk. She was one of the four saintly daughters of Anna of East Anglia, including Wendreda and Seaxburh of Ely, all of whom retired from secular life and founded abbeys.

Æthelthryth made an early first marriage in around 652 to Tondberct, chief or prince of the South Gyrwe. Throughout the marriage, she maintained her vow of perpetual virginity that she had made. Upon Tondberct's death in 655, she retired to the Isle of Ely that she had received from Tondberct as a morning gift.

Æthelthryth was remarried for political reasons in 660, this time to Ecgfrith of Northumbria, who was fourteen or fifteen at the time. Shortly after his accession to the throne in 670, Æthelthryth wished to become a nun. This step contributed to Ecgfrith's quarrel with Wilfrid, bishop of York, who was Æthelthryth's confessor.

One account relates that while Ecgfrith initially agreed Æthelthryth could remain a virgin, about 672 he appealed to Wilfrid for the enforcement of his marital rights. The bishop succeeded at first in persuading the king to consent that Æthelthryth should live for some time in peace as a sister of the Coldingham nunnery, founded by his aunt, Æbbe of Coldingham. Eventually, in light of the danger of being forcibly carried off by the king, Æthelthryth fled back to the Isle of Ely with two nuns as companions. They evaded capture, thanks in part to the rising of the tide.

Another version of the legend related that Æthelthryth halted on the journey at 'Stow' and sheltered under a miraculously growing ash tree which sprung from her staff planted in the ground. Stow came to be known as 'St Etheldred's Stow', when a church was built to commemorate this event (although 'Stow' may actually refer to another fair, near Threekingham).

Ecgfrith later married Eormenburg and expelled Wilfrid from his kingdom in 678.

According to the Anglo-Saxon Chronicle, Æthelthryth founded Ely Abbey, a double monastery at Ely in 673, which was later destroyed in the Danish invasion of 870.

== Death, burial, and miracle ==
The Kingdom of East Anglia (early Anglo-Saxon period)

According to Bede, Æthelthryth died of a neck tumour, which she interpreted as sent by God in his goodness to relieve her of guilt for her vanity in having worn heavy necklaces in her youth.

Bede states that after her death, her bones were disinterred by her sister and successor, Seaxburh and that her uncorrupted body was later buried in a white, marble coffin.

In 695, Seaxburh translated the remains of her sister Æthelthryth, who had been dead for sixteen years, from a common grave to the new church at Ely. The Liber Eliensis describes these events in detail. When her grave was opened, Æthelthryth's body was discovered to be uncorrupted and her coffin and clothes proved to possess miraculous powers. A sarcophagus made of white marble was taken from the Roman ruins at Grantchester, which was found to be the right fit for Æthelthryth. Seaxburh supervised the preparation of her sister's body, which was washed and wrapped in new robes before being reburied. She oversaw the translation of her sister's remains without the supervision of her bishop, using her knowledge of procedures gained from her family's links with the Faremoutiers Abbey as a basis for the ceremony.

After Seaxburh, Æthelthryth's niece and her great-niece, both of whom were royal princesses, succeeded her as abbess of Ely.

== Legacy ==
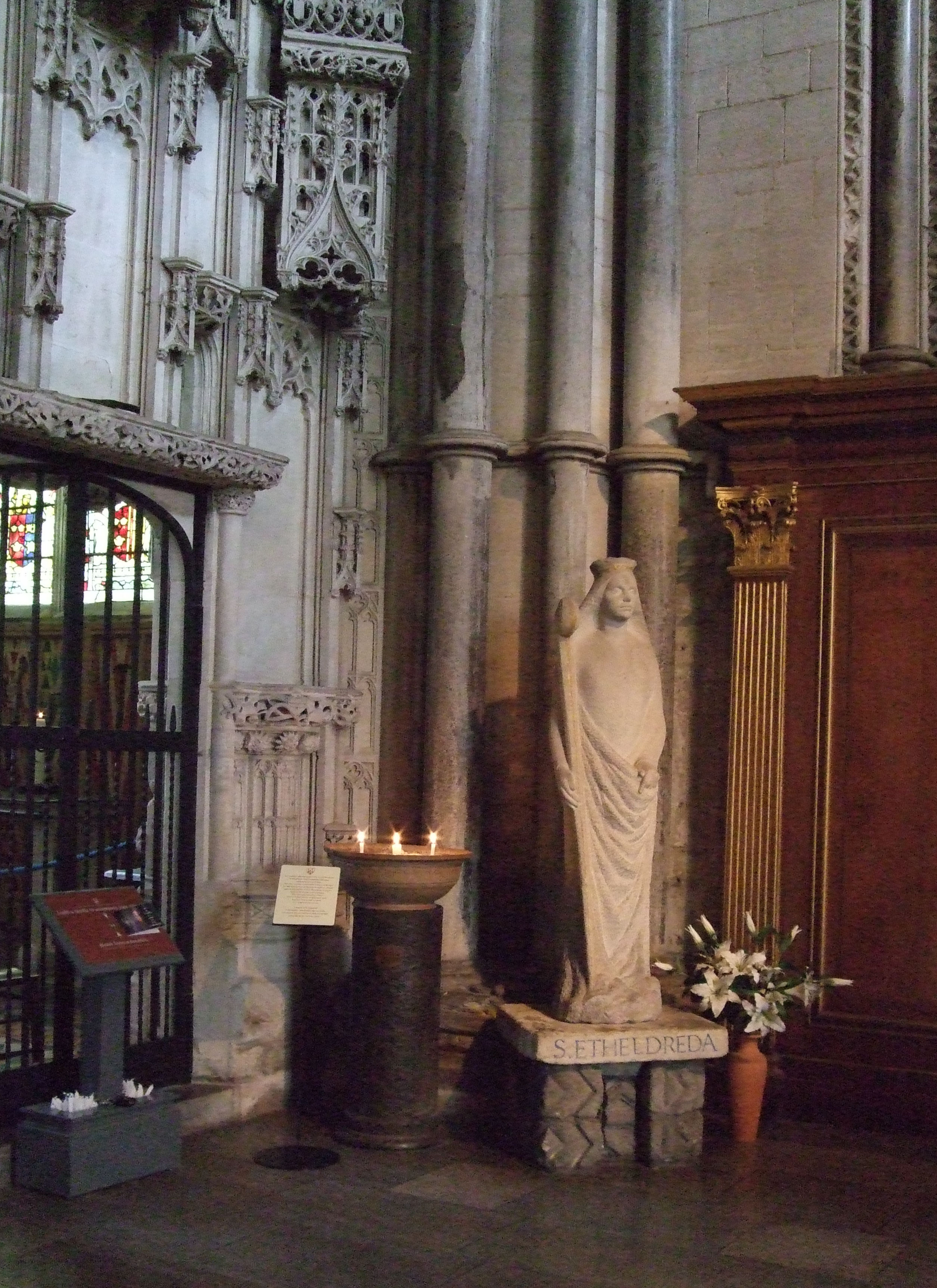
Saint Etheldreda's statue in Ely Cathedral

=== Festival ===
Æthelthryth, as Etheldreda, is remembered in the Church of England with a Lesser Festival on 17 October according to Book of Common Prayer tradition, and alternatively 23 June in the Common Worship calendar of Saints.

=== Namesake Churches ===
St Etheldreda's Church in Ely Place in Holborn is dedicated to the saint. It was originally part of the London palace of the bishops of Ely. After the English Reformation, part was briefly used by a Spanish ambassador for Catholic worship. The chapel was purchased by the Catholic Church in 1874 and is one of the oldest churches in England to be in current use by the Catholic Church.

St Etheldreda's Church, Hatfield is 13th century and was originally Anglo-Saxon. It was named for St Etheldreda because it was adjacent to a palace of the Bishops of Ely who held her as their patron saint.

St Etheldreda's is a Catholic parish church in Ely, Cambridgeshire. It is part of the Diocese of East Anglia within the province of Westminster. The church contains the shrine and relics of Æthelthryth, including her hand.

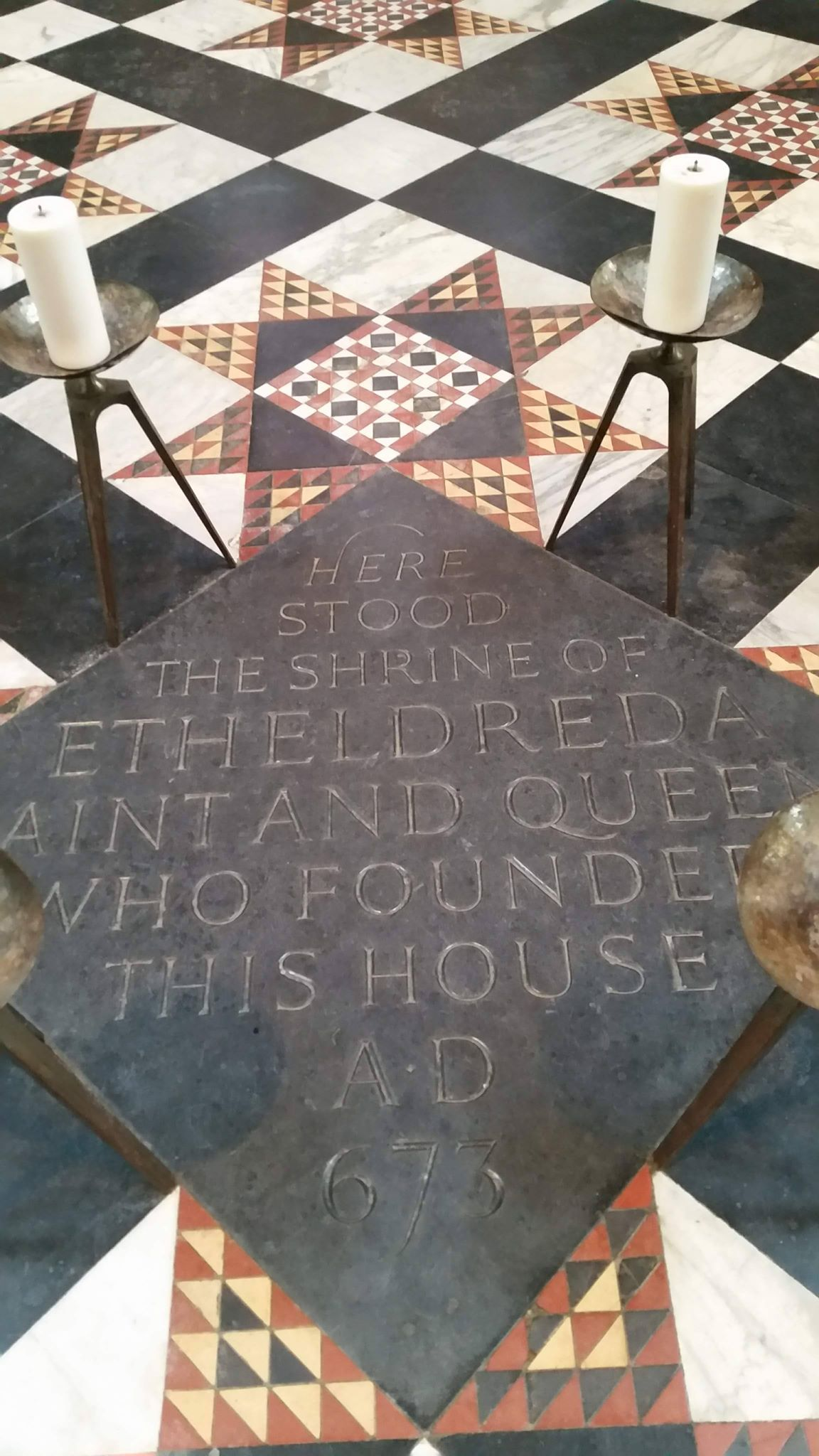
Site of shrine in Ely Cathedral

St Etheldreda's Church in White Notley, Essex, is a Church of England parish church, of Anglo-Saxon construction, built on the site of a Roman temple, with a large quantity of Roman brick in its fabric. The church has a small Mediaeval English stained-glass window, depicting St Etheldreda, which is set in a stone frame made from a very early Insular Christian Roman Chi Rho grave marker.

The church of St Etheldreda Histon, perhaps a shrine on the pilgrimage route to Ely, was demolished in 1599 and the material used in part to build Madingley Hall; that church is commemorated in a stained glass window.

=== Language ===
The common version of Æthelthryth's name was St Audrey, which is the origin of the word tawdry, which derived from the fact that her admirers bought modestly concealing lace goods at an annual fair held in her name in Ely. By the 17th century, this lacework had become seen as old-fashioned, vain, or cheap and of poor quality, at a time when the Puritans of eastern England disdained ornamental dress.

=== Visual art and fiction ===
Artists and writers have created work in response to Æthelthryth's story, including:

- Robert Pygot (1455), Panel Painting Painting of the Life of St. Ethelreda, "one of only two surviving pictorial cycles of St Etheldreda's legend".
- Moyra Caldecott, Etheldreda (2005), a fictional account of Æthelthryth's life.

== See also ==
- List of Anglo-Saxon saints
- Saint Æthelthryth, patron saint archive
- Wuffingas
- The hymn "Aethelthryth" by the Venerable Bede

== Sources ==
- Bede (1994). McClure, Judith; Collins, Roger (eds.). The Ecclesiastical History of the English People. Oxford, UK: Oxford University Press. ISBN 978-0-19-953723-5.
- Blanton, Virginia (2007) Signs of Devotion: the cult of St Aethelthryth in medieval England, 695–1615. University Park, Pa: Pennsylvania State University Press ISBN 0-271-02984-6
  - "Table of contents for Signs of Devotion". Library of Congress.
- Dockray-Miller, B. (2009) Saints Edith and Æthelthryth: Princesses, Miracle Workers, and their Late Medieval Audience; the Wilton Chronicle and the Wilton Life of St Æthelthryth, Turnhout: Brepols Publishers ISBN 978-2-503-52836-6
- Fairweather, Janet, ed. (2005). Liber Eliensis: A History of the Isle of Ely from the Seventh Century to the Twelfth. Translated by Fairweather, Janet. Woodbridge, UK: The Boydell Press. ISBN 978-1-84383-015-3.
- Farmer, David (2011). The Oxford Dictionary of Saints (5th revised ed.). Oxford, UK: Oxford University Press. ISBN 978-0-19-959660-7.
- Maccarron, Máirín, "The Adornment of Virgins: Æthelthryth and Her Necklaces," in Elizabeth Mullins and Diarmuid Scully (eds), Listen, O Isles, unto me: Studies in Medieval Word and Image in honour of Jennifer O’Reilly (Cork, 2011), 142–155.
- Major, Tristan, "Saint Etheldreda in the South English Legendary," Anglia 128.1 (2010), 83–101.
- McCash, June Hall & Judith Clark Barban, ed. and trans. (2006) The Life of Saint Audrey; a text by Marie de France. Jefferson, NC: McFarland ISBN 0-7864-2653-5
- Ridyard, Susan (1988). The Royal Saints of Anglo-Saxon England. Cambridge, UK: Cambridge University Press. ISBN 978-0-521-30772-7.
- Wogan-Browne, Jocelyn, "Rerouting the Dower: The Anglo-Norman Life of St. Audrey by Marie (of Chatteris?)", in Power of the Weak: Studies on Medieval Women, ed. Jennifer Carpenter and Sally-Beth Maclean (Champaign: University of Illinois Press, 1995), 27–56.
