= December 15 (Eastern Orthodox liturgics) =

Day in the Eastern Orthodox liturgical calendar

Eastern Orthodox liturgical calendar
December 14	December 15	December 16
December 15 O.S. ≍ December 28 N.S. December 15 N.S ≍ December 2 O.S.

An Eastern Orthodox cross

December 15 in Eastern Orthodox liturgical calendars is a feast day and a day of commemoration of saints and martyrs. Although some Orthodox churches use the Revised Julian Calendar and others use the traditional Julian calendar, the fixed commemorations for their respective December 15 are broadly the same, no matter which calendar is used. (Note: Despite the dates being the same, the days to which they refer typically differ by 13 days. The notation Old Style or O.S. is sometimes used to indicate a date in the traditional Julian Calendar (the "Old Calendar"). The notation New Style or N.S. indicates a date in the Revised Julian calendar (the "New Calendar").)

== Saints ==
- Hieromartyr Eleutherius, Bishop of Illyricum (Illyria), and Martyrs Anthia (his mother), Coremonus (Corybus, Corivus) the Eparch, and two executioners who suffered with them (117–138)
- Martyr Eleutherius of Byzantium (beginning of the 4th century) (see also: August 4)
- Martyr Susanna the Deaconess, Joanna in monasticism, of Palestine (4th century)
- Venerable Pardus the Hermit of Palestine (6th century)
- Saint Stephen the Confessor, Archbishop of Surozh in the Crimea (c. 790)
- Monk-Martyr Bacchus the New of St. Sabbas Monastery, by beheading (787)
- Venerable Paul the New Ascetic of Mt. Latros (896 or 956)

== Pre-Schism Western saints ==
- Saint Valerian of Abbenza, Bishop of Abbenza in North Africa (457) (Note: Bishop of Abbenza in North Africa who, aged over eighty, was left to die of exposure for refusing to give up the sacred vessels. He died under the Arian Genseric King of the Vandals.)
- Martyrs Faustinus, Lucius, Candidus, Caelian, Mark, Januarius and Fortunatus, in North Africa
- Saint Mesmin (Maximin, Maximinus), first Abbot of Micy (Saint-Mesmin de Micy Abbey) near Orleans in France (520)
- Saint Aubertus, Bishop of Cambrai-Arras, Netherlands (668) (see also: December 13)
- Saint Florentius (Flann), Abbot of Bangor Abbey in Ireland (7th century)
- Saint Offa of Essex, King of Essex in England, he went to Rome and took up the monastic life (c. 709) (Note: "OFFA succeeded his father Sighere as King of the East Saxons in 704. He was a youth of most noble aspect, in the flower of his age, and most dearly beloved by his people, with the prospect of a long and happy reign. He had entered into an agreement with the family of King Penda to contract a marriage with Kyneswida, the daughter of that prince. But she had resolved to consecrate her virginity to a heavenly Spouse, and in her trouble, on hearing the designs of her kindred, had recourse to the intercession of the Queen of Virgins. Her prayer was heard, and not only was she able to maintain her purpose, but her persuasions so touched the heart of Offa, that he too chose the better part, and after a short reign of four years resigned his kingdom and went on a pilgrimage to Rome, in company with St. Egwin, Bishop of Worcester, and Kenred, King of Mercia, and nephew of the virgin Kyneswida, who had the same pious purpose as himself. In Rome, Offa took the monastic habit, and persevered in that state until called to the heavenly kingdom, on which his heart was set.")
- Saint Urbicius (Urbitius, Úrbez) of Huesca (c. 805) (Note: By tradition he was born in Bordeaux and became a monk in France but became a prisoner of the Saracens and was taken to Spain. He managed to escape and settled as a hermit in the valley of Nocito in the Pyrenees near Huesca.)
- Saint Adalbero (Adalbero II of Upper Lorraine), a monk at the monastery of Gorze in France, became Bishop of Verdun, but was transferred to Metz (1005)

== Post-Schism Orthodox saints ==
- Saint Nectarius of Bitel (Nektarios of Bitola, Nektarij Bitolski) (1500) (Note: The Monk Nektarii of Bitel'sk. HOLY TRINITY RUSSIAN ORTHODOX CHURCH (A parish of the Patriarchate of Moscow).)
- Saint Tryphon of Pechenga, Kola Peninsula, "Enlightener of the Lapps" (1583)

=== New martyrs and confessors ===
- New Martyr Jonah, disciple of Saint Tryphon of Pechenga (1589–1590) (Note: Saint Jonah of Pechenga and Kola was, as tradition tells us, a priest in the city of Kola. After the death of his daughter and wife he went off to the Pechenga-Trinity Monastery near Kola, and became a disciple of its founder, St. Tryphon. After the death of his teacher, he settled in 1583 at the site of what was to become his grave in the neighboring Dormition wilderness, where he was killed by the Swedes in the year 1590.) (Note: See: (in Russian) Иона Печенгский. Википедии. (Russian Wikipedia).)
- New Hieromartyr Hilarion Troitsky, Archbishop of Vereya (Verey) (1929) (Note: See: (in Russian) Иларион (Троицкий). Википедии. (Russian Wikipedia).)
- New Hieromartyrs Alexander Rozhdestvensky and Basil Vinogradov, Priests of Tver (1937)
- New Hieromartyr Victorinus Dobronravov, Archpriest (1937) (Note: See: (in Russian) Добронравов, Викторин Михайлович. Википедии. (Russian Wikipedia).)

== Other commemorations ==
- Sunday of the Holy Forefathers of Jesus Christ (December 11–17)
- Commemoration of the ordination of Saint John Chrysostom as the Patriarch of Constantinople (15 December 397)
- Birthday (1872) of New Hieromartyr Joseph Petrovykh, Metropolitan of Saint Petersburg (ru) (1938) (Note: He is considered the leader of the anti-Bolshevik church movement in the USSR and the founder of the Catacomb Church (Josephite movement).) (see: November 7 - feast day)
- Synaxis of the Saints of the Crimea
- Synaxis of the Saints of Kola (Kolsk) (Note: See: (in Russian) Собор Кольских святых. Википедии. (Russian Wikipedia).)

== Icon gallery ==
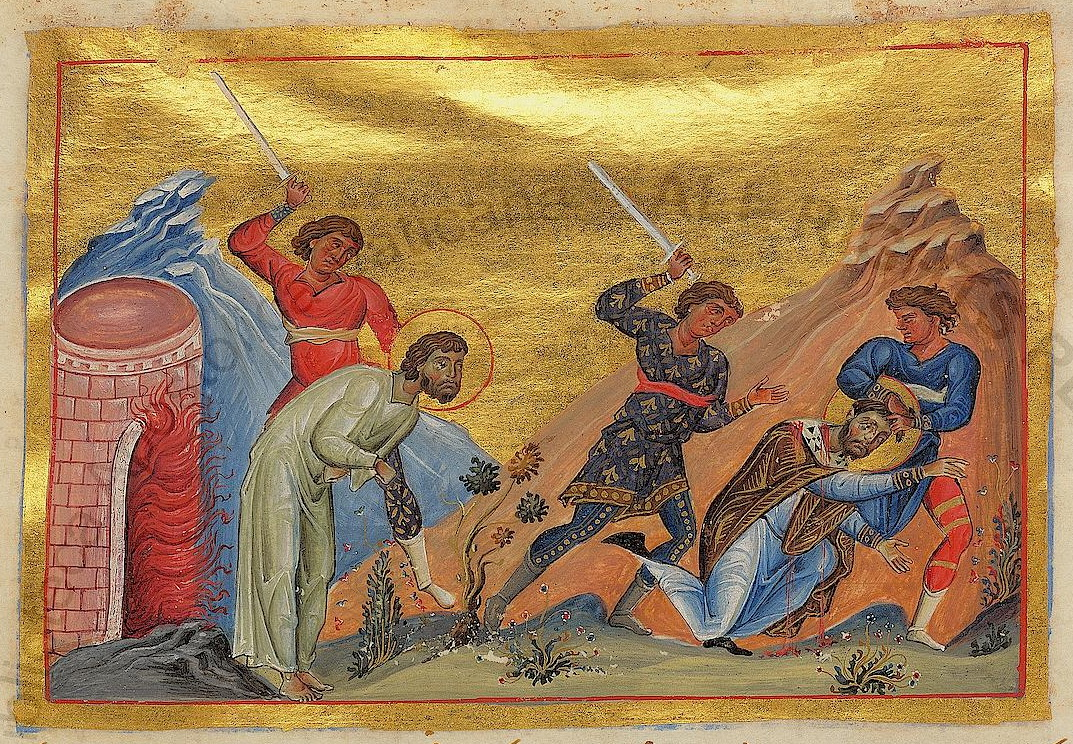
St. Eleutherius, Bishop of Illyria.
(Menologion of Basil II, 10th century).

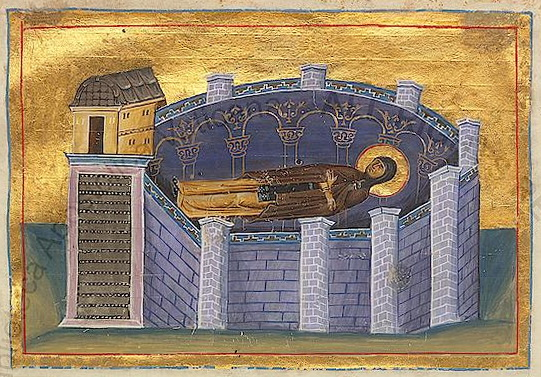
Martyr Susanna the Deaconess, Joanna in monasticism, of Palestine.
(Menologion of Basil II, 10th century).

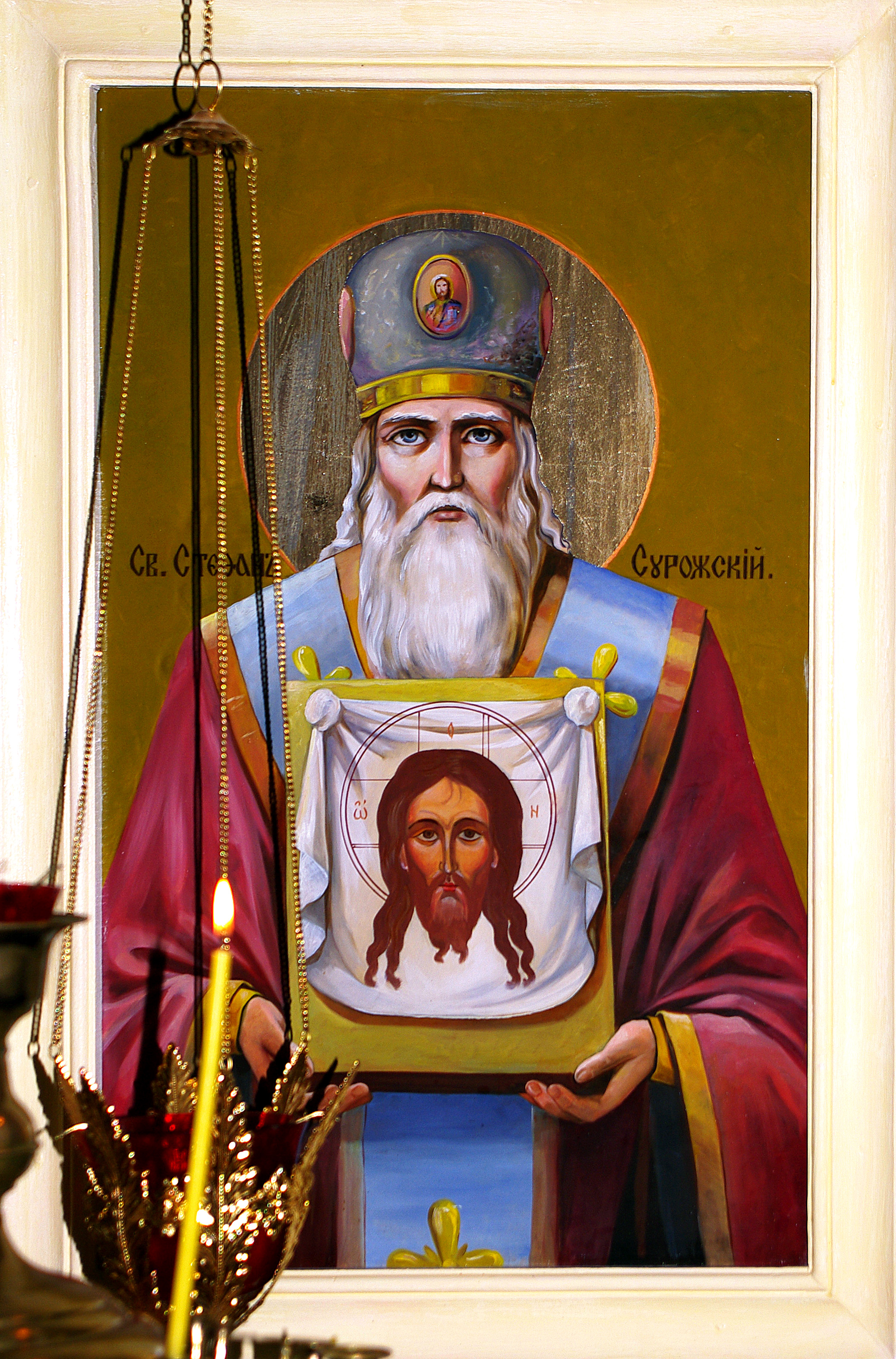
St. Stephen the Confessor, Archbishop of Surozh in the Crimea.

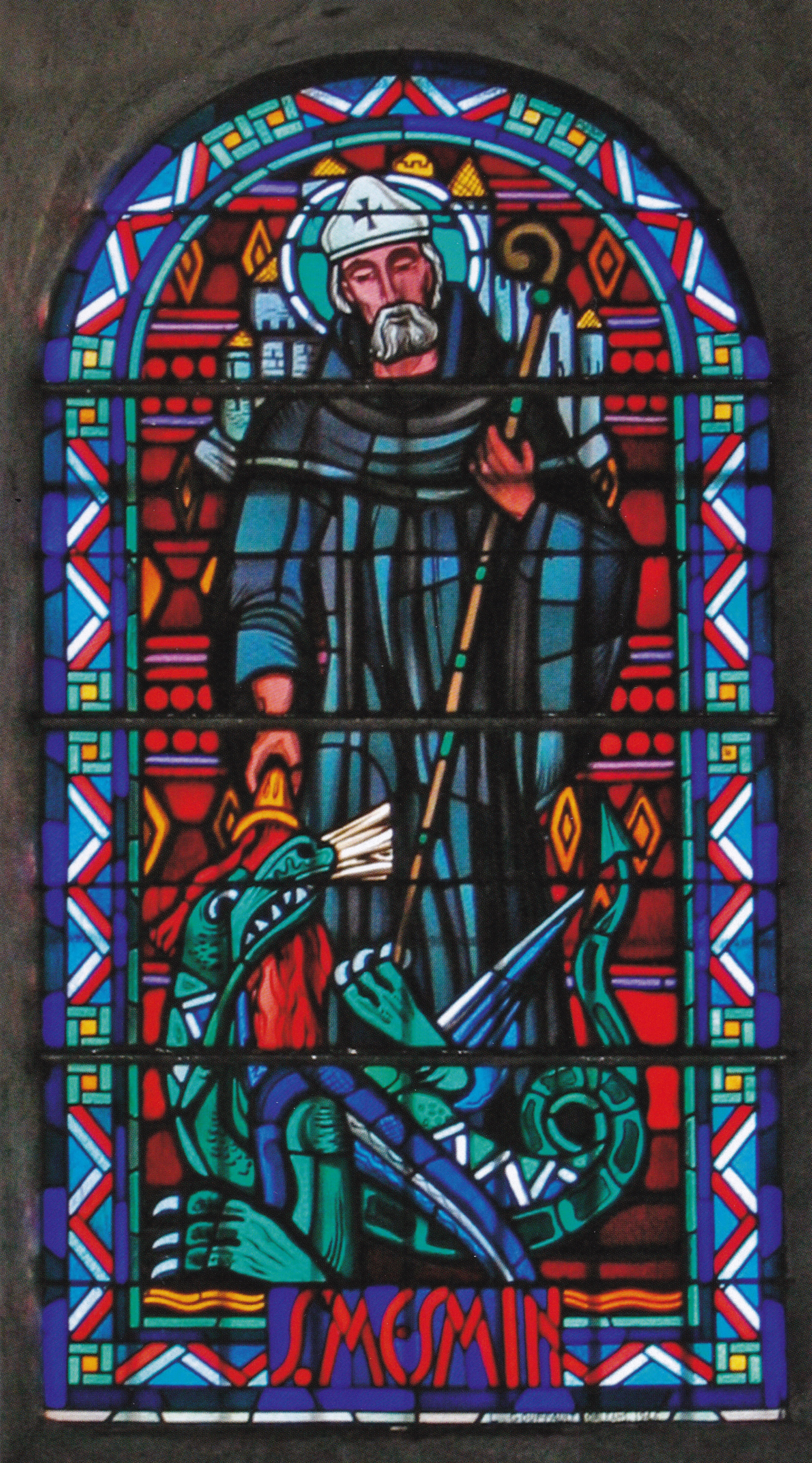
St. Mesmin (Maximinus), first Abbot of Micy.

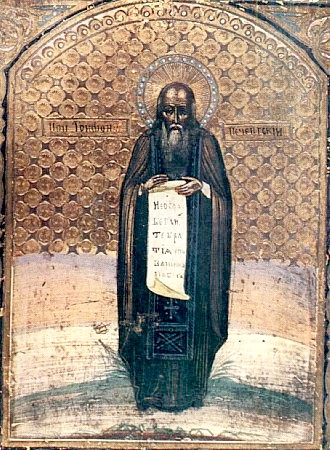
St. Tryphon of Pechenga, Enlightener of the Lapps.

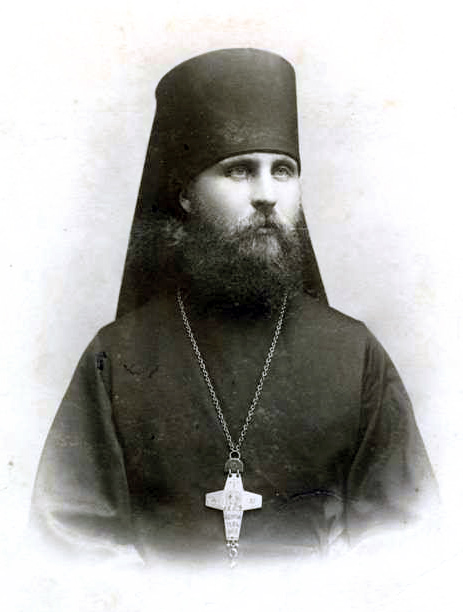
New Hieromartyr Hilarion (Troitsky), Archbishop of Verey.

New Hieromartyr Joseph Petrovykh, Metropolitan of Saint Petersburg.

== Sources ==
- December 15/28. Orthodox Calendar (PRAVOSLAVIE.RU).
- December 28 / December 15. HOLY TRINITY RUSSIAN ORTHODOX CHURCH (A parish of the Patriarchate of Moscow).
- December 15. OCA – The Lives of the Saints.
- The Autonomous Orthodox Metropolia of Western Europe and the Americas (ROCOR). St. Hilarion Calendar of Saints for the year of our Lord 2004. St. Hilarion Press (Austin, TX). p. 93.
- December 15. Latin Saints of the Orthodox Patriarchate of Rome.
- The Roman Martyrology. Transl. by the Archbishop of Baltimore. Last Edition, According to the Copy Printed at Rome in 1914. Revised Edition, with the Imprimatur of His Eminence Cardinal Gibbons. Baltimore: John Murphy Company, 1916.

Greek Sources

- Great Synaxaristes: (in Greek) 15 ΔΕΚΕΜΒΡΙΟΥ. ΜΕΓΑΣ ΣΥΝΑΞΑΡΙΣΤΗΣ.
- (in Greek) Συναξαριστής. 15 Δεκεμβρίου. ECCLESIA.GR. (H ΕΚΚΛΗΣΙΑ ΤΗΣ ΕΛΛΑΔΟΣ).

Russian Sources

- (in Russian) 28 декабря (15 декабря). Православная Энциклопедия под редакцией Патриарха Московского и всея Руси Кирилла (электронная версия). (Orthodox Encyclopedia – Pravenc.ru).
- (in Russian) 15 декабря (ст.ст.) 28 декабря 2014 (нов. ст.). Русская Православная Церковь Отдел внешних церковных связей. (DECR).
