= List of Merovingian monasteries =

This is a list of monasteries founded during the Merovingian period, between the years c. 500 and c. 750. The abbeys are not 'Merovingian' as such, although there are quite a few monasteries which were founded under royal Merovingian patronage, especially in the 7th and early 8th centuries.

Abbey	Location (present-day)	Foundation date (traditional)	Founder (traditional)	First abbot/abbess
Altaripa Abbey				
Altmünster Abbey	Luxembourg City			
Altomünster Abbey	Altomünster	c. 750	Alto	
Amorbach Abbey	Amorbach	734	Amor, disciple of Pirmin	Amor
Andernach Abbey	Andernach			
Annegray Abbey	La Voivre, Haute-Saône	c.585-590	Columbanus	Columbanus
Argenteuil Abbey	Argenteuil	656 / first mentioned 697		
Barisis au Bois Abbey	Barisis-aux-Bois			
Benedictbeuren Abbey	Benediktbeuern	c.740, 969 (2nd creation, by Wolfold)		
Bobbio Abbey	Bobbio	614	Columbanus	Columbanus
Abbey of Bruyères-le-Châtel	Bruyères-le-Châtel	673	Chlotilde	Mummola
Chelles Abbey	Chelles, Seine-et-Marne	c.658	Balthild	
Chiemsee Abbey	Chiemsee			
Saint Peter Abbey, Corbie	Corbie	c.660	Balthild	Theofred
Dol Abbey	Dol-de-Bretagne	6th century	Samson of Dol	
Echternach Abbey	Echternach	c. 698	Willibrord	Willibrord
Elnone	Saint-Amand-les-Eaux	c. 633	Amandus	Amandus
Faremoutiers Abbey	Faremoutiers	c.620	Burgundofara	
Fécamp Abbey	Fécamp	658	Waningus	
Ferrières Abbey	Ferrières-en-Gâtinais	630	Columbanus	
Saint Peter Abbey, Flavigny	Flavigny-sur-Ozerain	717/19	Widerad	Magnaoald
Fleury Abbey	Saint-Benoît-sur-Loire	c.640	Leodebaldus	Rigomer?
Fritzlar Abbey (Frideslar)	Fritzlar	724	Boniface	
Gorze Abbey	Gorze	749	Chrodegang of Metz	Droctegand
Fontanella Abbey	Saint-Wandrille-Rançon	648	Wandregisel	Wandregisel
Fulda Abbey	Fulda	744	Sturm	Sturm
Hautmont Abbey	Hautmont	646?	Vincent Madelgarius	Madelgar, named Vincentius
Hautvillers Abbey	Hautvillers			
Hersfeld Abbey	Bad Hersfeld	736, again 769	Sturm	
Holy Cross Abbey, Poitiers	Poitiers	552/8	Radegunde	Agnes
Holzkirchen Abbey	Holzkirchen, Lower Franconia			
Honau Abbey	La Wantzenau			
Hornbach Abbey	Hornbach, Germany			
Abbey Notre-Dame de Jouarre	Jouarre	c. 630	Ado	Theodechilde
Saint Peter Abbey, Jumièges	Jumièges	654	Philibert	Philibert
Kaiserwerth Abbey	Düsseldorf-Kaiserswerth			
Kempten Abbey	Kempten			
Kitzingen Abbey	Kitzingen			
Kochel Abbey	Kochel			
Saint Lambert Abbey, Liessies	Liessies	c. 751	Wilbert	Guntrad
Lobbes Abbey	Lobbes	c. 650	Landelin	Ursmar?
Loches Abbey	Loches			
Lorch Abbey				
Saint Peter and Paul Abbey, Luxeuil	Luxeuil-les-Bains	c.585/90	Columbanus	Columbanus
Marmoutier Abbey	Marmoutier	c.589 or 659?	Leobard?	Leobard
Maroilles Abbey	Maroilles	c. 650	Radobert	Humbert
Mettlach Abbey	Mettlach	c. 676	Leudwinus	
Mondsee Abbey	Mondsee (town)	748	Odilo of Bavaria	
Mont-St-Michel Abbey	Mont-Saint-Michel	708	Aubert	
Montier-en-Der Abbey	Montier-en-Der	Ca 670	Berchar(ius)	
Murbach Abbey	Murbach	727	Pirmin	
Nantua Abbey	Nantua	c.660	Amandus	
Saint Maurice Abbey, Niederaltaich	Niederalteich	731 or 741	Odilo of Bavaria	Eberswind
Nivelles Abbey	Nivelles	c.640	Gertrude of Nivelles	
Noirmoutier Abbey	Noirmoutier	674	Philibert	
Saint Junian Abbey, Nouaillé-Maupertuis	Nouaillé-Maupertuis	6th century	Junian	Junian
Novalese Abbey	Novalesa	726	Abbo of Provence	
Ochsenfurt Abbey	Ochsenfurt			
Orbais Abbey	Orbais-l'Abbaye			
Péronne Abbey				
Prüm Abbey	Prüm	720/21	Bertrada of Prüm and Caribert of Laon	Angloard
Rebais Abbey	Rebais	630s	Audoin of Rouen	
Reichenau Abbey	Reichenau	724	Pirmin	
Abbey of Reuil-en-Brie	Reuil-en-Brie	7th century	Rado	
Abbey of Saint-Sauveur, Sarlat	Sarlat	8th century?		
Saint-Andoche Abbey	Autun	592	Brunhilde	Thalassia
Saint-Aubin d’Angers	Angers	Before 616		Bobenus?
Saint Bavo Abbey, Ghent	Ghent	c. 630	Amandus	
Sainte Colombe Abbey, Sens	Sens	620	Chlothar II	Aggo ?
Saint Denis Abbey	Saint-Denis	623/39	Dagobert I	
Saint Eloi Abbey	Noyon	645	Eligius	
Saint Emmeran Abbey	Regensburg	c. 739		Gaubald
Saint-Germain-des-Prés	Paris	c. 557	Germanus	Doctroyée
Saint Gall Abbey	Sankt Gallen	719?	Othmar	Othmar
Abbey of Saint Genevieve	Paris	502?	Chlodowech & Saint Clotilde	
Saint Glossinde Abbey	Metz	c. 604	Glossinde	Glossinde
St Hubert Abbey	Saint-Hubert, Belgium			
Saint Lucian Abbey	Beauvais	c. 583/5	Chilperic I?	Ebrulf
Sainte-Marie de Saint-Jean-le-Grand Abbey	Autun	Bef. 589	Syagrius of Autun	Thalassia
Saint Martin Abbey	Autun	Bef. 589	Syagrius of Autun	Lupus
Saint Maurice d'Agaune Abbey	Saint-Maurice	515	Sigismund of Burgundy	
Saint Medard Abbey	Soissons	557	Chlothar I	
Saint Mesmin Abbey	Micy	ca. 508	Euspicius	Euspicius
Saint Michael Abbey, Mihiel	Saint-Mihiel	c. 709 [first mention]	Wulfoad?	
St Nazaire Abbey				
Saint Bertin Abbey, Sithiu	Saint-Omer	c. 654	Audomar	Bertin
Saint Peter Abbey	Remiremont	Ca 620	Romaric	Amatus [men], Mactefleda [women]
Saint Peter Abbey, Ghent	Ghent	631?	Amandus	
Saint Peter Abbey, Solignac	Solignac	631/2	Eligius	Remaclus
Saint Pierre de la Couture	Le Mans	bef. 616	Bertechramn of Le Mans	
Saint-Pierre-le-Vif, Sens	Sens	First half 6th century?	Theudechild	
Saint Pierre-le-Bas Abbey	Vienne	6th century	Leonianus	Leonianus
Saint Peter and Saint Paul Abbey	Wissembourg	bef. 661	Austrasian nobles	Principius of Speyer?
Saint Quentin Abbey	Mont Saint Quentin	ca. 660	Chlodovech II	Ultan?
St Riquier Abbey, Centula	Saint-Riquier	625/38	Richarius	Richarius
Saint Symphorian Abbey	Metz	c. 609	Pappolus	
Saint Trond Abbey	Sint-Truiden	656?	Trudo	
Saint Vaast Abbey	Arras	667	Audebert	
Staffelsee Abbey	Staffelsee			
Stavelot-Malmédy Abbey	Stavelot, Malmedy	c.650	Remaclus	
Tauberbischofsheim Abbey	Tauberbischofsheim	Bef. 754	Boniface	Leoba
Tegernsee Abbey	Tegernsee	c.746 or c.765		

== Sources ==
- Ian Wood, The Frankish Kingdoms 450-750
- J. M. Wallace-Hadrill, The Long-haired Kings [and other studies in Frankish History] (1962)
- Gregory of Tours, Decem Libri Historianum

== See also ==
- Merovingian architecture
- Merovingian art
- Merovingian dynasty
- Merovingian script
