= Château de Meung-sur-Loire =

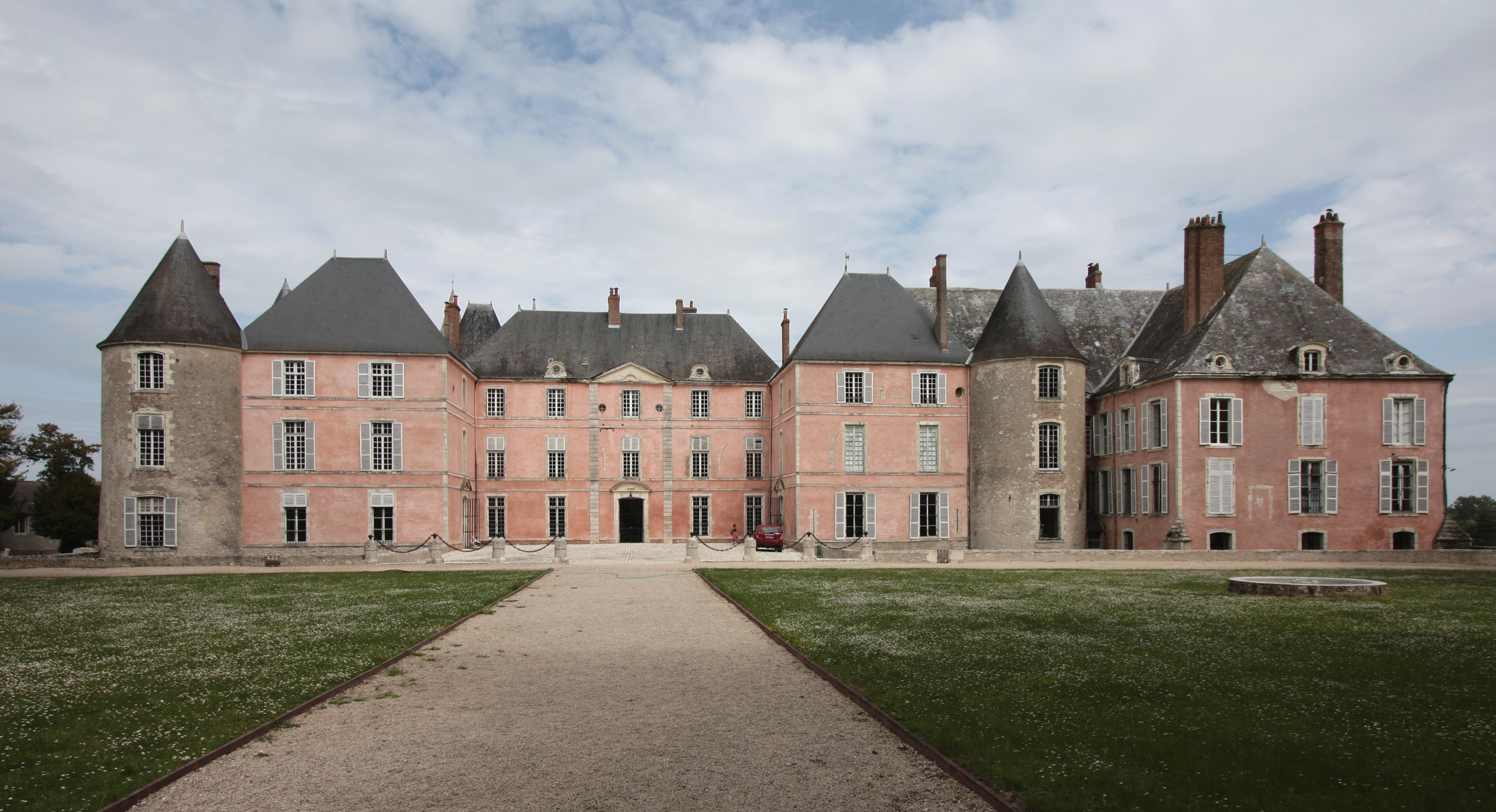
- The medieval façade of the château
- Interactive map of Château de Meung-sur-Loire
- 47.8234°N 1.6944°E
- Type: Castle
- Location: Meung-sur-Loire, Loiret, Centre-Val de Loire, France

History
- Built: 12th–18th centuries

Site notes
- Sculptor: François-Nicolas Delaistre
- Architectural styles: Medieval, Classical
- Website: chateau-de-meung.com

Monument historique
- Designated: 1988 (listed), 2004 (classified)
- Reference no.: PA00098818

The Château de Meung-sur-Loire is a former castle and episcopal palace in the commune of Meung-sur-Loire in the Loiret département of France. Built and remodelled between the 12th and 18th centuries, it served for most of its history as a residence of the bishops of Orléans. It is sometimes called the "château with two faces" because of the contrast between its medieval town-facing façade and its 18th-century classical garden façade.

The château, located next to the collegial church, was the country residence of the Bishops of Orléans. It was built and destroyed several times. The oldest still existing parts date from the 12th century and were built by Manassès de Seignelay (bishop from 1207 to 1221). Still standing is the main rectangular plan building, flanked by three towers, a fourth having been destroyed. The English occupied it during the Hundred Years' War. The rear façade was rebuilt in the Classical style by Fleuriau d'Armenonville (bishop from 1706 to 1733). Beneath the castle are dungeons, a chapel and various medieval torture instruments, including one used for water torture.

The château and its park have been protected as a monument historique since 1988, with a further classification in 2004, and the site lies within the Loire Valley cultural landscape inscribed on the UNESCO World Heritage List in 2000. It has been privately owned and open to the public since the second half of the 20th century.

== Location ==
The château stands in the centre of the town of Meung-sur-Loire, about 500 metres north of the right bank of the Loire and some 15 kilometres downstream (south-west) of Orléans, adjoining the collegiate church of Saint-Liphard. The town railway station, on the Orléans–Blois line, is about 750 metres from the castle.

== History ==
=== Middle Ages ===
A castle at Meung is first attested at the beginning of the 12th century in the Life of Louis VI the Fat by Suger, who relates that around 1103 the bishop of Orléans called on King Philip I for help against an ambitious local lord, Léon de Meung.

Construction of the episcopal residence proper began in the mid-12th century under Manassès de Garlande, bishop of Orléans from 1147 to 1185, and was considerably enlarged in the early 13th century by bishop Manassès de Seignelay (1207–1221), to whom the oldest surviving parts of the main building are attributed: a rectangular main block flanked by round towers, built against the bell tower of the collegiate church.

=== Hundred Years' War and François Villon ===
During the Hundred Years' War the castle was held by the English and turned into a fortress, commanded by John Talbot and Thomas Scales. It was retaken by Joan of Arc and Jean II d'Alençon on 14 June 1429 at the Battle of Meung-sur-Loire, a few days before the French victory at the Battle of Patay.

In the 15th century the castle served as a prison of the episcopal justice system. Its best-known prisoner was the poet François Villon, detained in 1461 on the orders of the bishop of Orléans, Thibault d'Aussigny. Villon was released in October 1461 when Louis XI, passing through Meung, granted a general pardon; the opening stanzas of his Testament allude bitterly to this imprisonment.

=== Early modern period ===
Around 1500 a new range of buildings was added to the north, including a drawbridge tower. The castle was largely abandoned from the Wars of Religion at the end of the 16th century until the early 18th century.

From 1706, bishop Louis-Gaston Fleuriau d'Armenonville undertook to transform the fortress into a residence of pleasure, remodelling the 13th- and 16th-century parts and creating the great south-west façade framing a court of honour, as well as the south wing. In the second half of the 18th century, bishop Louis Sextius Jarente de La Bruyère continued the transformation, giving the garden front its classical appearance with rendered walls painted in an oxblood red; the neoclassical chapel, with sculpture by Delaistre, was completed in 1784, together with two pavilions in the grounds.

=== 19th century to the present ===
Confiscated at the French Revolution, the château passed into private hands and was acquired by the banker Jacques-Jean Le Couteulx du Molay, one of the founders of the Banque de France. It remained a private residence through the 19th and 20th centuries and was opened to the public in the second half of the 20th century.

Since 2010 the château has been owned by Élise and Xavier Lelevé. Since their acquisition, restoration and conservation work has been carried out on the historic buildings and the park.

== Architecture ==
The château juxtaposes two distinct architectural characters. The town-facing side retains its medieval appearance, with the ruins of the 12th-century Manassès towers and a fortified 13th-century façade flanked by round towers. The garden side, by contrast, presents an 18th-century classical façade with large window bays and rendered walls painted red, which has made it one of the relatively few painted châteaux in France.

Beneath the castle, underground galleries include a vaulted chapel and cells used as a prison under the episcopal justice system. The neoclassical chapel of 1784 and the 18th-century bathrooms are among the notable interior spaces; the building is presented fully furnished, with more than 2,000 objects displayed in over 25 rooms.

== Park ==
The château is surrounded by a park of about seven hectares in the town centre. Nothing survives of the formal French garden that once adorned the terrace, but traces remain of the English landscape park created shortly before the Revolution, including the beds of artificial "English" rivers and avenues of lime trees. The park has been a protected natural site (site classé) since 1942. The 18th-century poet Jacques Delille is said to have been inspired by the park in his poem Jardins.

== Heritage designations ==
The château was listed as a monument historique on 7 March 1988, the ruins of the earlier castle were classified on 8 September 1988, and a further classification followed on 26 January 2004. The château lies within the perimeter of the Loire Valley between Sully-sur-Loire and Chalonnes-sur-Loire, inscribed as a cultural landscape on the UNESCO World Heritage List in 2000.

== In popular culture ==
Alexandre Dumas opens The Three Musketeers (1844) in the town of Meung-sur-Loire, where d'Artagnan first encounters the Comte de Rochefort. The final scenes of Arturo Pérez-Reverte's novel The Club Dumas (1993) take place at the château.

== Visiting ==
The château is open to the public, with a visitor route running from the attics to the underground galleries, and family-oriented activities in the park.

== Currently ==
In 2016, the château hosted a fashion show shortly after Paris Fashion Week, celebrating historical fashion and displaying the evolution of fashion from antiquity to the First World War.

== See also ==
- List of castles in France
