= Laetus (disambiguation) =

A laetus was a foreigner permitted to settle in the Roman Empire.

Laetus may also refer to:

- Quintus Aemilius Laetus (died 193), Roman prefect of the Praetorian Guard
- Saint Laetus (died 553), hermit from Gaul
- Julius Pomponius Laetus (1428–1498), Italian humanist
