= Arboretum des Prés des Culands =

Private arboretum in Centre-Val de Loire, France

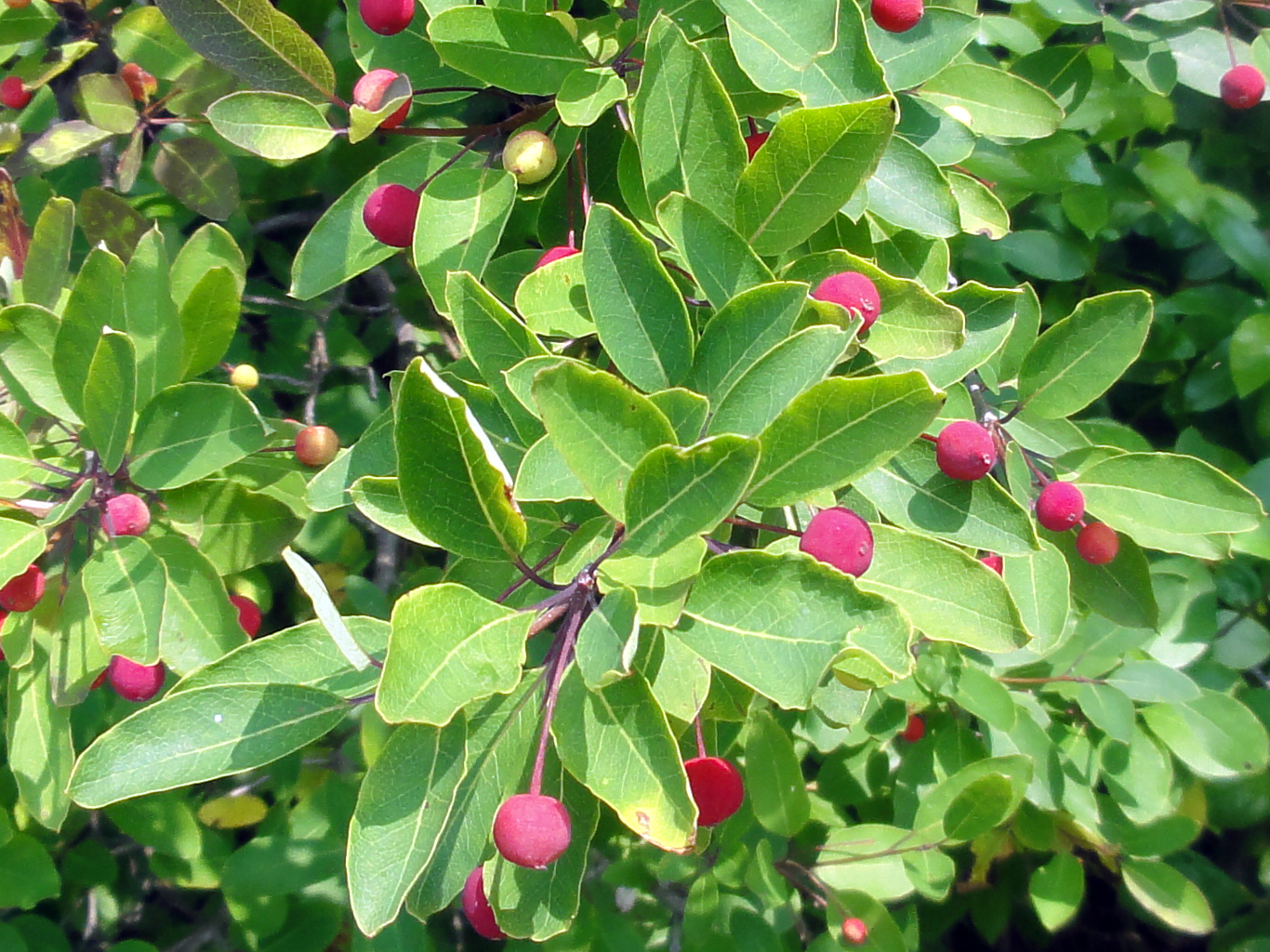
- Landscape of Arboretum des Prés des Culand
- Interactive map of Arboretum des Prés des Culands
- Type: Arboretum
- Location: Meung-sur-Loire, Loiret, Centre-Val de Loire, France
- Coordinates: 47.843°N 1.701°E
- Area: 2 hectares (4.9 acres)
- Created: 1987 by Pierre Paris
- Operator: Stéphane and Aline Chassine

The Arboretum des Prés des Culands (2 hectares), also known as the Conservatoire national d'Ilex, is a private arboretum specializing in Ilex (holly) varieties. It is located at La Nivelle, Meung-sur-Loire, Loiret, Centre-Val de Loire, France, and open by appointment; an admission fee is charged.

The arboretum was created in 1987 on marshlands, and landscaped as many small islands interconnected by wooden bridges. By 1991 it contained about 150 Ilex plants and was designated a national collection by the Conservatoire des Collections Végétales Spécialisées (CCVS). It was subsequently recognized by the Holly Society of America in 1999, and in 2004 named a Jardin Remarquable by the French ministry of culture. In 2007 its astilbe collection merited a second CCVS designation.

Today the garden contains over 500 types of Ilex obtained from botanical gardens and arboretums around the world, including some 60 species, 150 hybrids, and 250 varieties. It also contains fine plantings of astilbe, maples, bamboos, clematis, dogwood, and hydrangea, as well as conifers and aquatic plants.

== See also ==
- List of botanical gardens in France
