= Duralex Picardie tumbler =

French drinking glass

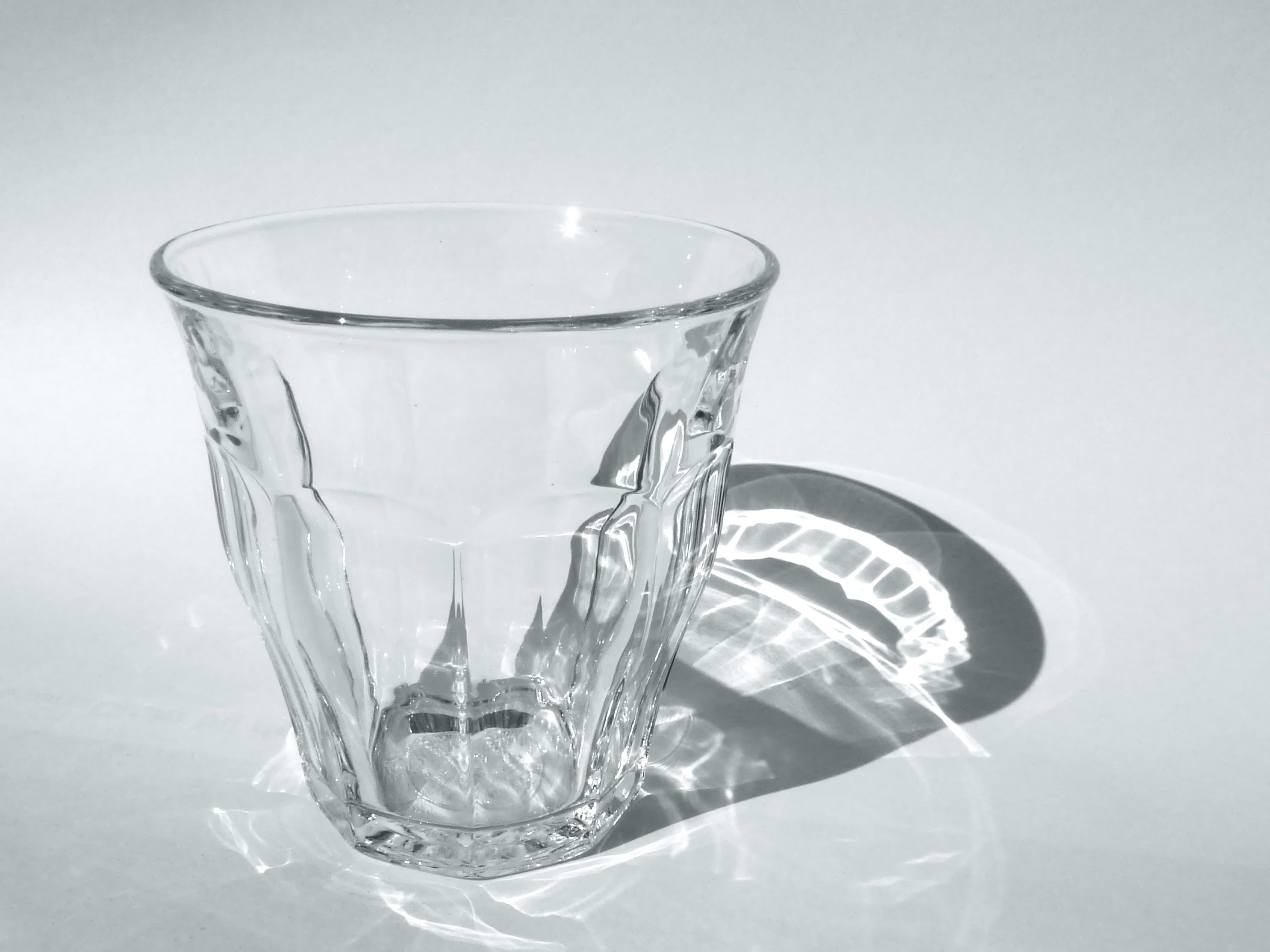
Picardie glass.

The Duralex Picardie is a classic design of a toughened glass tumbler found in cafes, schools and homes across France and in many places worldwide. It is manufactured by Duralex in La Chapelle-Saint-Mesmin in Loiret. The design has been produced in a range of sizes but they typically share markings on their bottoms with "MADE IN FRANCE" surrounding in circular design the name "DURALEX". The glasses are considered "icons of modern design" and are sold at the Museum of Modern Art.
