= Liphardus =

French abbot and saint

Saint Liphardus
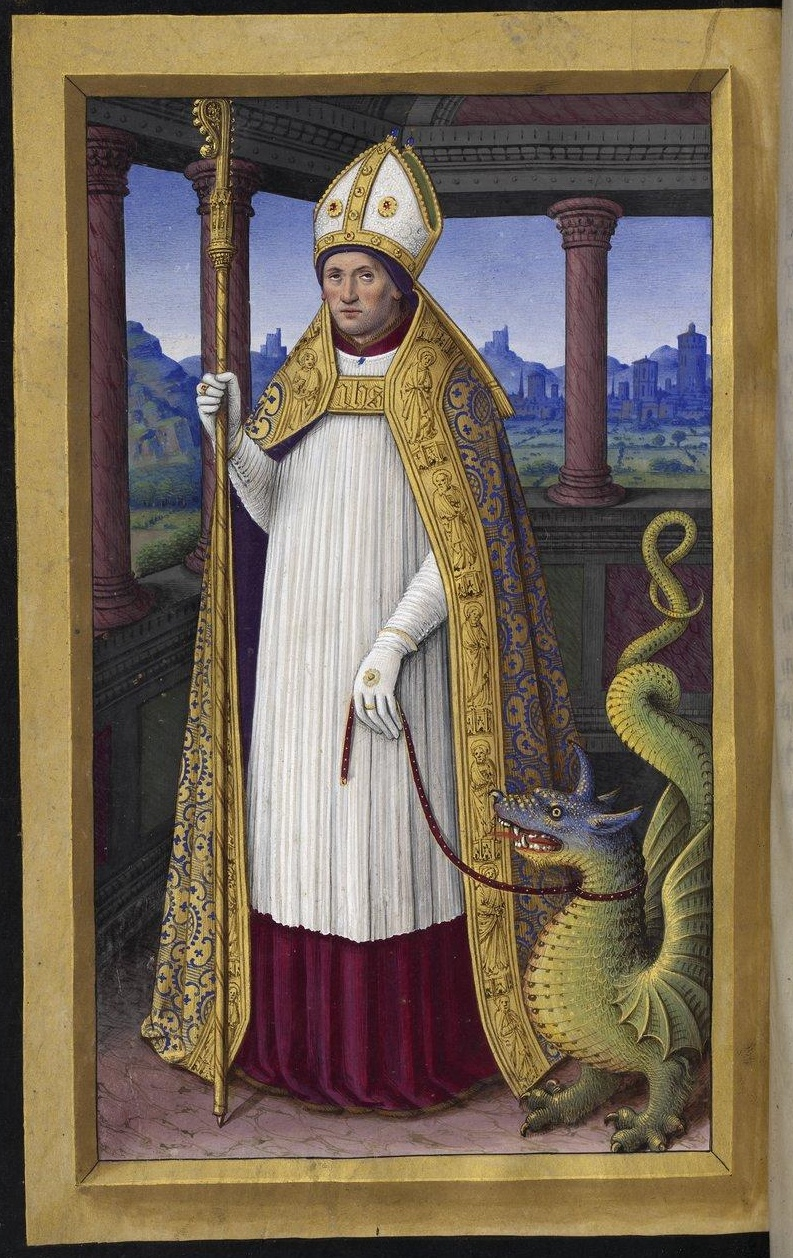
- Saint Lifard by Jean Bourdichon (1503-1508)
- Hometown: Orléans
- Died: 6th century Meung-sur-Loire
- Canonized: Pre-congregation
- Feast: 3 June
- Attributes: Hermit fighting a dragon with a stick

Saint Liphardus (or Lifard, Lifardo, Lifardus, Lifart, Lifhard, Lifhart, Liphard, Liphart, Lyphard) was a 6th-century lawyer, hermit and abbot in Meung-sur-Loire near Orléans, France. His feast day is 3 June.

== Guyon's Life ==
Symphorien Guyon (died 1657) in his Histoire de l'Eglise et diocèse, ville, et université d'Orléans tells that Liphard was born in Orléans, the son of Rigomert, prince of the city of Le Mans, and a close relative of King Clovis I. His younger brother was Saint Leonard. Liphard studied literature and the law as a young man, and because of his capability and his noble birth he was appointed a governor and judge in Orléans. However, around the age of 40 he became tired of the worldly life, left his job and was ordained a deacon. Soon after he entered the monastery of Saint Mesmin, while his brother Leonard went to Aquitaine. Liphard, accompanied by a disciple named Urbice, then withdrew to a place named Meun [Meung-sur-Loire], four leagues from Orléans, where there was an old chateau that had been ruined by the Huns and Vandals during the wars with Attila. In this solitary place Liphard built a small cell, where he lived an austere life of contemplation. The bishop of Orléans heard of Liphard's virtue and perfection, and made him a priest so he could teach others. Liphard continued his studies in his lonely cell.

Nearby there was a furious serpent or dragon that terrified all the people of the neighborhood, crawling or rolling near the fountain where they used to draw water. Only Liphard and his disciple Urbice dared go near the fountain. One day Liphard saw in a vision that the dragon was coming towards his cell to do harm. Liphard sent Urbice to the place where he knew he would meet the dragon. Urbice went there, unsuspecting, but when he saw the dragon coming towards him he fled back to Liphard in panic. Liphard smiled, blamed him for having too little faith, gave him a rod and told him to plant it before the furious beast. Urbice did as he was told, while Liphard prayed to God to kill the dragon. When the dragon saw the rod he tried to break it and shake it to pieces, but instead hung himself from the rod and died. A legion of devils who were living in the dragon came out howling and crying that they had been driven from their home. The peasants of the neighborhood heard the clamour and were afraid that the dragon had hurt Liphard, but when the arrived they found him making his ordinary prayers while the dragon lay dead beside him. (Note: Another version of the legend says that Liphard plunged his stick into the front of the dragon. His attribute is therefore an impaled dragon, cut in two.)

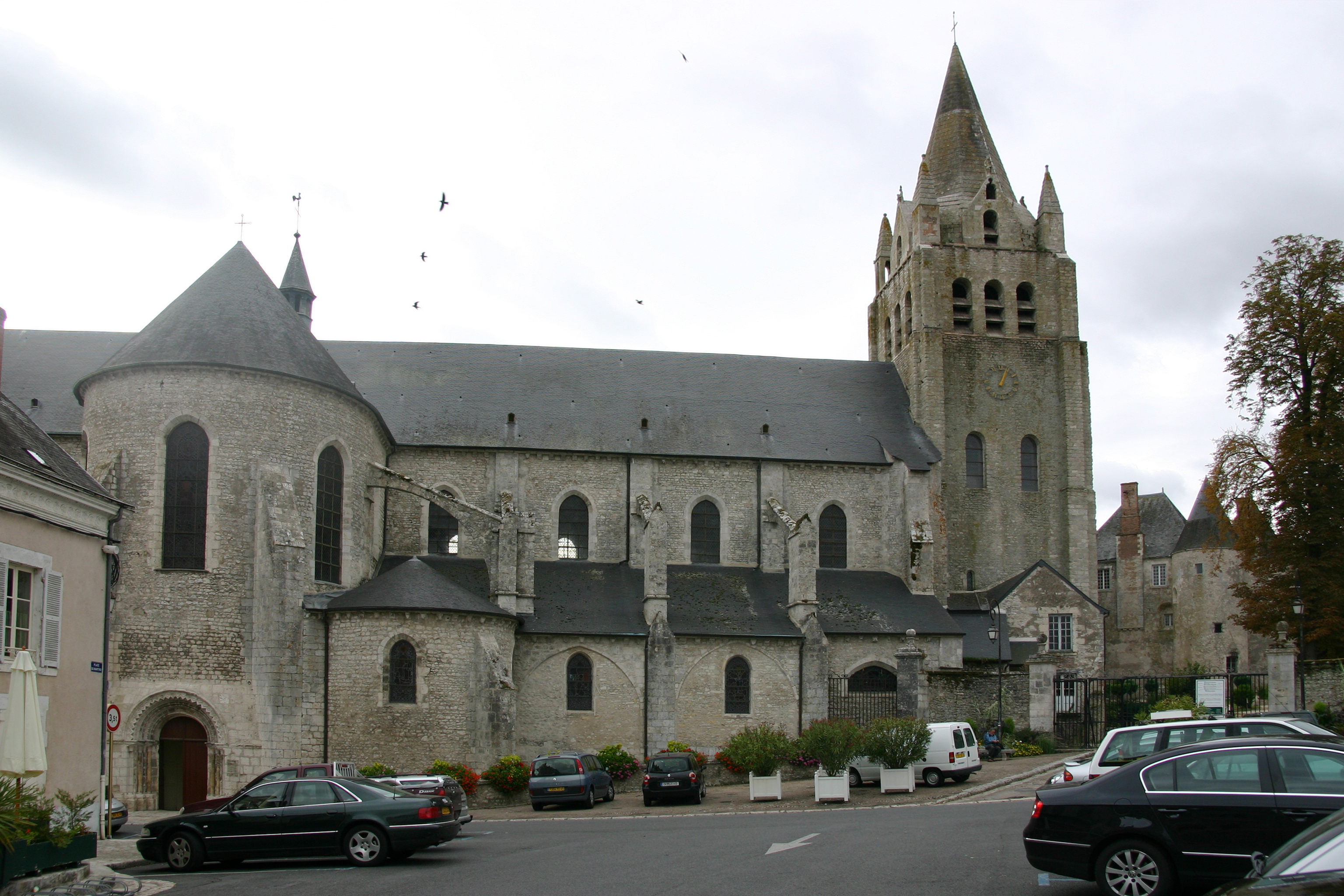
Collégiale Saint-Liphard de Meung-sur-Loire, which holds Liphard's tomb

Later, with his disciple Saint Urbice, Liphard founded the monastery of Meung-sur-Loire, of which he became abbot. After his death Urbice succeeded him as abbot.

== Monks of Ramsgate account ==
The Monks of Ramsgate wrote in their Book of Saints (1921),

LIPHARDUS (St.) (June 3)
(6th cent.) A citizen of Orleans who, having occupied various municipal positions of distinction, at the age of fifty embraced the Ecclesiastical state. When a deacon he retired to a solitary spot near the city and gave himself up to a life of prayer and penance. Later, when he had been ordained priest, a number of disciples gathered round him, and he became founder and first Abbot of a celebrated monastery. He died in the last half of the sixth century, but the exact year is not known.

== Butler's account ==
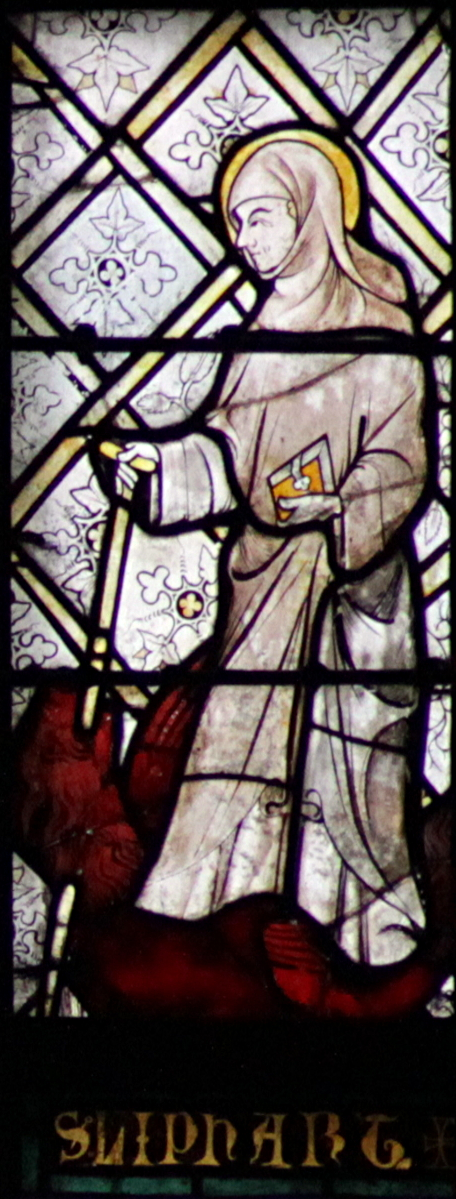
Saint Liphard and the Impaled Dragon. Chartres, Stained glass window of Saint Apollinaire

The hagiographer Alban Butler (1710–1773) wrote in his Lives of the Fathers, Martyrs, and Other Principal Saints under June 3,

St. Lifard, Abbot, near Orleans. His illustrious birth, the progress he had made in the study of the laws, and his extraordinary probity and piety qualified him for one of the first dignities in the magistrature of Orleans. The constant attendance he gave to all the duties of his charge was no hinderance to his devotions, either public, in assisting at all parts of the divine office, or private, in his closet; especially to his assiduity and fervour in frequenting the sacraments. To be more at liberty, and to disengage himself from the distractions of the world, in the fortieth year of his age he resigned his charge, and initiated himself in an ecclesiastical state: nor was it long before the bishop of Orleans ordained him deacon.

We may easily imagine with what piety and devotion he acquitted himself of all the sacred duties of his state. So perfectly was he penetrated with respect and awe of the majesty and presence of God, and with love of his goodness, when he assisted at the celebration, that he appeared like an angel about the altar. The spirit of love and penance and holy contemplation daily growing stronger in his heart, he resolved to withdraw himself entirely from the world, and bury himself in close solitude. The place he chose for this purpose was near the river Maulve, not far from the mountain and castle of Mehun or Meung, situated on the Loire, a little below Orleans. (Note: Mehun in Orleanois is by mistake confounded by several with Mehun in Berri, four leagues from Bourges, where was a royal castle now falling to ruin, in which Charles VII., who had recovered France from the English, suffered himself to die of hunger for fear of being poisoned, in 1461, not Charles V. as Dom Vaissette mistakes.) Urbicius, his disciple, bore him company, and they built themselves an hermitage of twigs and rushes.

The life which the saint here led was admirable. A little bread and water was all the subsistence he allowed himself, in sickness as well as in health, and his only garment was made of sackcloth. He often passed whole nights in prayer, and in all his employments his mind was so taken up on God as if he had lived without a body. Mark, bishop of Orleans, then lived at Cleri, two leagues below the city, famous for the collegiate church of the Blessed Virgin, still much resorted to by pilgrims to implore her intercession. (Note: The marble tomb of Lewis XI. who chose to be buried there out of devotion to the B. Virgin, is still shown there, though the Huguenots plundered it, and burnt his bones.) This prelate was an eye-witness to the great virtues of St. Lifard, whose hermitage was very near his residence, ordained him priest, and allowed him to found a monastery on the spot where his hermitage stood. This happened before the fourth council of Orleans, in which bishop Mark subscribed in 541. St. Lifard soon assembled a numerous community, and was to it a bright model of Christian perfection. An extraordinary gift of miracles drew on him the admiration of men.

The year in which he died is not known; but it was some time after the middle of the sixth century. His body was buried at Mehun; and over his tomb was built, first a chapel, afterwards a famous collegiate church, which is to this day enriched with his relics, and bears his name. A church in the city of Orleans, and several others in the diocess, are dedicated to God under his invocation. His name occurs in the Roman Martyrology. See his life in Surius and Mabillon, sæc. 1; Ben. also Saussaye, Annal. T. 3.

== Sources ==
- Butler, Alban (1799), The Lives of the Primitive Fathers, Martyrs, and Other Principal Saints, vol. VI, Edinburgh: J. Moir This article incorporates text from this source, which is in the public domain.
- Église Saint-Liphard à Hiesse (PDF) (in French), Office de tourisme du Confolentais
- Guyon, Symphorien (1647), Histoire de l'Église, diocèse, ville et université d'Orléans (in French), Paris
- St. Augustine's Abbey, Ramsgate (1921). The Book of saints : a dictionary of servants of God canonized by the Catholic Church. London: A. & C. Black, ltd. OCLC 671676136. This article incorporates text from this source, which is in the public domain.
