= Saint-Lyé-la-Forêt =

- Commune
- Coat of arms
- Location of Saint-Lyé-la-Forêt
- Location within France Location within Centre-Val de Loire
- Coordinates: 48°02′27″N 1°58′58″E
- Country: France
- Region: Centre-Val de Loire
- Department: Loiret
- Arrondissement: Orléans
- Canton: Pithiviers
- Intercommunality: La Forêt

Government
  - Mayor (2020–2026): Jacques Christian Van Belle
- Area^{1}: 27.22 km^{2} (10.51 sq mi)
- Elevation: 127 m (417 ft)
- Highest elevation: 137 m (449 ft)
- Lowest elevation: 120 m (390 ft)
- Population (2023): 1,257
  - Density: 46.18/km^{2} (119.6/sq mi)
- Time zone: UTC+01:00 (CET)
  - Summer (DST): UTC+02:00 (CEST)
- INSEE/Postal code: 45289 /45170
- ^{1} French Land Register data, which excludes lakes, ponds, glaciers > 1 km^{2} (0.386 sq mi or 247 acres) and river estuaries.

Saint-Lyé-la-Forêt (French pronunciation: [sɛ̃ lje la fɔʁɛ]) is a commune in the Loiret department in north-central France.

== History ==
Saint-Lyé-la-Forêt takes it name from Saint Lyé, a hermit who had retired to the forest seeking solitude. It was there that he began to work miracles: he healed the sick of their infirmities, especially children. He died in 534.

A chapel was erected on his tomb on the site of the current church. Later, his relics were transported to Pithiviers, but burned by the Huguenots in 1580. The remains preserved by Christians from Pithiviers were brought back to the village in 1664 after many adventures. They rest in a reliquary placed at the foot of the altar dedicated to him in the village Church of Saint Roch.

The village is near the site of an ancient road from Orléans to Paris. In 1918, Saint-Lyé became Saint-Lyé la Forêt.

== Chateau de la Mothe ==
It is reported that during the Crusades, Simon de Bombelle having saved Saint-Louis by covering him with his shield, the king gave him, on his return to France, around 1273, the barony of Mothe-Saint-Lyé which remained in this family. for three centuries.

The earliest part of the chateau dates back to the 16th century. The building, with a central staircase, sits at the end of a main courtyard surrounded by a moat bordering the castle. The Mansard roof is flanked by two turrets. The facades and roofs of the castle, courtyard and moat are registered as historical.

== See also ==
- Communes of the Loiret department
