= Duralex =

French glassware manufacturer

Duralex International
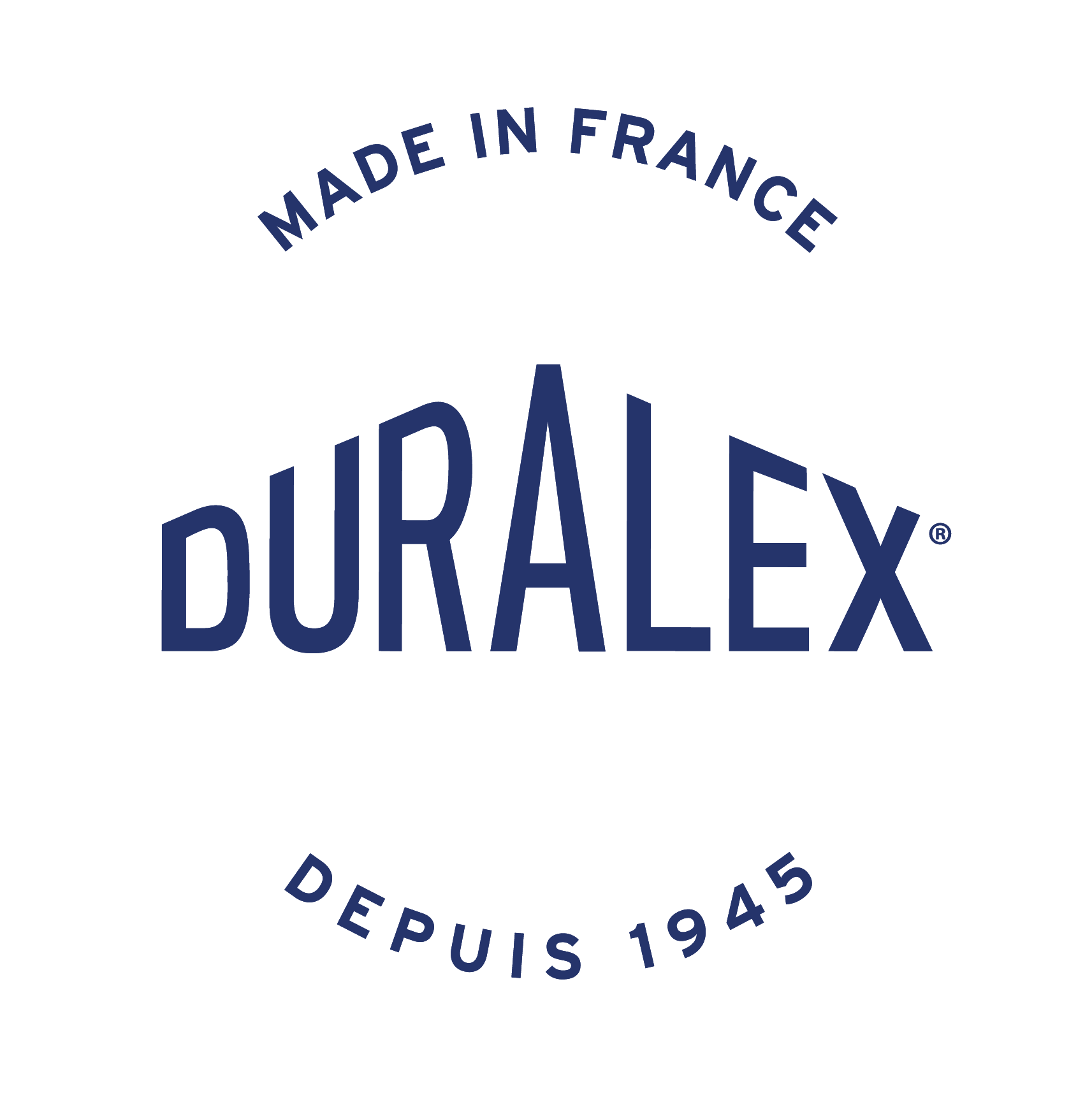
- Type: Private
- Industry: Glass
- Founded: 1945; 81 years ago
- Headquarters: La Chapelle-Saint-Mesmin, France
- Key people: Cédric Meston
- Products: Tempered glass tableware and kitchenware
- Revenue: €30.097M (2013)
- Owner: Tomé (since 2026)
- Number of employees: 220 (2013)
- Website: www.duralex.com

Duralex is a French tempered glass tableware and kitchenware manufacturer located in La Chapelle-Saint-Mesmin in Loiret, France. Using a technique developed in the 1930s by Saint-Gobain, moulded glass is heated to 600 degrees Celsius then cooled very quickly, giving it twice the impact resistance of normal glass.

The Picardie tumbler and the Gigogne glass are two of the company's best-known products. The "Gigogne" glass is in the permanent collection of the Musée des Arts Décoratifs in Paris.

The brand name is derived from the Latin motto dura lex, sed lex ("the law is harsh, but it is the law").

== History ==
=== Acquisition ===
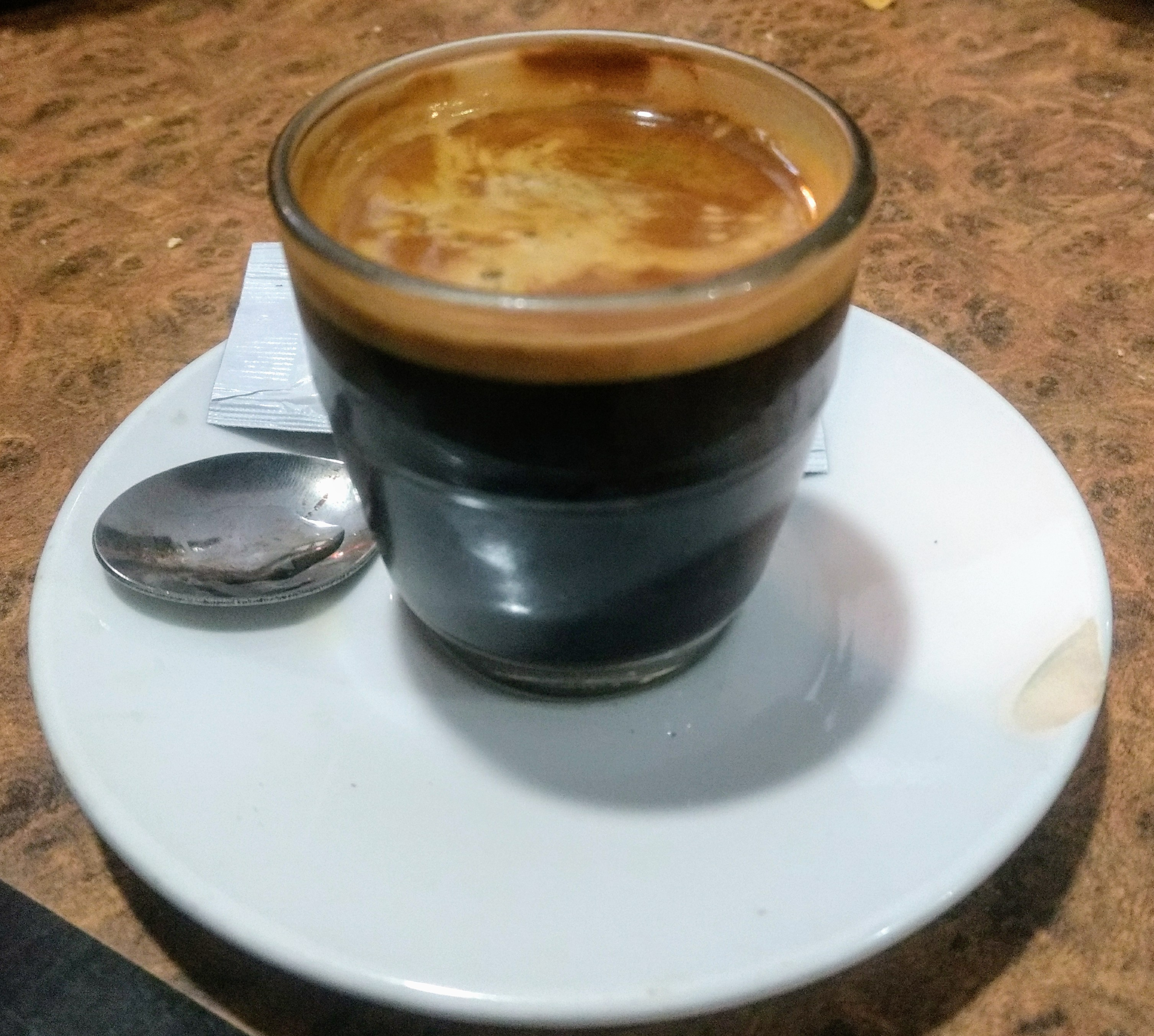
Gigogne glass

In January 2021, Duralex was acquired by International Cookware group, the owner (outside the USA) of the rival PYREX brand, for 3.5 million euros ($4.2m). International Cookware promised to maintain the majority of jobs, create a turnaround plan through investment of several tens of millions of euros (including modernization of the antiquated Orléans plant) and create commercial synergies with Pyrex, especially in sales and purchasing. The company's expertise in high strength tempered glass was of interest to the American brand, even though its production facilities were outdated. The company's vintage image, with its two best-sellers, the Gigogne and the Picardie, more than half a century after their creation, is also an obstacle to change, as Duralex's reputation does not extend beyond these two models: the company is working towards a more modern image.

In 2022, the International Cookware group changed its name to La Maison française du verre.

=== Energy crisis ===
In November 2022, following the rise in energy prices, the company was forced to cease operations and put its furnaces on standby. The 250 employees were placed on short-time working.

=== Energy costs and transition to cooperative ===
The furnaces were restarted on April 17, 2023, five months later. During this period, the company benefited from 15 million euros in state aid to cope with the crisis.

Duralex was placed into receivership in April 2024 for the fourth time in 20 years, which created a six month observation period during which a buyer for the company would be sought. In July, the Commercial Court of Orléans accepted a proposal supported by 60% of employees to transition the company to cooperative ownership, with all jobs to be retained.

=== 2025 public fundraising and 2026 takeover ===
The cooperative was in financial difficulty again in 2025, largely because of energy costs: glass-making uses a great deal of energy. In November 2025 it launched a public fundraising campaign on the crowdfunding platform Lita to modernise the plant, offering securities paying 8% a year and locked in for seven years. Pledges quickly exceeded €19 million against a €5 million target; the campaign closed at about €7 million, contributed by 10,523 individual investors.

Seven months later, on 1 June 2026, the Orléans commercial court placed Duralex in receivership again. On 14 October 2026 the court chose the offer of Tomé, the holding company of entrepreneur Cédric Meston, over a rival bid from the Carlesimo group. Tomé took over the factory, the brand and the stock, keeping 155 of the 219 jobs, with a €16 million financing plan that includes €6 million of public aid from the state, the region and Orléans Métropole.

The debts remained with the cooperative, which faced liquidation, and the day after the ruling Lita said the €7 million raised from individuals would not be repaid. In a letter to the investors, Meston said he could not promise any repayment and offered them Duralex and Tupperware products in proportion to their investment, as well as a visit to the factory.

== Awards and cultural references ==
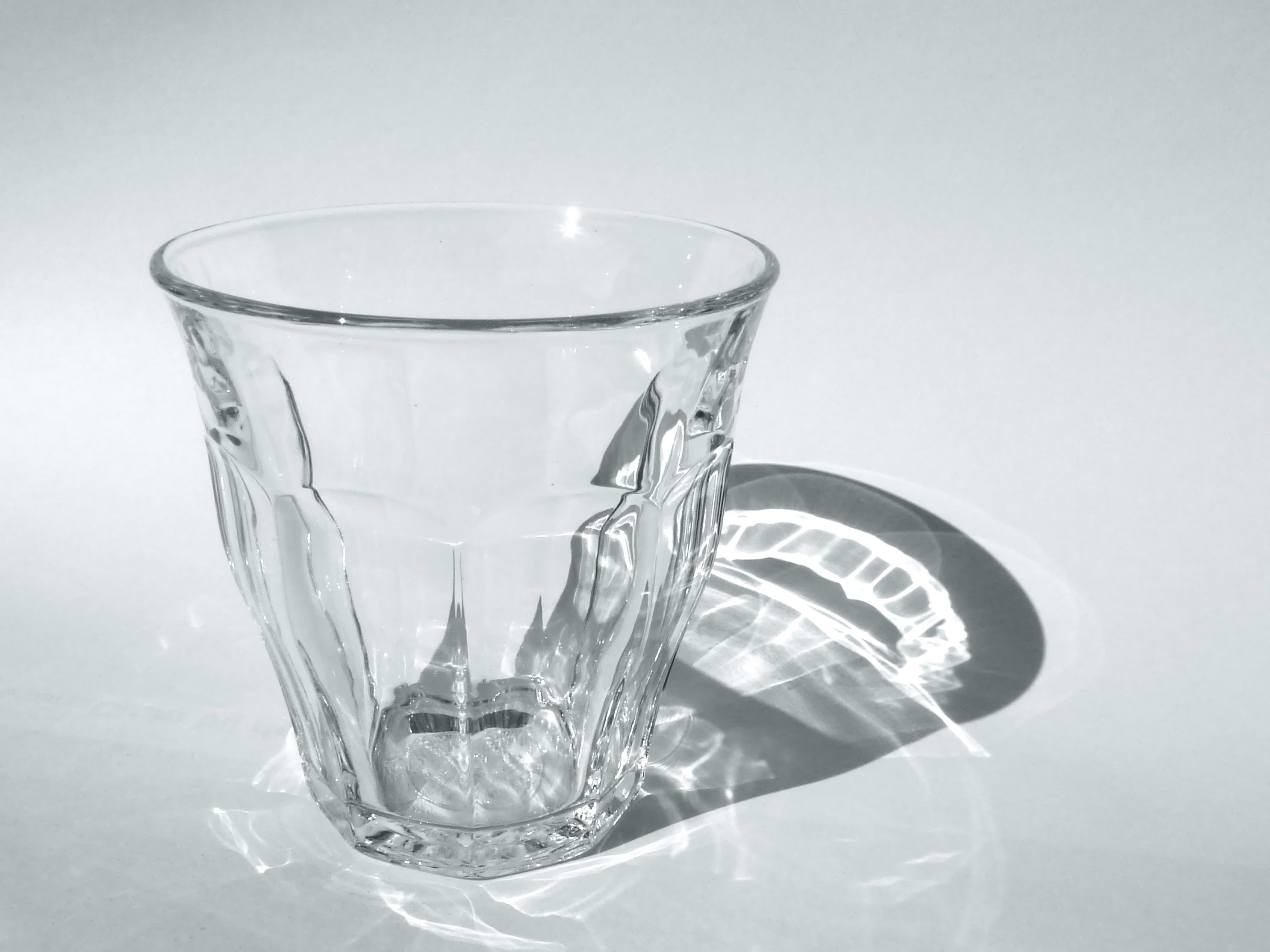
Picardie glass

The magazine This Old House named Duralex's OvenChef glass baking dishes one of the best new home products of 2014, citing the dishes' ability to withstand wide temperature swings without shattering.

In the 1981 film, Raiders of the Lost Ark, Harrison Ford drinks from a Duralex whisky glass. In this scene filmed at the Marhala bar in Cairo, he sits next to a small monkey named Capuchin.

The Duralex glass also appears in three James Bond films: in 1995 in GoldenEye, in 2008 in Quantum of Solace, and in 2012 in Skyfall. The glass appears the scene in which James Bond, played by Daniel Craig, drinks whisky with a white scorpion on his hand, before trapping the creature in the glass by turning it upside down on the bar counter.

The Gigogne model features in the collections of the Musée des Arts Décoratifs in Paris and made an appearance at the MoMA Store, the shop of the Museum of Modern Art in New York.
