= Micy Abbey =

Abbey in Loiret, France

Coordinates: 47°52′55″N 1°52′06″E

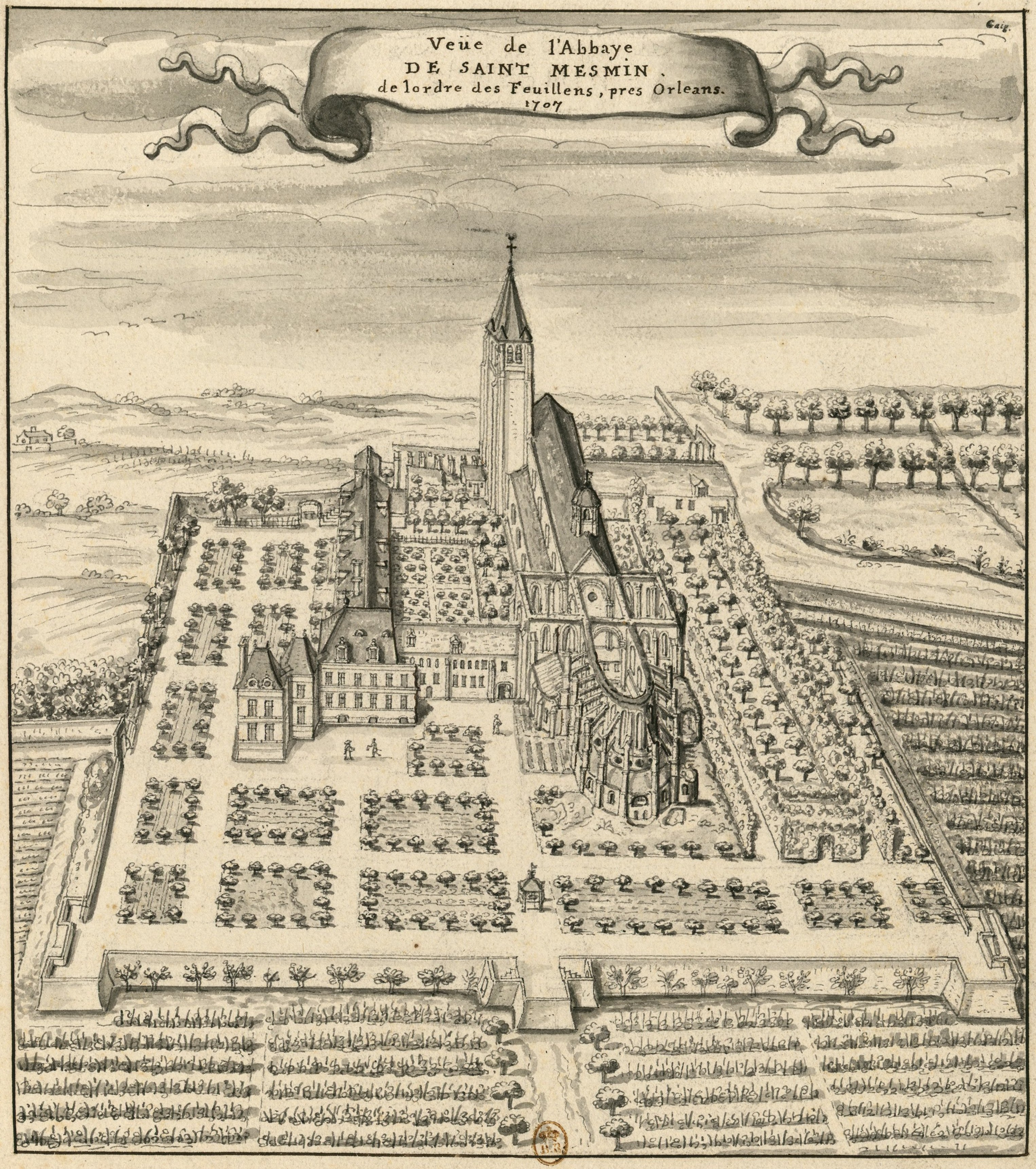
Micy Abbey: drawing by Louis Boudan, 1707

Micy Abbey or the Abbey of Saint-Mesmin, Micy (French: Abbaye Saint-Mesmin de Micy), sometimes referred to as Micy, was a Benedictine abbey near Orléans at the confluence of the Loire and the Loiret, located on the territory of the present commune of Saint-Pryvé-Saint-Mesmin. Since 1939 it has hosted a community of Carmelites.

== History ==
=== Early period ===
The 9th century Life of Saint Maximin records that Euspicius, the archpriest of Verdun, went to meet Clovis I, who had come to punish the city for its revolt. After Euspicius obtained the royal pardon, the king attached himself to both him and his nephew Mesmin. While seeking a retreat in 508, Euspicius discovered an unoccupied royal villa named Micy near Orleans, situated at the confluence of the Loire and Loiret rivers. He received the domain of Micy from Clovis in order to establish a monastery there. The king added other domains and a piece of land inside the walls of Orléans, called Alleu de Saint-Mesmin, to serve as a refuge in case of troubles. The donation diplomas attributed to Clovis are forgeries.

The monastery was built by the monks inside an enclosure, including cells of cenobites and two large buildings. The church was dedicated to Saint Stephen. Nothing remains of these buildings.

Euspicius died on June 10, 510 and was buried in Orléans next to Saint Aignan in the church of Saint-Pierre-aux-Bœufs, which became the basilica of Saint Aignan. Mesmin then took over the direction of the monastery. Mesmin the Elder died on December 15, 520 and was buried in the current cave of the dragon of Béraire (located at La Chapelle-Saint-Mesmin), a natural cavity, on the opposite bank, where he liked to come to collect himself.

Mesmin the Younger was the fifth abbot. He died around 593. Dagobert I and Thierry III each made donations to the abbey. During the reign of the latter, around 675, the bodies of Mesmin the Elder, Theodemir and Mesmin the Younger were transported to an oratory inside Orléans.

The monks of Micy contributed much to the civilization of the Orléans region; they cleared and drained the lands and taught the semi-barbarous inhabitants the worth and dignity of agricultural work. From Micy Abbey, monastic life spread within and around the diocese of Orleans. Among the monks who lived in the monastery and who are registered in its menologe since the beginning of the establishment, Jean Mabillon noted twenty-six of them recognized as saints by the Church. Besides Euspicius and Mesmin, the first and second abbots, there were:

- Liphardus and Urbicius who founded the Abbey of Meung-sur-Loire;
- Lyé who became a hermit in the forest of Orléans; likewise Viatre, who sought solitude in Sologne; and Doulchard who retired to the forest of Ambly near Bourges.
- Leonard of Noblac introduced the monastic life into the territory of Limoges; Almir, Ulphacius and Saint Bomer († c.560) in the vicinity of Montmirail.
- Avitus († about 527) was active in the district of Chartres; Leonard of Vendœuvre († c.570) in the valley of the Sarthe;
- Fraimbault de Lassay and Constantine set up hermitages in the Javron forest; Leonard of Dunois, Alva and Ernier in Perche.
- Calais († 541) founded the monastery of Aniole; Laumer († c.590) became Abbot of Corbion.
- Leobinus became Bishop of Chartres.
- Theodemir, Senard, Amatre, and Pavas were recognized as holy monks.

Agilus, Viscount of Orléans, was a protector of Micy.

=== Carolingian era ===
In the early days, the rule followed was that of the Eastern hermits observed by the followers of St. Anthony and St. Basil. These rules had been brought to the West by John Cassian and Martin of Tours.

In 788, Charlemagne appointed the Bishop of Orléans, Theodulf, as abbot of Fleury-Saint-Benoît, abbot of Micy, abbot of Saint-Aignan of Orleans and of Saint-Liphard of Meung-sur-Loire. Sacked and abandoned during the wars of the eighth century, Micy was refounded by Théodulf, who was not a regular abbot of Micy but a beneficiary abbot. Noting the state of the abbey, he undertook to improve it by introducing the Benedictine rule. To introduce the rule, he asked Benedict of Aniane for monks to teach it. Twelve monks under the leadership of a superior, were sent to the abbey of Micy.

=== Later period ===
François III de La Rochefoucauld, Bishop of Clermont, received the abbey of Micy in 1598. He undertook to complete the restoration of the buildings in 1606. The Benedictine monks of the abbey were criticized for their conduct. So the abbot decided to expel them from the abbey and to put in their place monks from the congregation of reformed Cistercians, called Feuillants. This congregation had been created in 1583 at the Feuillants monastery in Toulouse. He obtained the approval of Pope Paul V after being in Rome in 1607 when he was appointed cardinal. The pope sent a brief to this effect to the bishop of Orleans, Gabriel de L'Aubespine, on October 12, 1607. After a period of contestation by the Benedictine monks of the abbey who were ordered to leave, the Feuillants were solemnly installed on December 10, 1608. The abbey was suppressed during the French Revolution and the buildings demolished. The last abbot of Micy, Chapt de Rastignac, was one of the victims of the "September Massacres", at Paris, 1792, in the prison of L'Abbaye.

== Carmel of Orléans ==
In 1939, the Carmel of Orléans, founded in 1617, was transferred to 18, rue Claude Joliot, on the former site of the abbey of Micy.

== The cross of Micy ==
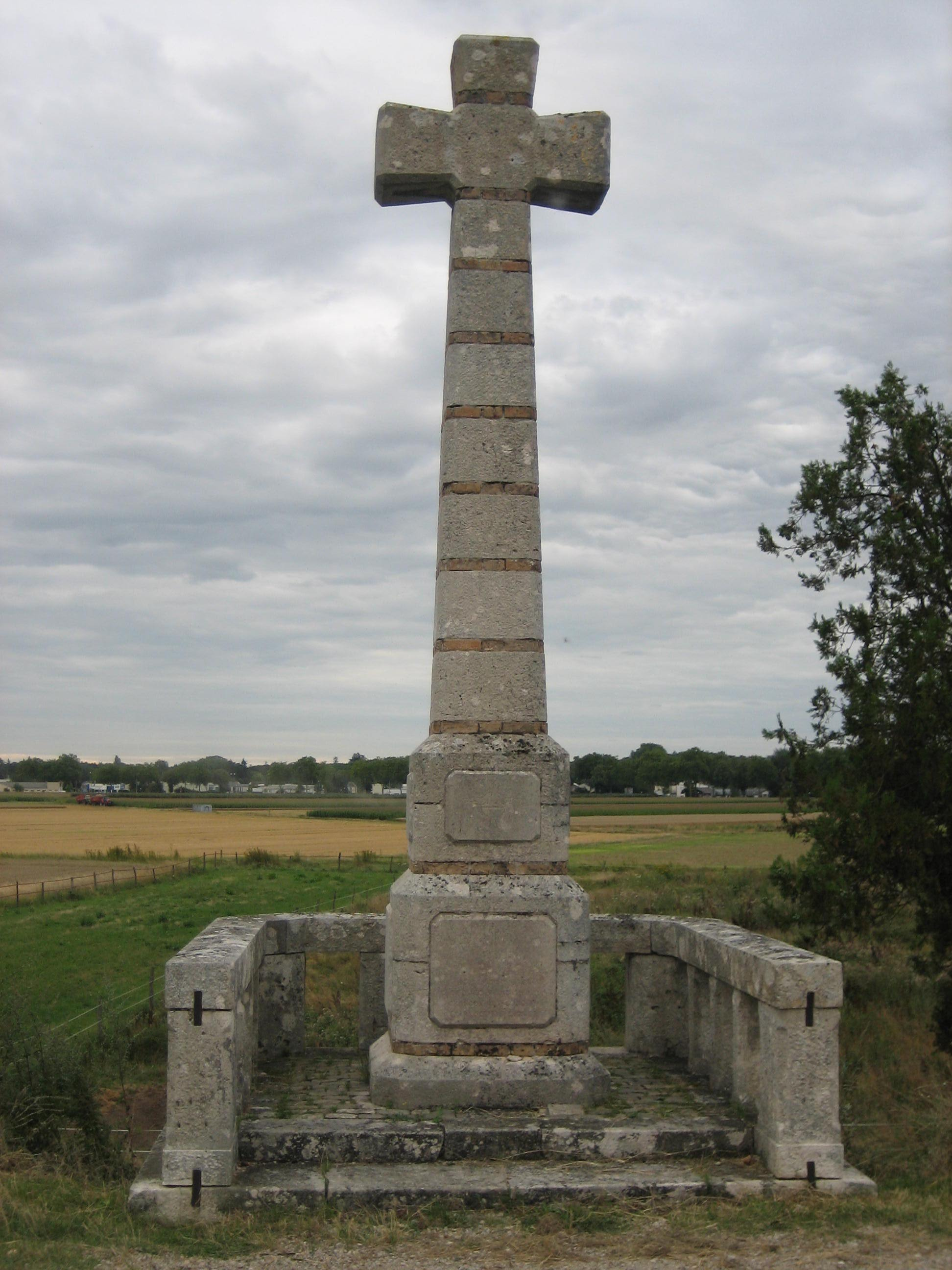
Croix de Micy

In Saint-Pryvé-Saint-Mesmin, the cross of Micy remains, a cross 10 meters high from the base to the top, which was built in 1858 with the last stones of the remains of the abbey. It is located in the very enclosure of the outbuildings of the former monastery.

Its plans were drawn and the work directed by Alexandre Collin, the engineer who was responsible for the rehabilitation of the Dragon cave of Béraire.

The base of the cross bears the following inscription: "I stand on the ruins of the monastery of Micy founded under Clovis I, Christian, king of the Franks. In the year of the Lord 1858, Pius IX being supreme pontiff, Napoleon III emperor. Félix Dupanloup, bishop of Orléans, dedicated this monument to the venerated memory of Saints Euspice and Mesmin, founders of the abbey of Micy."
