= Saint Lié =

Saint Lie
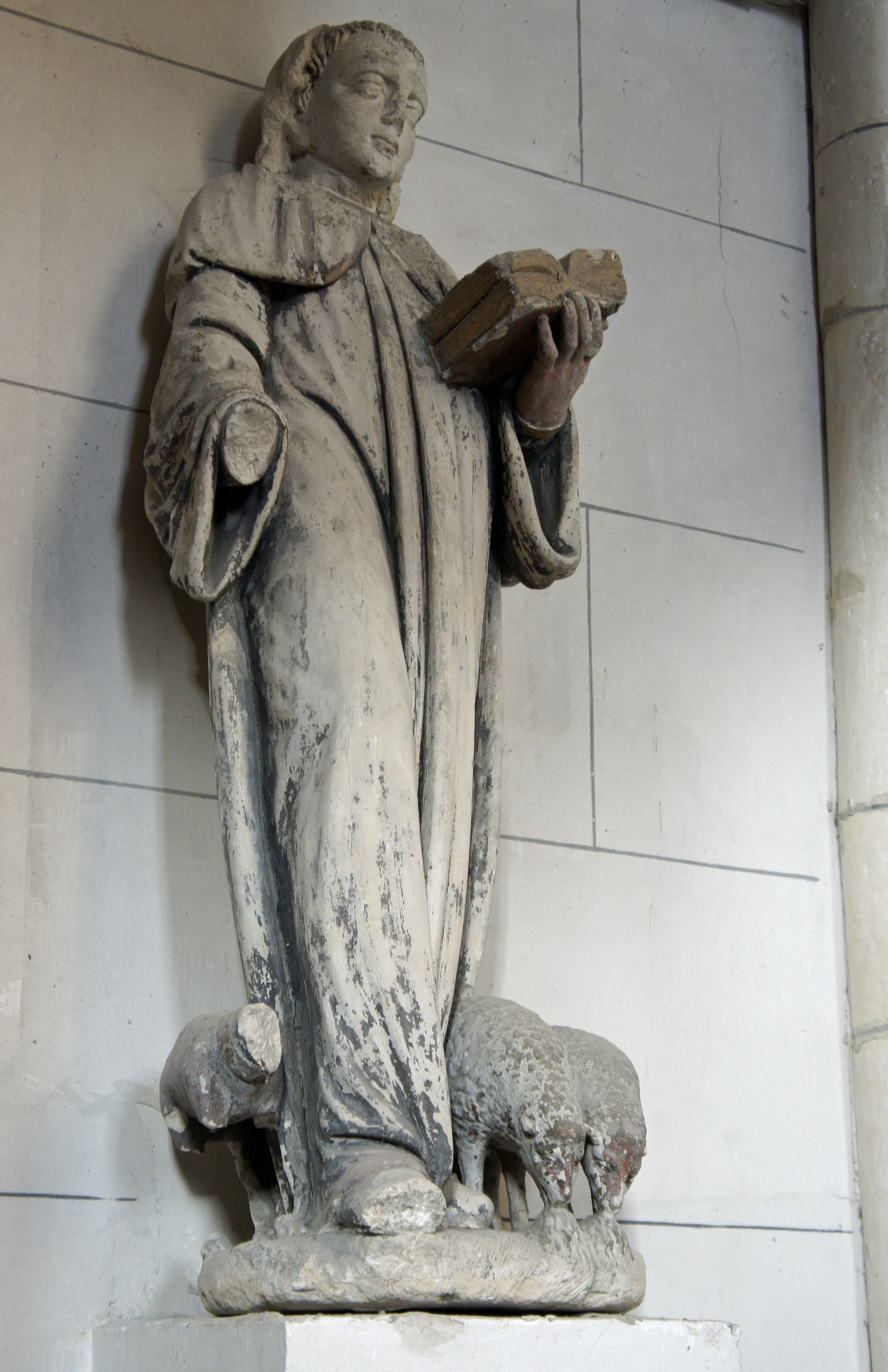
- Statue of Lié de Micy at Ville-Dommange
- Born: Berry, France
- Died: c. 534
- Venerated in: Roman Catholic Church Orthodox Church
- Canonized: pre-congregation
- Major shrine: Saint-Lié-la-Forêt
- Feast: November 5

Saint Lie (Lié, Lyé, Laetus, Lætus) (died 533) of Orléans is a French saint. He is honored in the bishopric of Orléans and his relics are enshrined in the village of Saint-Lyé-la-Forêt in that diocese. His feast day is November 5.

== Life ==
Born of a family in Berry, France sometime during the reign of Chlothar I, his name suggests a Gallo-Roman background. Small of stature, he was a peasant herd keeper, who is said to have embraced the monastic life at the age of 12. He spent some time at the monastery of Micy-Saint Mesmin, near Orléans, where he was welcomed by the abbot Treïcius, who ordained him a deacon. While at Micy, Lié provided direction to fellow monk Leonard of Noblac.

After a few years, he left in search of greater solitude. He headed north and stopped on the edge of the Loges forest (Forest of Orleans), not far from a clearing where poor loggers were cutting down oaks and barking them, hence the hamlet "Les Ecossoires"). There, having found a dense thicket where no sound entered, he built himself a hut and spent his days in prayer there, living only on wild fruits.

Lié only left this solitude to visit the sick, to comfort them with a few holy words, and to soften the bitterness of the last passage. The blind, the lame, the crippled came to meet him and more than once obtained healing from him. He lived there until the year 534, which he predicted would be the year of his entry into eternal beatitude. He was buried in the place where he had lived and, on his tomb, a chapel was erected.

Saint Lié was viewed an example for his humility.

== Veneration ==
His body was later brought by Ermentheus, bishop of Orleans to the church of Pithiviers. They were burnt by the Huguenots in 1580. However, there were still some fragments of his legs preserved by Christians of Pithiviers. In 1664, they were returned to the village of Saint-Lyé after many adventures. They rest in a reliquary placed at the foot of the altar dedicated to him. Many pilgrims would come every year on Pentecost Monday to venerate them and ask for the healing of their infirmities.

In 1523 a brotherhood dedicated to venerating the relics of Saint Lie was founded at Mohon, in the department of Ardennes. The brotherhood having obtained an indulgence from Pope Paul V, in 1611 the dedication of the local church was changed from that of Saint Gilles to Saint Lié. Some of his relics were transported to the Église Saint-Lié de Mohon, probably around 1683. There he is celebrated on January 2.

Saint Lyé is depicted on a pillar of the south porch of Chartres Cathedral.

=== Patronage ===
Saint Lié is considered a protector of the sick.

== Legacy ==
Saint-Lyé-la-Forêt is named for him, as is the Parish of Mont Saint Lié in the Archdiocese of Reims.

There is a church, Église Saint-Lyé de Saint-Lyé, dedicated to Saint Lié in Saint-Lyé, (Aube) that has a polychrome stone statue of the saint from the sixteenth century and a painting of the "Vision of St Lyé" by one of the Cossards (Pierre or Guillaume II).

The Église Saint-Lié de Ville-Dommange located in Ville-Dommange dates from the thirteenth century. Around 1442 it had a silver reliquary containing bone from the arm of the saint.
