= La Chapelle-Saint-Mesmin =

- Commune
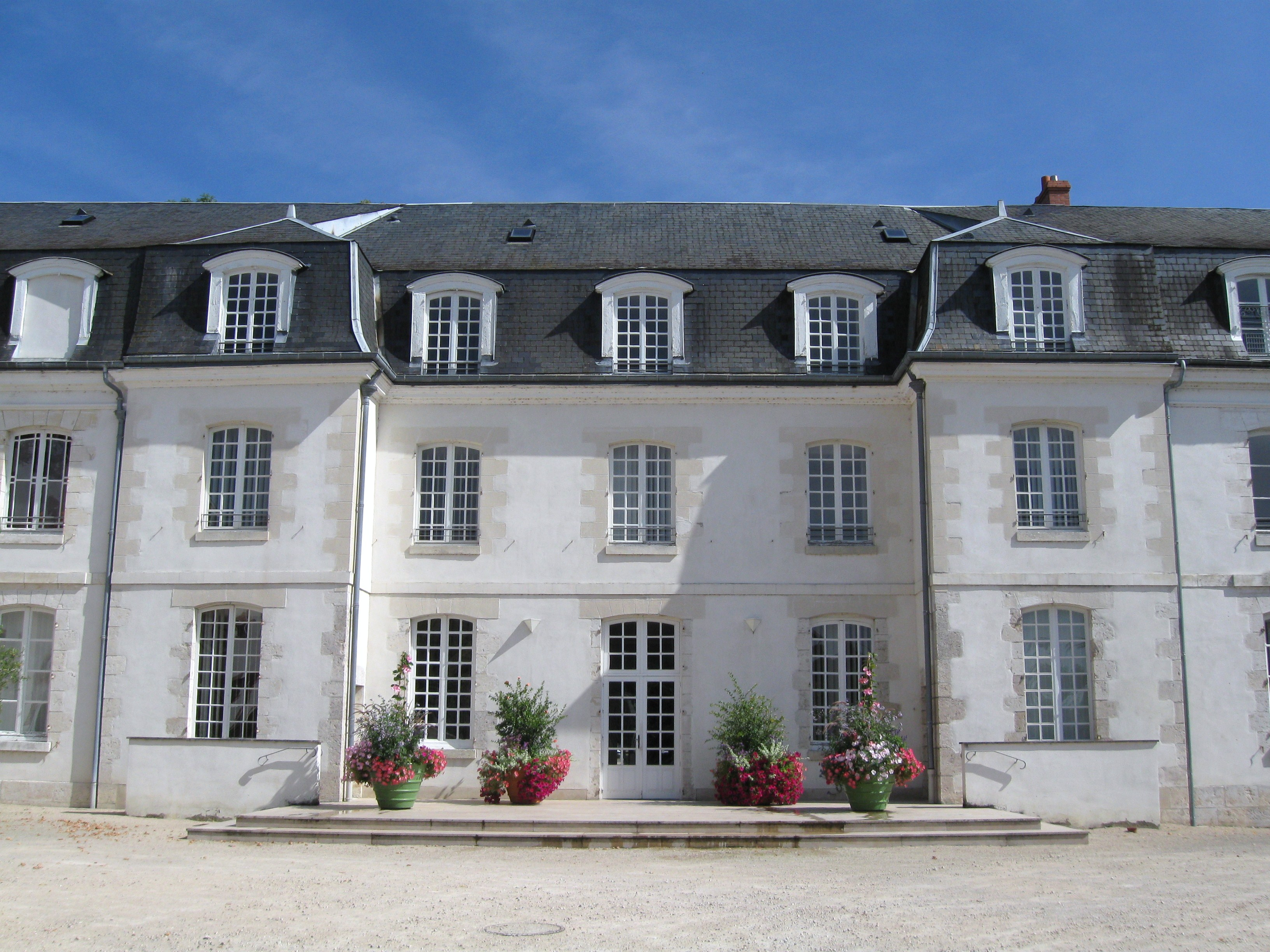
- The town hall in La Chapelle-Saint-Mesmin

- Flag Coat of arms
- Location of La Chapelle-Saint-Mesmin
- Location within France Location within Centre-Val de Loire
- Coordinates: 47°53′26″N 1°50′27″E
- Country: France
- Region: Centre-Val de Loire
- Department: Loiret
- Arrondissement: Orléans
- Canton: Saint-Jean-de-la-Ruelle
- Intercommunality: Orléans Métropole

Government
  - Mayor (2020–2026): Valérie Barthe Cheneau
- Area^{1}: 8.96 km^{2} (3.46 sq mi)
- Highest elevation: 113 m (371 ft)
- Lowest elevation: 87 m (285 ft)
- Population (2023): 11,017
  - Density: 1,230/km^{2} (3,180/sq mi)
- Demonym(s): Chapellois, Chapelloise (French)
- Time zone: UTC+01:00 (CET)
  - Summer (DST): UTC+02:00 (CEST)
- INSEE/Postal code: 45075 /45380
- Website: www.ville-lachapellesaintmesmin.fr
- ^{1} French Land Register data, which excludes lakes, ponds, glaciers > 1 km^{2} (0.386 sq mi or 247 acres) and river estuaries.

La Chapelle-Saint-Mesmin (French pronunciation: [la ʃapɛl sɛ̃ memɛ̃]) is a commune in the French department of Loiret, region of Centre-Val de Loire.

The village is located in the natural region of France of the Loire Valley and in the metropolis of Orléans. It is one of the 22 communes of Orléans Métropole. It notably hosts the glass production plant Duralex .

== Geography ==
La Chapelle-Saint-Mesmin borders the natural region of Beauce.

The village is located 5,5 km west from Orléans on the north shore of the Loire and 114,5 km south-south-west of Paris.

The municipal territory is divided into five large parallel bands oriented south-west north-east and defined by successively five large borders that shape the village : the A10 motorway which separates the village from Ingré, the Orléans-Blois railway, the departmental route 2152, the hillside of the Loire (which defines the valley to the southwest and overhanging the river to the southeast) and the Loire.

== History ==
According to the legend, around the 6th century Saint Mesmin established a monastery at Micy, on the opposite site of the Loire river, and fought a dragon at Béraire (first name of the village).

On his death in 520, Saint Mesmin was buried in the cave under the Villa Berarii (Béraire).

Around 550, a first funeral basilica church was erected above the tomb of Saint Mesmin on the initiative of the viscount of Orléans, Agylus (Saint Ay).

Around 675, the relics of Saint Mesmin were transferred to Orléans.

== Population ==
Historical population
Year	Pop.	±% p.a.
1968	5,143	—
1975	6,482	+3.36%
1982	7,801	+2.68%
1990	8,207	+0.64%
1999	8,967	+0.99%
2007	9,354	+0.53%
2012	9,937	+1.22%
2017	10,353	+0.82%
2023	11,017	+1.04%
Source: INSEE

== Twin towns – sister cities ==
La Chapelle-Saint-Mesmin is twinned with:

- Newhaven, East Sussex, United Kingdom

== See also ==
- Communes of the Loiret department
