= Susanna the Deaconess =

Christian martyr and saint

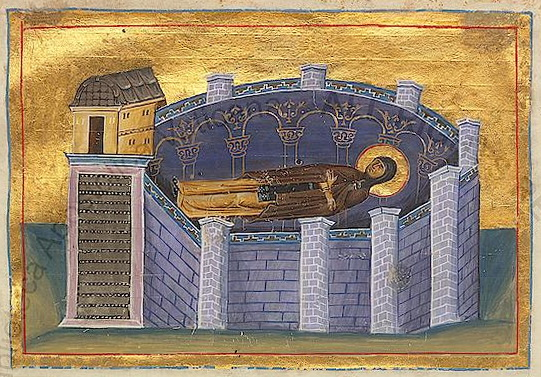
- Born: 3rd century
- Died: 300s Eleutheropolis
- Occupation: Nun, deaconess

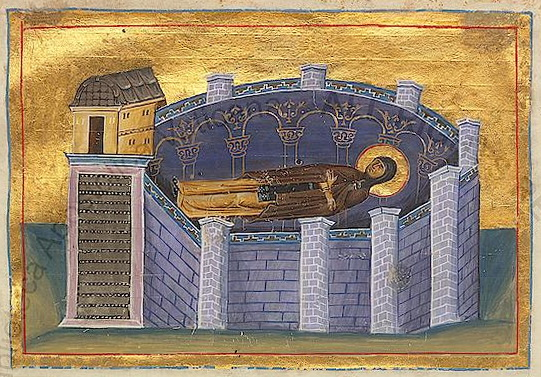

Susanna the Deaconess (Ancient Greek: Σωσάννα ἡ διακόνισσα) was a deaconess, saint and martyr who supposedly lived in Palestine in the 4th century. According to her hagiography, she chose to devote herself entirely to the Christian faith by dressing as a man and joining a male monastery under the name "John". There, she led a pious life until she was discovered following false accusations of rape within the monastery.

Susanna was later appointed as a deaconess by the bishop of Eleutheropolis. Finally, she suffered martyrdom under grim circumstances in the early 4th century in this city. She is commemorated on 15 December in the Eastern Orthodox Church.

== Biography ==
According to the hagiographical accounts about her, Susanna was born in Palestine during the reign of emperor Maximian (286–305). Her mother, Martha, is said to have been Hebrew, while her father was reportedly a Greek polytheistic priest named Artemios. She is said to have been pious from a young age and to have converted willingly, being catechized and then baptized by a priest named Silvanos.

After the death of her parents, she is said to have sold all her possessions, distributed her entire fortune to the poor, and decided to join a male monastery in Jerusalem. Disguising herself as a man, she cut her hair and adopted the name "John". There, she reportedly stood out for her piety and was eventually appointed archimandrite.

Her life in the monastery is said to have gone relatively smoothly for about twenty years after she joined. However, she was accused by a female visitor of attempting to rape her. The hagiographies assert her innocence, claiming that the truth was that the accuser had actually tried to seduce her and, failing to do so, resolved to accuse her of rape instead.

She is said to have accepted the accusations and even apologized. However, when the bishop of Eleutheropolis visited the monastery to assess the situation and conduct his own investigation, she revealed that she was a woman to two virgin nuns. The bishop, moved by her faith, decided to consecrate her as a deaconess and invited her to accompany him back to Eleutheropolis.

In that city, she was said to have later been martyred by a man named Alexander after refusing to "sacrifice to the idols". Susanna reportedly had her breasts cut off, which were then miraculously restored by God. She was subsequently forced to drink molten lead; but, when this also failed to kill her, she is said to finally have been beaten and then executed by being burned at the stake.

== Legacy ==
Anastasios Quaestor and/or Balbos, two famous Byzantine hymnographers of the 9th century, have composed several canons in her honor. Her memory is commemorated on 15 December in the Eastern Orthodox Church.
