= Euspicius =

Saint Euspicius

Abbot of Micy Abbey
- Died: June 10, 510; Saint-Pryvé-Saint-Mesmin, France
- Venerated in: Roman Catholic Church
- Canonized: pre-congregation

Euspicius was a Gallo-Roman archdeacon of Verdun who, around 508, founded Micy Abbey. A renowned teacher of the contemplative life, he served as Micy's first abbot. He is considered a saint by the Roman Catholic church.

== Life ==
During the siege of Verdun, Euspicius, who was the archpriest in the city, went to the camp of the Frankish king Clovis to request mercy for the Gallo-Roman insurgents. The king was so impressed that in 508 he gave Euspicius and his nephew Maximinus (also called Mesmin) the domain of Micy, near Orléans at the confluence of the Loire and the Loiret, in order to establish a monastery. Besides the royal villa on the property, the king added other domains and a piece of land inside the walls of Orléans, called Alleu de Saint-Mesmin, to serve as a refuge in case of troubles. The abbey church was dedicated to St. Stephen.

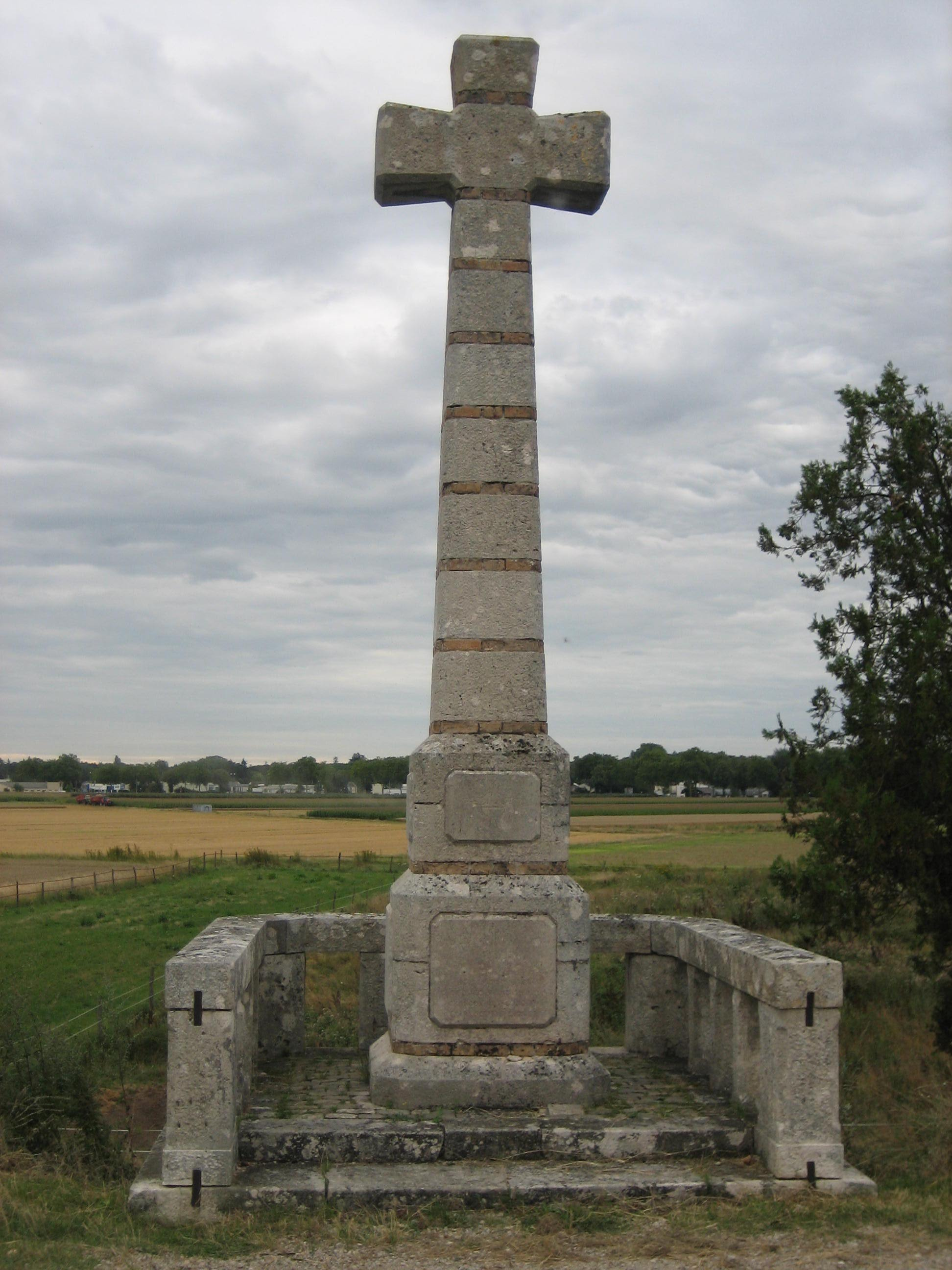
Croix de Micy, dedicated to Sts. Euspicius and Mesmin, Saint-Pryvé-Saint-Mesmin

Euspicius became its first abbot. Euspicius also became a renowned teacher of the contemplative life as well. The rule followed was that of the Eastern hermits observed by the followers of St. Anthony and St. Basil. These rules had been brought to the West by John Cassian and Martin of Tours.

The monks of Micy cleared and drained the surrounding lands and encouraged agricultural work in the local population. From Micy Abbey, monastic life spread within and around the diocese of Orleans.

Euspicius died on June 10, 510 and was buried in Orléans next to Saint Aignan in the church of Saint-Pierre-aux-Bœufs, which became the Church of Saint Aignan. Shortly after 1029, his remains were returned to the abbey, now known as Saint-Mesmin de Micy.

Upon his death, Euspicius was succeeded as abbot by his nephew, Mesmin.
