= Battle of Meung-sur-Loire =

Battle during the Hundred Years' War

Coordinates: 47.8294°N 1.6992°E

- Part of the Hundred Years' War
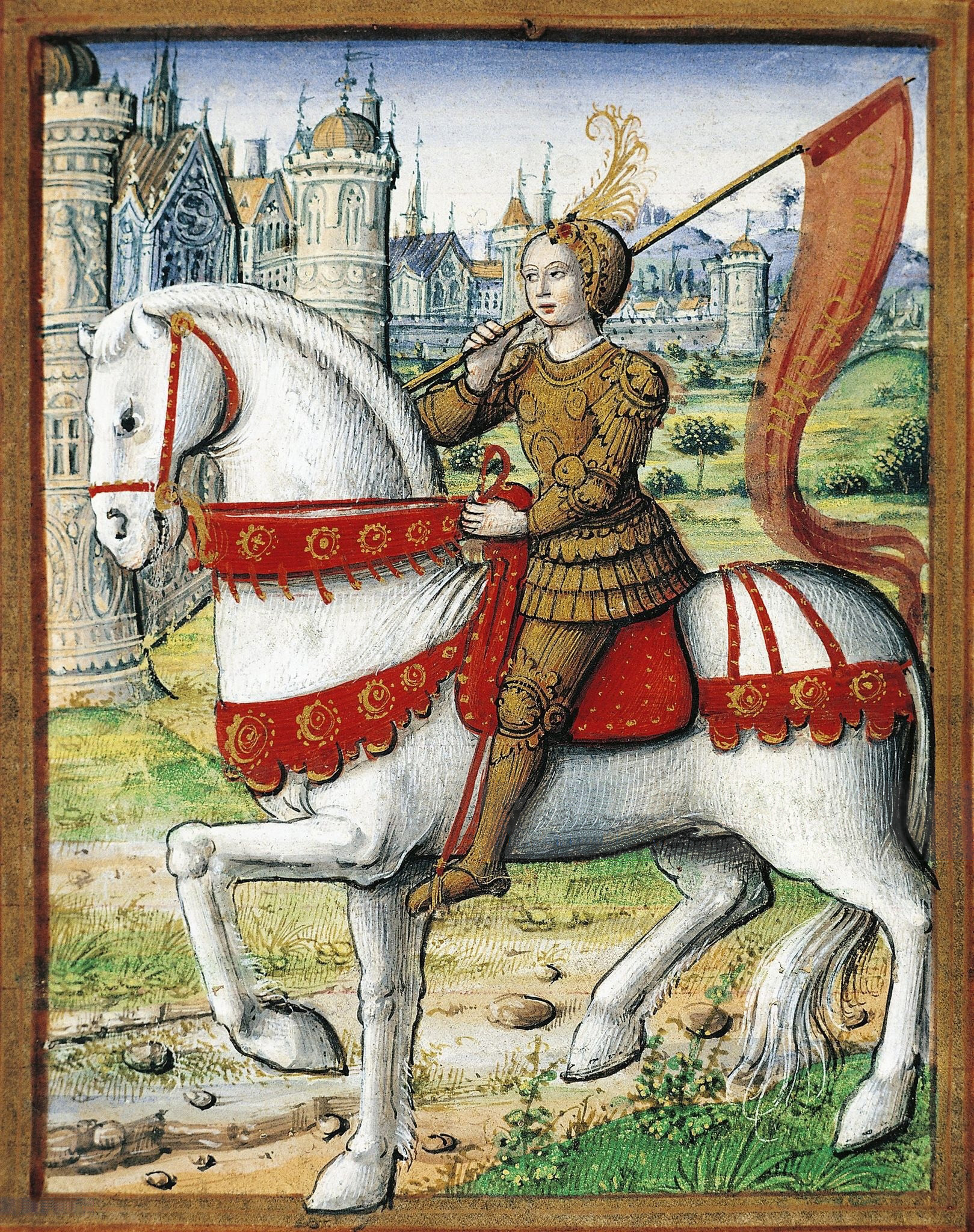
- Early sixteenth-century artist's impression of Joan of Arc on campaign.
Date	15 June 1429
Location	Meung-sur-Loire, France
Result	French victory

Belligerents
Kingdom of France	Kingdom of England

Commanders and leaders
Joan of Arc; John II of Alençon	John, Lord Talbot; Thomas, Lord Scales

Strength
6,000 – 7,000 (including non combatants)	Lower than the French

Casualties and losses
Light	Heavy

The Battle of Meung-sur-Loire took place on 15 June 1429. It was one of Joan of Arc's battles following relief of the siege at Orléans. This campaign was the second sustained French offensive in a generation in the Hundred Years' War.

== Background ==
Meung-sur-Loire (now in Loiret) was a small town on the northern bank of the Loire river in central France, slightly west of Orléans. It controlled a bridge of strategic significance during the latter part of the war. Captured by the English a few years earlier as a staging point for a planned invasion of southern France, the French offensive recaptured the bridge and hampered English movement south of the river during the campaign.

The French Loire Campaign of 1429 consisted of five actions:

1. The Siege of Orléans.
2. The Battle of Jargeau.
3. The Battle of Meung-sur-Loire.
4. The Battle of Beaugency.
5. The Battle of Patay.

Virtually all of France north of the Loire had fallen to foreign occupation by the end of 1428. The bridge at Orléans had been destroyed shortly before the siege lifted. The French had lost control of all other river crossings. Three swift and numerically small battles at Jargeau, Meung-sur-Loire, and Beaugency demonstrated renewed French confidence and laid the groundwork for subsequent French offenses on Rheims and Paris. The Loire campaign killed, captured, or disgraced a majority of the top tier of English commanders and decimated the numbers of the highly skilled English longbowmen.

== Tactics ==
English defenses at Meung-sur-Loire consisted of three components: the walled town, the fortification at the bridge, and a large walled castle just outside the town. The castle served as headquarters to the English command of John Talbot, 1st Earl of Shrewsbury and Thomas Scales.

Joan of Arc and Duke John II of Alençon controlled a force that included captains Jean d'Orléans, Gilles de Rais, Jean Poton de Xaintrailles, and La Hire. Estimates of numerical strength vary with the Journal du Siège d'Orléans citing 6,000 – 7,000 for the French, a number that probably counts non-combatants. Bypassing the city and the castle, they staged a frontal assault on the bridge fortifications, conquered it in one day, and installed a garrison. This hampered English movement south of the Loire.

== See also ==
- Medieval warfare

== Bibliography ==
- Devries, Kelly. Joan of Arc: A Military Leader (Gloucestershire: Sutton Publishing, 1999). ISBN 0-7509-1805-5
- Richey, Stephen W. Joan of Arc: The Warrior Saint. (Westport, CT: Praeger, 2003). ISBN 0-275-98103-7
- Allmand, C. The Hundred Years War: England and France at War c. 1300 – 1450. (Cambridge: Cambridge University Press, 1988). ISBN 0-521-31923-4
