= Ville-Dommange =

- Commune
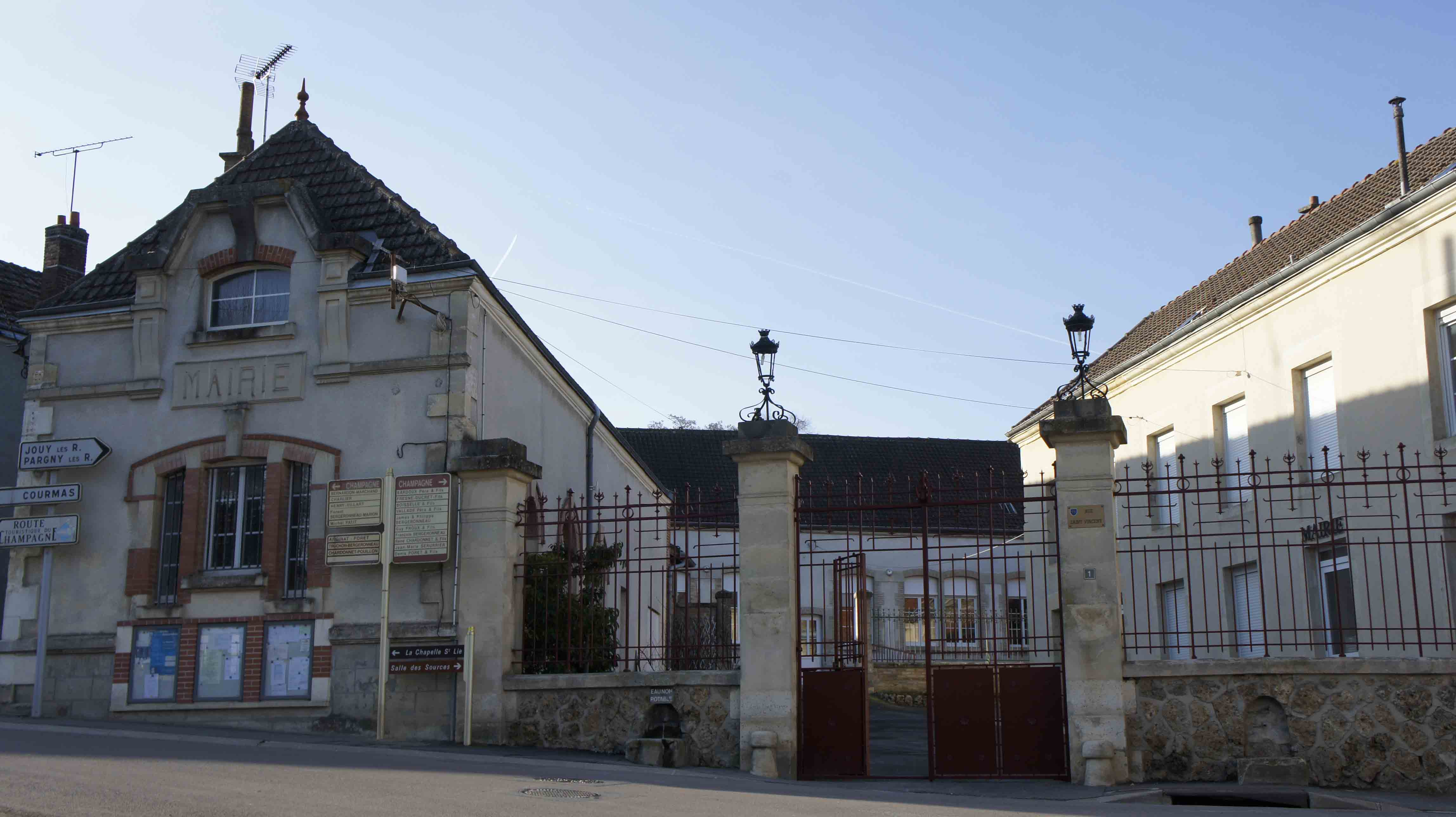
- The town hall in Ville-Dommange

- Coat of arms
- Location of Ville-Dommange
- Location within France Location within Grand Est
- Coordinates: 49°12′07″N 3°55′48″E
- Country: France
- Region: Grand Est
- Department: Marne
- Arrondissement: Reims
- Canton: Fismes-Montagne de Reims
- Intercommunality: CU Grand Reims

Government
  - Mayor (2020–2026): Frédéric Massonot
- Area^{1}: 3.4 km^{2} (1.3 sq mi)
- Elevation: 250 m (820 ft)
- Population (2023): 407
  - Density: 120/km^{2} (310/sq mi)
- Time zone: UTC+01:00 (CET)
  - Summer (DST): UTC+02:00 (CEST)
- INSEE/Postal code: 51622 /51390
- ^{1} French Land Register data, which excludes lakes, ponds, glaciers > 1 km^{2} (0.386 sq mi or 247 acres) and river estuaries.

Ville-Dommange (French pronunciation: [vil dɔmɑ̃ʒ]) is a commune in the Marne department in north-eastern France.

== See also ==
- Communes of the Marne department
