= Pardus the Hermit =

- Died: 6th century
- Venerated in: Eastern Orthodoxy
- Feast: December 15
- Attributes: lion

Saint Pardus (died 6th century) was a Roman who lived in Palestine. In his youth, he had worked as a camel driver. Once when he traveled to Jericho he witnessed a boy accidentally trampled to death under the legs of his fleet of camels, and from fear of retribution, he fled into hiding and took monastic vows at Mount Arion.

Bearing great feelings of guilt for the death of the boy, Pardus decided to give himself up in an act of extreme penance and offer himself, defenceless, to be eaten by a lion. He entered the den of a lion, but after repeated provocations the lion simply ignored the saint and refused to eat him. With this the monk concluded that God, in his love and grace, had forgiven him of any wrong he may have done.

Pardus then returned to his dwelling at Mt. Arion to live out the rest of his life in asceticism and prayer, dying in the 6th century.

Pardus the Hermit is commemorated 15 December in the Eastern Christian Churches.

== See also ==
- Christian monasticism
- Stylites
- Poustinia
