= Mesmin =

French saint (died c. 520)

Saint Mesmin [Maximin]
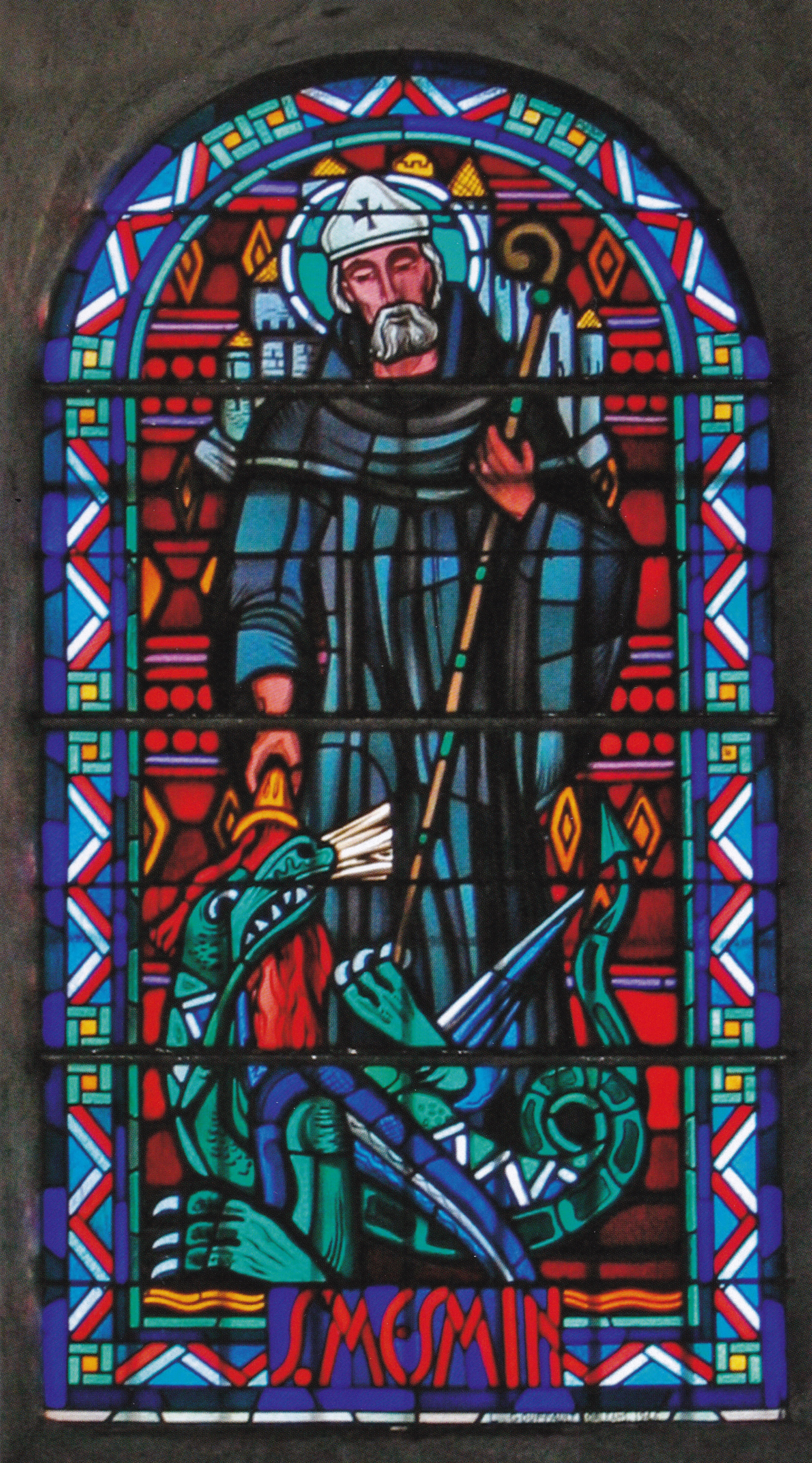
- Saint Mesmin, l'église Saint-Mesmin

Abbot of Micy Abbey
- Died: December 15, 520
- Venerated in: Roman Catholic Church
- Feast: December 15

Mesmin (Maximin, Maximinus) (died c. 520 AD) is a French saint associated with the Bishopric of Orléans. He was the second abbot of Micy Abbey, founded by his uncle, Euspicius.

== Life ==
Mesmin was the nephew of Euspicius, archpriest of Verdun. When the city was under siege, Euspicius went to Clovis I and asked clemency for the rebels. The king was so impressed, he took an interest in Euspicius and Mesmin's activities. In 508, Euspicius was looking for a place of retreat and found an unoccupied royal villa called Micy near Orléans, at the confluence of the Loire and Loiret rivers. He received the domain of Micy from Clovis in order to establish a monastery there.

Euspicius became the first abbot of Micy Abbey. Upon his death in 510, Mesmin became abbot. During his tenure the religious life there flourished notably. The rule followed was that of the Eastern hermits observed by the followers of St. Anthony and St. Basil. These rules had been brought to the West by John Cassian and Martin of Tours. The monks of Micy contributed much to the civilization of the Orléans region; they cleared and drained the lands and taught the semi-barbarous inhabitants the worth and dignity of agricultural work. From Micy Abbey, monastic life spread within and around the diocese of Orleans. Saint Lié, who later became a hermit in the forest of Orléans, was a monk under Mesmin; as was Leonard of Noblac.

== Dragon cave of Béraire ==
Across the river from the abbey, on the north shore of the Loire was a Gallo-Roman villa on a cliff overlooking the river. It was called the Villa Berarii after Berarius, its one time owner; and the nearby village was called Béraire. Below the cliff was a natural cave where Mesmin would often go for solitude and prayer. The cave is near a towpath that was part of the Via Turonensis, a route from Paris to Compostela.

Local legend says he fought a dragon there (Grotte du dragon de Béraire). This legend can be compared to Druidic ceremonies which persisted at the beginning of the Christian era.

Mesmin died on December 15, 520 and was buried in the cave of the dragon of Béraire. Around 550, a church was erected above the tomb of Saint Mesmin on the site of the old villa. The cave became a place of pilgrimage until the arrival of the Normans. Béraire became known as La Chapelle-Saint-Mesmin. Around 675, his relics were transferred to an oratory at Orléans. In 1493, the reliquary of Saint-Mesmin was entrusted to the abbey of Saint-Mesmin de Micy. Part of the relics of Saint Mesmin were destroyed by Huguenots in 1562; the rest are kept in the church of Saint-Mesmin in La Chapelle-Saint-Mesmin.

== Sainte Mesme ==
According to her legend, Mesme was the daughter of the Frankish king Dordanus, and the sister of Saint Mesmin. One of the servants of the house of Dordanus introduced her to the Christian religion without her relatives knowing it. Furious to learn that his daughter was denying the pagan gods, he asked his son Mesmin to cut off his sister's head to save the honor of the family. Saint Mesmin buried the head of his sister and a miraculous spring gushed forth, which cured fevers. There is a fountain commemorating this story in the village of Sainte-Mesme near Dourdan.

This Mesme is not to be confused with Saint Mesme (Mexme), a disciple of Martin of Tours, and founding abbot of the Abbey of Chinon who died of old age.
