= Meung-sur-Loire =

Commune in Centre-Val de Loire, France

- Commune
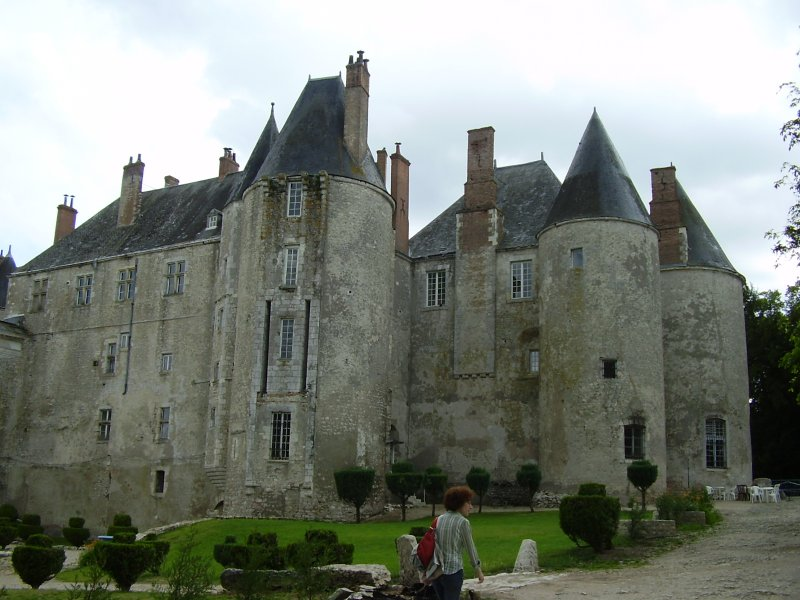
- Château of Meung-sur-Loire

- Coat of arms
- Location of Meung-sur-Loire
- Location within France Location within Centre-Val de Loire
- Coordinates: 47°49′46″N 1°41′57″E
- Country: France
- Region: Centre-Val de Loire
- Department: Loiret
- Arrondissement: Orléans
- Canton: Meung-sur-Loire

Government
  - Mayor (2023–2026): Aurore Caro
- Area^{1}: 20.35 km^{2} (7.86 sq mi)
- Elevation: 100 m (330 ft)
- Highest elevation: 113 m (371 ft)
- Lowest elevation: 82 m (269 ft)
- Population (2023): 6,670
  - Density: 328/km^{2} (849/sq mi)
- Time zone: UTC+01:00 (CET)
  - Summer (DST): UTC+02:00 (CEST)
- INSEE/Postal code: 45203 /45130
- Website: Official website
- ^{1} French Land Register data, which excludes lakes, ponds, glaciers > 1 km^{2} (0.386 sq mi or 247 acres) and river estuaries.

Meung-sur-Loire (French pronunciation: [mœ̃ syʁ lwaʁ]) is a commune in the Loiret department, north-central France.

It was the site of the Battle of Meung-sur-Loire in 1429.

== Geography ==
Meung-sur-Loire lies 15 km to the west of Orléans on the north bank of the river Loire at the confluence with the Mauves. The Mauves, actually three rivers, have their source in the water table of the productive agricultural region of the Beauce.

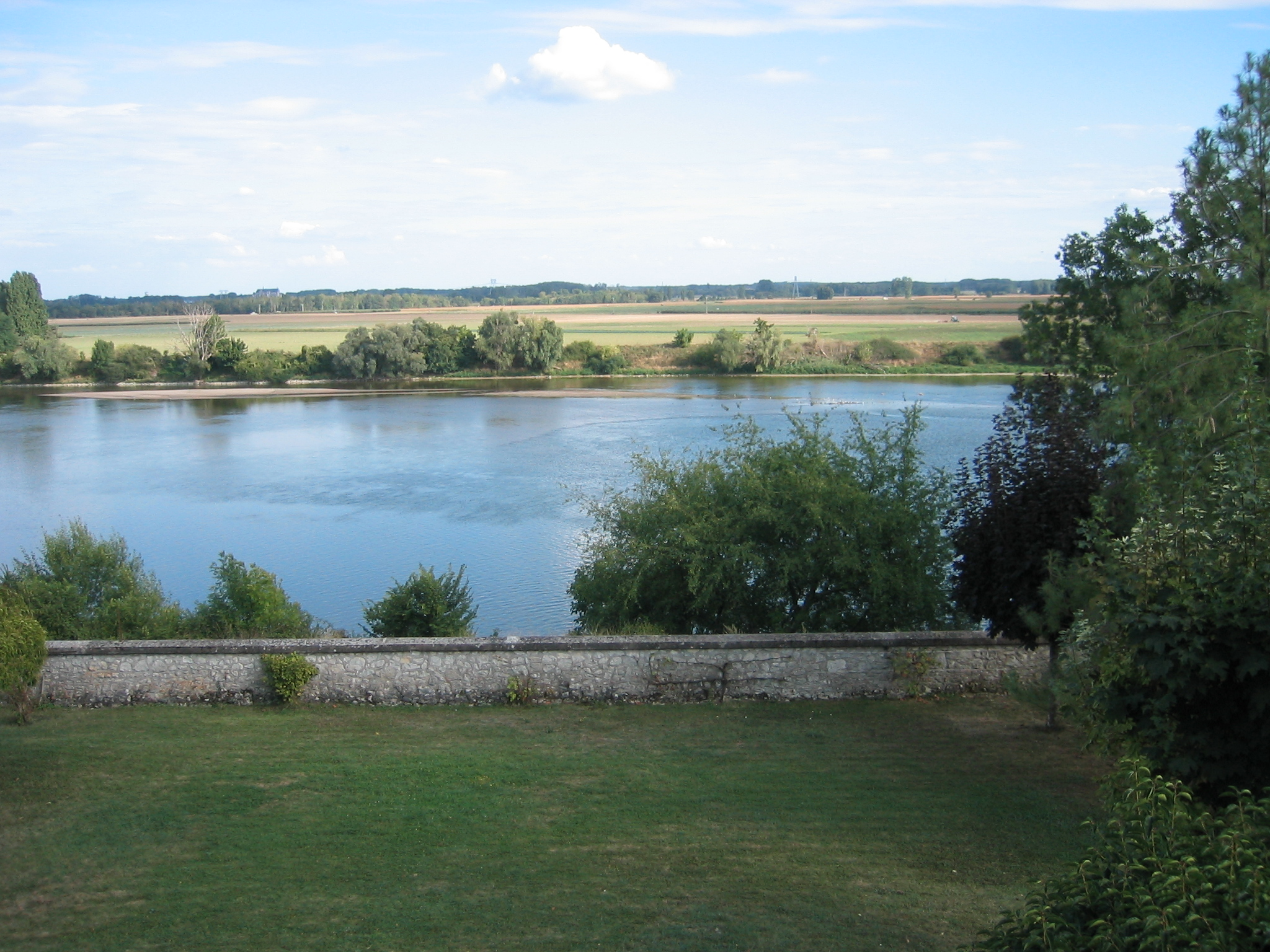
The Loire at Meung-sur-Loire

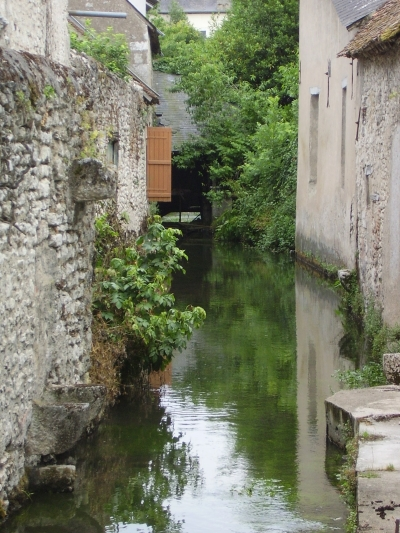
The Mauve in Meung-sur-Loire

== History ==
There is evidence of Mesolithic settlements at "Mousseau" and "La Haute-Murée".

A Gallo-Roman fortified village recorded as Magdunum was built in the marais adjoining the river, which in 409 was fired by the invading Alans. The marais was drained, according to tradition by Saint Liphard around the year 520. The canalisation formed the watercourses known as the mauves. He went on to build the chapel which was to become the monastery and the abbey. His relics were deposited in the church in 1104, the year after Louis VI had founded as fortress.

During the 12th century the church was rebuilt in the gothic style, and fortified accommodation for the abbot built alongside. Jeanne d'Arc visited in 1429, and this was the site of the Battle of Meung-sur-Loire. The complex was restored in 1570, again during the 19th century and again in 1985.

The river defined the town. In 1857 no less than 38 mills had the right to use the waters of the rivers to power themselves.

== Population ==
Historical population
Year	Pop.	±% p.a.
1968	4,116	—
1975	4,601	+1.60%
1982	5,604	+2.86%
1990	5,993	+0.84%
1999	6,254	+0.47%
2007	6,137	−0.24%
2012	6,115	−0.07%
2017	6,440	+1.04%
2023	6,670	+0.59%
Source: INSEE

== Fiction ==
In fiction, it has been described by Alexandre Dumas in The Three Musketeers as the village where d'Artagnan, en route to join the King's Musketeers in Paris, first encounters the villainous Comte de Rochefort. Also in fiction, Meung-sur-Loire is the country home of Chief Inspector Jules Maigret, Georges Simenon's classic crime fiction character. Maigret and his wife Louise eventually retire to their Meung-sur-Loire home, where he spends his time fishing (pike), and she tends, according to her sister, any number of animals.

== Points of interest ==
- The town is twinned with Lymm in Cheshire, England
- Arboretum des Prés des Culands
- Château de Meung-sur-Loire

== Notable residents ==
- Baldric of Dol (1046-1130), bishop, poet and author, born in Meung
- Jean de Meun (c. 1240 – c. 1305), author of the Roman de la Rose
- Maurice Larrouy (1882–1939), winner of the 1917 Prix Femina, died in Meung
- Gaston Couté (1880–1911), French libertarian poet and songwriter lived here in his childhood and is buried in Meung. A museum in the local of the library is dedicated to his life and works.
- Alain Corneau (1943–2010), film director and writer who was born in Meung-sur-Loire.

== See also ==
- Communes of the Loiret department
