= Holly Society of America =

- Formation: 1947; 79 years ago
- Type: Nonprofit
- Purpose: Cultivation and research of the genus Ilex
- Headquarters: 309 Buck Street
- Location: Millville, New Jersey, U.S.
- Region served: Worldwide
- Publication: Holly Society Journal
- Website: www.hollysociety.org

The Holly Society of America is a non-profit organization with a mission to stimulate interest, promote research, and collect and disseminate information about the genus Ilex (holly). It is located at 309 Buck Street, Millville, New Jersey; despite its name, it represents members from around the world.

The society was established in 1947. Today it maintains the authoritative list of registered holly cultivars (as the International Cultivation Registration Authority for cultivated Ilex since 1958), funds research, and publishes the Holly Society Journal. It also provides guidelines for an official Holly Arboretum or Experimental Test Center, and recognizes organizations meeting these guidelines. Twenty arboreta have received such recognition to date, including arboreta in France, Belgium, and Korea.

== Selected publications ==
- International Checklist of Cultivated Ilex - Part 1, Ilex opaca, National Arboretum Contribution No. 3, 1973.
- International Checklist of Cultivated Ilex - Part 2 Ilex crenata Thunberg ex J.A. Murray, National Arboretum Contribution No. 6, 1992.
- Gene K. Eisenbeiss, "Ilex Cultivar Registration List, 1958-1993", Holly Society Journal 13(3). 1995.
- Barton M. Bauers Sr., A Guide to Identification of Cultivated Ilex, 1993.
