= Vacquerie =

Vacquerie may refer to:

== Surname ==
- Auguste Vacquerie (1819-1895), French journalist
- Robert Picard de La Vacquerie (1893-1969), French Catholic prelate

== Place ==
- La Vacquerie, a former commune in the Calvados department in the Normandy region in north-western France
- La Vacquerie-et-Saint-Martin-de-Castries, a commune in the Hérault department in southern France
- Vacquerie-le-Boucq, a commune in the Pas-de-Calais department in the Hauts-de-France region of France
