= Louis-Sextius de Jarente de La Bruyère =

French prelate (1706–1788)

His Grace Louis-Sextius de Jarente de La Bruyère COHS
- Bishop of Orléans
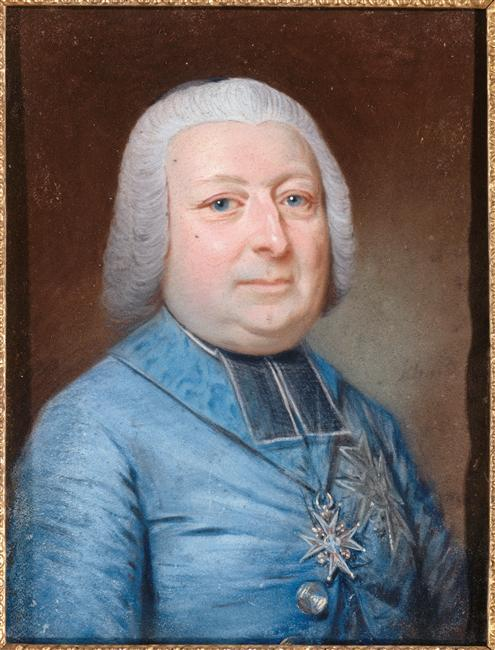
- Church: Roman Catholic Church
- Diocese: Orléans
- See: Cathedral of the Holy Cross of Orléans
- Installed: 13 March 1758
- Term ended: 28 May 1788
- Predecessor: Louis-Joseph de Montmorency-Laval
- Successor: Louis de Jarente de Senas d'Orgeval
- Other post: Bishop of Digne (1747–58)

Personal details
- Born: 30 September 1706 Marseille, France
- Died: 29 January 1788 (aged 81) Meung-sur-Loire, France

Louis-Sextius de Jarente de La Bruyère (Marseille, 30 September 1706 – Meung-sur-Loire, 29 January 1788) was a French prelate born in 1706. He was Bishop of Digne in 1747, Bishop of Orléans in 1757, and made commander in the Order of the Holy Spirit in 1762.

== Biography ==
=== Early life ===
Born into a family of old Provençal nobility, Louis-Sextius de Jarente de La Bruyère was the son of Geoffroy-Alexandre de Jarente (b. 1670) and his wife Marie-Elisabeth de Lallier de La Tour (b. 1680).

=== Ecclesiastical career ===
He was first canon of the Abbey of Saint-Victor de Marseille, where he knew the famous Belsunce, Bishop of Marseille.

Bishop of Digne in 1747, he was named abbot of Saint-Honorat de Lérins in 1752. He was made Bishop of Orleans in 1757 and commander of the Order of the Holy Spirit in 1762. The following year, he is named Abbot of Saint Vincent.

Well liked in court, he was appointed Minister of Profit Sheets and was responsible for distributing the revenues of the various abbeys, churches and their farmland from 1757 to 1771. During this period, 75 bishoprics and 337 abbeys are attributed, which alludes to the importance of this very coveted and lucrative position. The solicitors crowd around him.

On 8 July 1767, he attended with his colleague Louis-André de Grimaldi, Bishop of Mans, the blessing of enthronement of Venture-Gabrielle de Pontevès de Maubousquet, the new abbess of the Abbey of Maubuisson, by the Bishop of Marseilles, Jean-Baptiste de Belloy.

Finding church life mundane, he frequented salons earning a good living. "Jarente was the victim of numerous pamphlets accusing him of having had for his mistress Guimard". Thus, at the end of the 1770s, Mlle. Guimard, who was in need of money, had the idea - which may have been suggested to him - to open an "income bureau", offering to forward Jarente requests from clergy for salary increases, these claims with varying bribes depending on the size of the claim.

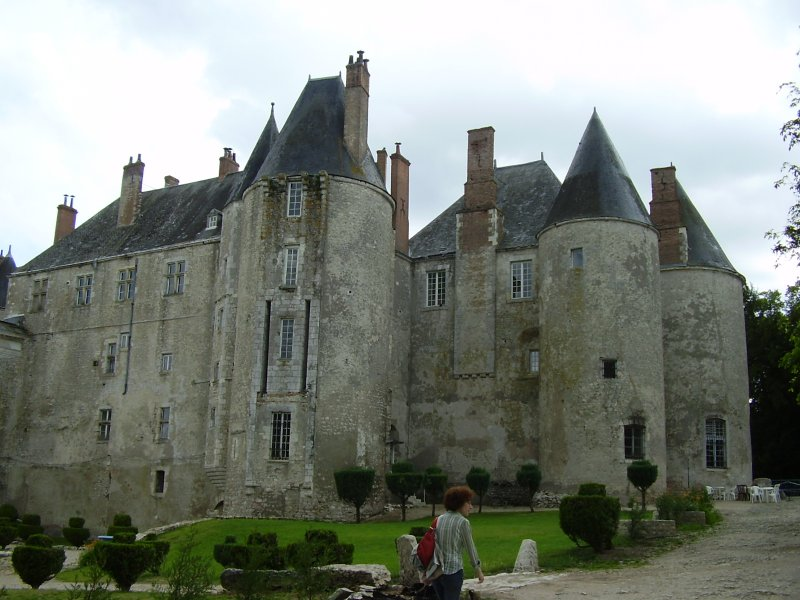
The Château de Meung-sur-Loire, residence of the Bishops of Orléans.

Louis XVI, informed of the scheme, became angry and reprimanded Bishop Jarente. Being close with the Duke of Choiseul, he was dismissed in 1771 and retired to his Château de Meung-sur-Loire, residence of the Bishops of Orleans that he had sumptuously redecorated.

He ordered the reconstruction of the Orleans Cathedral.

In 1780, he had his nephew, Louis de Jarente de Senas d'Orgeval, appointed as coadjutor.

== Bibliography ==
- Dictionnaire de biographie française.
- Pierre-Victor Malouet, Mémoires de Pierre-Victor Malouet, 1868, p. 28
- Illiers (Louis d'), Deux prélats d'Ancien Régime : les Jarente, Monaco, Editions du Rocher, 1948, p. 2-75.
