= Namatius (disambiguation) =

Namatius was an early bishop of Clermont now recognised as a saint by Roman Catholics.

Namatius may also refer to:

- Namatius (bishop of Vienne), died 559
- Namatius (bishop of Orléans), died 587
