= Félix Dupanloup =

French bishop

His Excellency, The Most Reverend Félix Dupanloup
- Bishop of Orléans
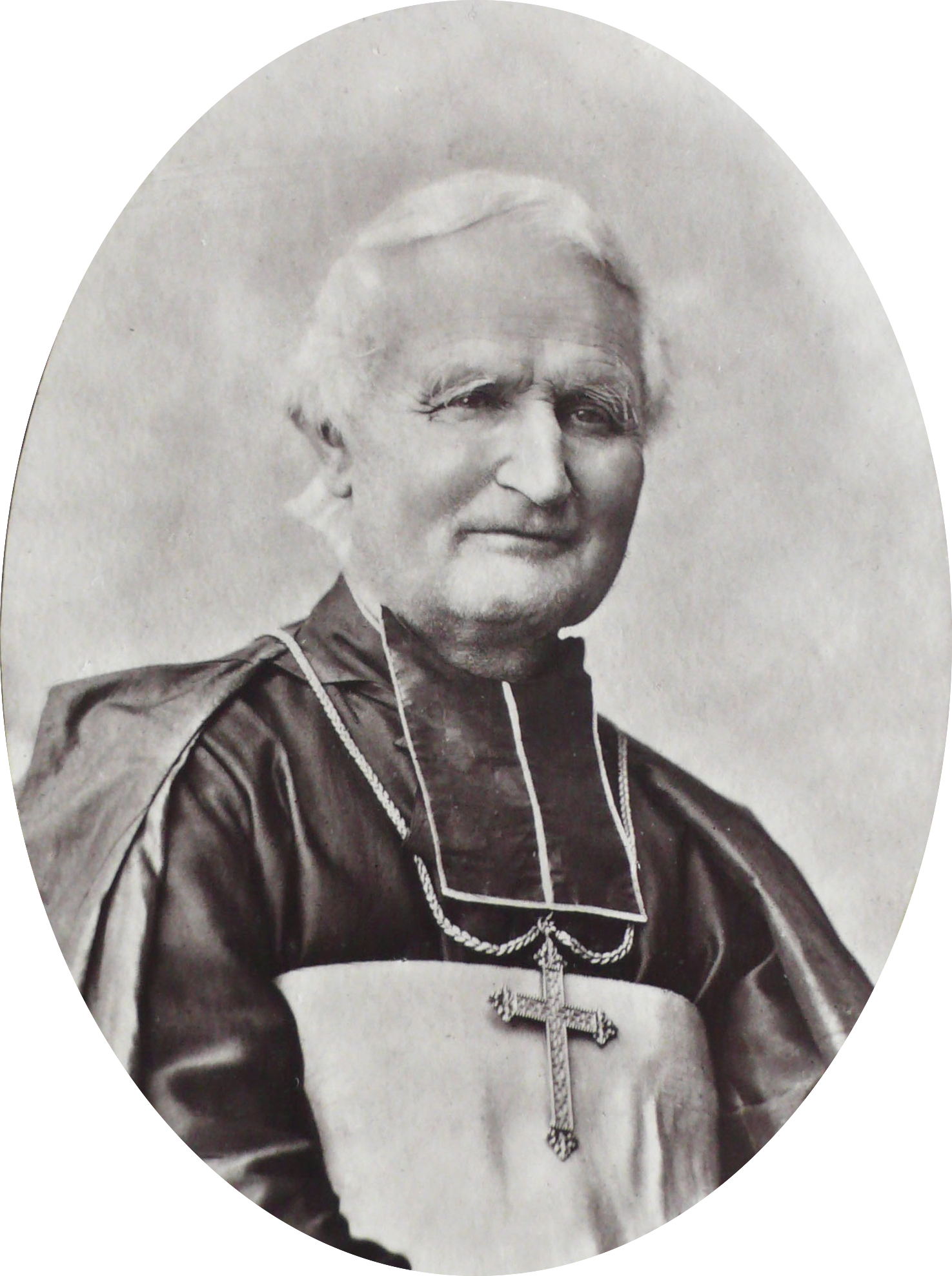
- Portrait of Félix Dupanloup, by François-Marie Gobinet de Villecholle, c. 1876.
- Appointed: 16 April 1849
- Term ended: 11 October 1878
- Predecessor: Jean-Jacques Fayet
- Successor: Pierre-Hector Coullié

Personal details
- Born: Félix Antoine Philibert Dupanloup; 3 January 1802 Saint-Félix, Haute-Savoie
- Died: 11 October 1878 (aged 76) La Combe-de-Lancey, Isère
- Denomination: Roman Catholic

Félix Antoine Philibert Dupanloup (3 January 1802 – 11 October 1878) was a French Catholic prelate who served as Bishop of Orléans from 1849 to 1878. He was among the leaders of Liberal Catholicism in France.

== Biography ==
Dupanloup was born at Saint-Félix, in Upper Savoy, (which at the time was part of the Kingdom of Piedmont-Sardinia rather than France) an illegitimate son of Prince Camillo Borghese. In his earliest years he was confided to the care of his brother, a priest in the diocese of Chambéry. In 1810 he was sent to a pensionnat ecclésiastique at Paris. Thence he went to the seminary of Saint-Nicolas-du-Chardonnet in 1813, and was transferred to the seminary of Saint Sulpice at Paris in 1820. In 1825 he was ordained priest, and was appointed vicar of the Madeleine at Paris. For a time he was tutor to the Orléans princes. He became the founder of a celebrated academy at St Hyacinthe, and received a letter from Gregory XVI lauding his work there, and calling him Apostolus juventutis.

He was elected to the Académie française in 1854, occupying the thirty-eighth chair and leading the academy's "religious party", in which capacity he manoeuvred against the election of agnostic intellectuals. Dupanloup resigned in 1875 after Émile Littré, an agnostic, was elected to the academy.

When made bishop of Orléans in 1849, he pronounced a fervid panegyric on Joan of Arc, which attracted attention in England as well as France. Joan of Arc was later canonized, due partly to Dupanloup's efforts. Before this, he had been sent by Archbishop Aifre to Rome, and had been appointed Roman prelate and protonotary apostolic.

For thirty years he remained a notable figure in France, doing his utmost to arouse his countrymen from religious indifference. He was a distinguished educationist who fought for the retention of the Latin classics in the schools and instituted the celebrated catechetical method of St Sulpice. Among his publications are:

- De l'Éducation (1850)
- De la Haute Éducation Intellectuelle (3 vols., 1866)
- Œuvres Choisies (1861, 4 vols.)
- Histoire de Jésus (1872), a counterblast to Renan's Vie de Jésus.

In ecclesiastical policy his views were moderate. Both before and during the First Vatican Council, he opposed the definition of the dogma of papal infallibility as inopportune, but after the definition was among the first to accept the dogma.

Dupanloup died on 11 October 1878 at the château of La Combe-de-Lancey.

== Memory ==
In the work known as Illustrissimi, a collection of letters written by Pope John Paul I when he was Patriarch of Venice, Dupanloup is one of the "recipients" of the letters. There are 40 letters in all, mainly to people in Italian history and fiction, but also to internationally well known fictional and historical characters such as Pinocchio, Charles Dickens, Hippocrates, and Jesus. Each of the letters tend to be droll and witty, but cleverly turned into a short sermon in order to make a point, whether it is on fashion, pornography, capitalism, or the communications industry.

In his book My Life and Loves, volume III, chapter 15, Frank Harris tells of an anecdote he told Prince Edward, The Prince of Wales, about the bishop:

"There is a story told," I said, "of Monseigneur Dupanloup, Bishop of Orleans, who was supposed to be one of the wittiest men of his time. He was at dinner once with a lady who made a peculiar little noise and then proceeded to shuffle with her feet on the parquet so as to cover the indiscretion with similar sounds.

'Oh, Madame,' said the witty Bishop, 'please don't trouble to find a rhyme; it is not important.'" The Prince laughed but did not prize the witty word at its real worth.

== Works ==
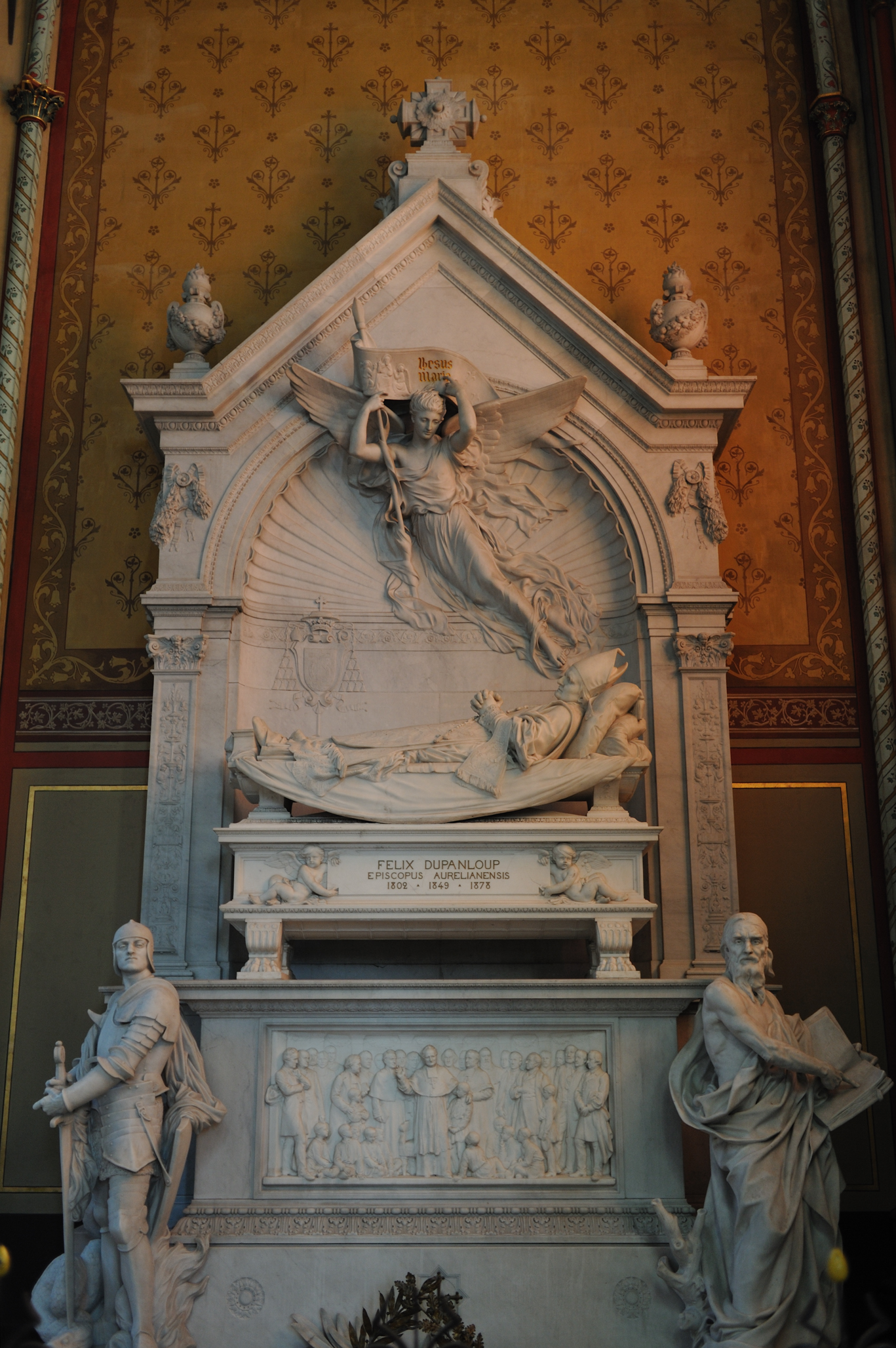
Dupanloup's mausoleum in the Orléans Cathedral, by Henri Chapu, 1888–1891.

- (1845). De la Pacification Religieuse. Lecoffre et Cie.
- (1860). La Souveraineté Pontificale selon le Droit Catholique et le Droit Européen. J. Lecoffre et Cie.
- (1860). Réponse de Mgr l'Évêque d'Orléans à M. le Baron Molroguier. Paris: Charles Douniol.
- (1861). Défense de la Liberté de l'Église. R. Ruffet.
- (1865). La Convention du 8 Décembre. Suivie d'une Lettre au Journal des Débats. Paris: Charles Douniol.
- (1866). L'Athéisme et le Péril Social. Paris: Charles Douniol et Cie.
- (1866). Entretiens sur la Prédication Populaire. Paris: Charles Douniol.
- (1866). De la Haute Éducation Intellectuelle. Paris: Charles Douniol.
- (1867). Louis XVII, sa Vie, son Agonie, sa Mort: captivité de la famille royale au Temple. H. Plon.
- (1869). L' Enfant. Paris: Charles Douniol.
- (1869). La Femme Studieuse. Paris: Charles Douniol.
- (1872). De l'Éducation. Paris: Charles Douniol et Cie. [3 volumes].
  - De l'Éducation en Général.
  - De l'Autorité et du respect dans l'Éducation.
  - Les Hommes d'Éducation.
- (1875). Étude sur la Franc-maçonnerie. Paris: Charles Douniol.
- (1878). Premières Lettres a Messieurs les Membres du Conseil Municipal de Paris sur le Centenaire de Voltaire. Paris: Société Bibliographique.
- (1879). Lettres sur l'Éducation des Filles et sur les Études qui Convienment aux Femmes dans le Monde. Paris: Charles Douniol.
- (1920). Le Mariage Chrétien. Paris: P. Téqui.

=== Works in English translation ===
- (1860). The Papal Sovereignty. London: Catholic Publishing and Bookselling Company.
- (1869). Studious Women. Boston: Patrick Donahoe.
- (1869). Joan of Arc. London: Burns and Oates.
- (1875). The Child. Boston: Thomas B. Noonan & Co.
- (1875). A Study of Freemasonry. London: Burns and Oates (American edition: Newark, N.J.: J.J. O'Connor & Co, 1876).
- (1890). The Ministry of Catechising. London: Griffith Farran & Co.
- (1891). The Ministry of Preaching. London: Griffith Farran, Okeden & Welsh.

=== Selected articles ===
- (1867). "Learned Women and Studious Women," Part II, The Catholic World, Vol. VI, pp. 24–43, 209–226.
