= Euverte d'Orléans =

Early Christian bishop

Saint Euverte Bishop of Orléans
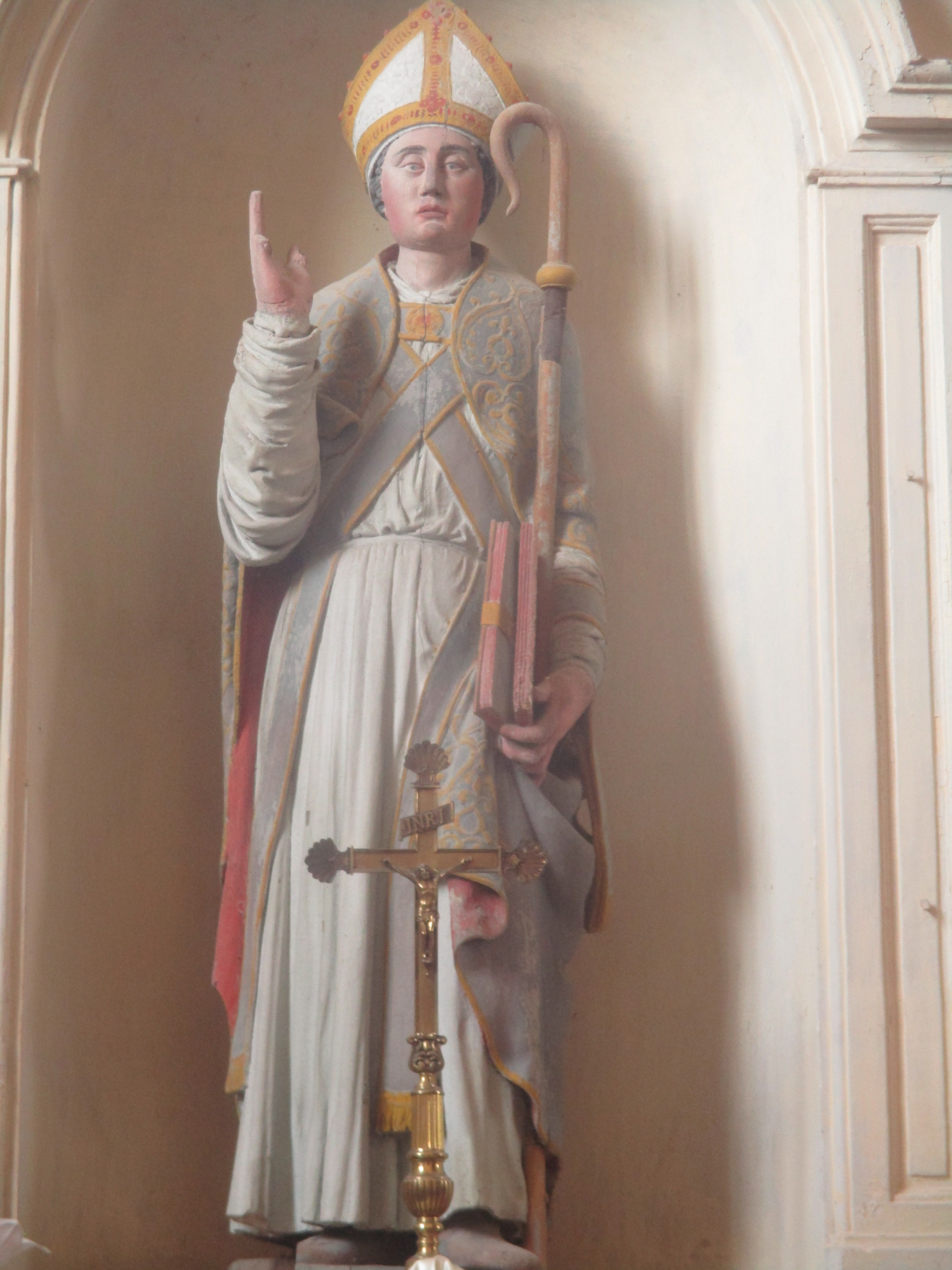
- Statue of Saint Euverte in the Church of Bussy-le-Repos
- Born: 4th century
- Died: c. 340
- Feast: 7 September

Euverte d'Orléans or St. Euverte (died 7 September in Orléans) also known as Evurtius, Evortius or Eortius, was the fourth Bishop of Orléans in the 4th century.

== Life ==
According to Alban Butler, Euverte flourished during the reign of Constantine the Great. Euverte was a subdeacon of the Church of Rome. He came to Gaul and was elected bishop of Orléans. He was concerned about the spiritual life of his people in a difficult time. He chose his coadjutor, Aignan of Orleans as his successor.

His name is famous in the ancient western Martyrologies, but his history is of no authority. The day (7 September) was transmitted by martyrologies in order to celebrate his anniversary. Three translations have been made of his relics. A famous abbey at Orleans bears his name. The first Life of Saint Aignan, written between 474 and 530, is the oldest text attributing the construction of a Saint Euverte cathedral at Orléans.

== Sarum entry ==
The Martyrology of the Use of Sarum includes the following.

At Orlyauce the deposicyon of saynt Eurcy a confessour, that (as is wryten in his legend) was the fyrst subdeacon of the chirche of Rome, & after by a myracle in a sygne of a dove, he was electe bisshop of the same cite.

== Veneration ==
Euverte is a patron saint of the city of Orleans.

== Legacy ==
Sainte Croix - Saint Euverte primary school is located in Orleans.

== Bibliography ==
- Butler, Alban (1799), The Lives of the Primitive Fathers, Martyrs, and Other Principal Saints: Compiled from Original Monuments and Other Authentic Records, vol. 9, J. Moir
- Histoire d'Orléans et de son terroir. Roanne/Le Coteau [France]: Horvath. 1982–1983. ISBN 2-7171-0276-0.
- La fondation des églises locales, le culte des saints et des reliques : [Actes du] colloque d'Orléans, 19-20 octobre 2000. Le Blanc: Rencontre avec le patrimoine religieux. 2001. ISBN 2-911948-15-7.
- Schmitt, Jean-Claude (2016). Les rythmes au Moyen Âge. [Paris]: Gallimard. ISBN 978-2-07-017769-1.
- Duchesne, Louis (1843-1922) Auteur du texte (1907–1910). Fastes épiscopaux de l'ancienne Gaule. Provinces du Sud-Est / par L. Duchesne,...
