= Gabriel de L'Aubespine =

French bishop

His Grace Gabriel de L'Aubespine KOHS
- Bishop of Orléans
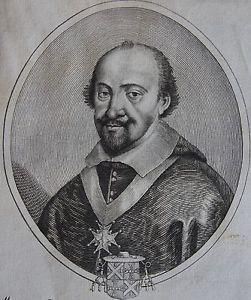
- Church: Roman Catholic Church
- Diocese: Orléans
- See: Cathedral of the Holy Cross of Orléans
- Installed: 15 March 1604
- Term ended: 15 August 1630
- Predecessor: Jean de L'Aubespine
- Successor: Nicolas de Netz

Personal details
- Born: 26 January 1579 Paris, France
- Died: 15 August 1630 (aged 51) Orléans, France

Gabriel de L'Aubespine (26 January 1579 - 15 August 1630) was a French prelate of the sixteenth and seventeenth centuries. Bishop of Orléans from 1604 to 1630, he was made a knight in the Order of the Holy Spirit during the reign of Louis XIII on 31 December 1619. A learned man, he authored the liturgical work Veteribus Ecclesia Ritibus, printed in Paris, in 1623.

== Biography ==
Originating from a family from Beauce, merchants and notables of Orleans, known since the middle of the fifteenth century, Gabriel de L'Aubespine was born 26 January 1579, son of Guillaume de L'Aubespine, Baron of Chateauneuf, and Marie de La Chatre; he was the brother of Charles de L'Aubespine, future Keeper of the Seals. He began his studies in Paris where he obtained his bachelorate of theology in 1604 and became socius of the Sorbonne. He was a learned man, respected by his contemporaries for his knowledge of the writings of the Fathers of the Church; Nominal subdeacon of Orleans, he was succeeded by his brother, Guillaume, around 1600. He succeeds his brother Jean de L'Aubespine and was named bishop in 1604, confirmed by the Holy See on 28 March 1604. He died in 1630.

The Duke of Saint-Simon, his grand-nephew by his mother Charlotte de L'Aubespine, drew his portrait in his Memoirs. His impartiality may have suffered.

"The bishop of Orleans, Gabriel de L'Aubespine, elder brother of M. de Chateauneuf who was Keeper of the Seals to the disgrace of the Keeper of the Seals of Marillac, at the end of 1630, which was the famous day of the Dupes. One saw his family among those of the Chancellors and Guards of the Seals of France of Louis XIV, who returned them to him, in his minority, for a short time. Our prelate was bishop of Orleans in 1604 and crowned in Rome, March 28 of the same year, by the hand of Pope Clement VIII. He held one of the first places of the clergy of France by his doctrine and his ability in business, and illustrated it by his piety and his assiduity to his episcopal foundings. He was the soul of the assemblies of the clergy and all matters of doctrine in the Sorbonne and among the bishops. Between several works he has made, his treatise on the Eucharist has made his reputation immortal. He died in Grenoble, a little advanced in age, but consumed with study and work, 15 October 1630, deputy with other prelates of the assembly of the clergy towards the King, who was at Lyons."
— Saint-Simon

== Works ==
- De veteribus ecclesiasticae ritibus observationes: libri duo (1672)
- L'ancienne police de l'église sur l'administration de l'Eucharistie (1629)
- Observationes ecclesiasticae in epitomen redactae et annotatis illustratae a Joanne Georgio Kettenbeillio (etc.) | L'Aubespine, Gabriel de and Kettembeil, Johannes Georgius (1657)
