= Church of Saint-Aignan, Orléans =

Church in Centre-Val de Loire, France

Church of Saint Aignan
- French: Collégiale Saint-Aignan
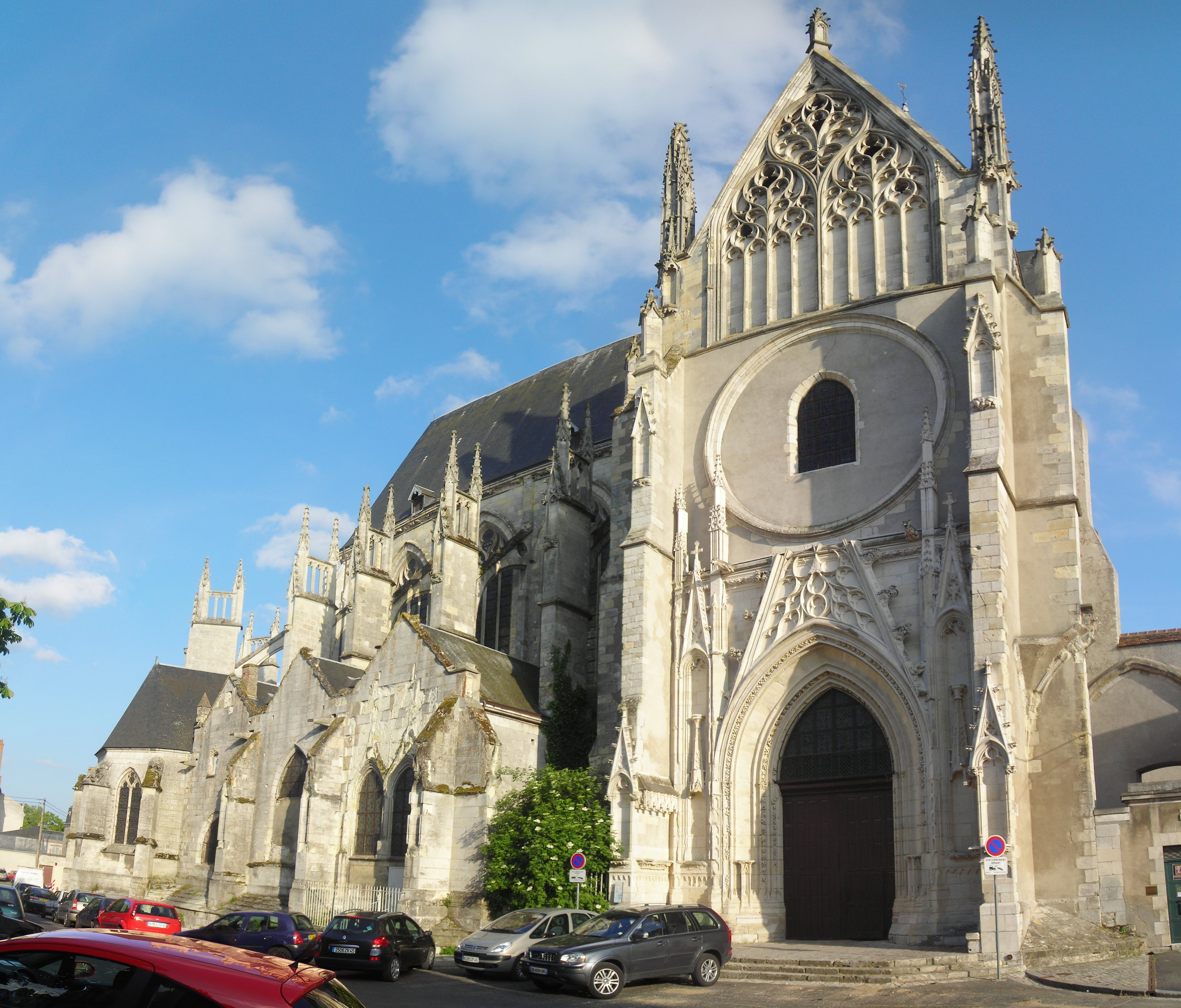
- Church of Saint Aignan
- 47°53′57″N 1°54′56″E
- Location: Orléans, France
- Country: France
- Denomination: Catholic

History
- Status: Collegiate church
- Dedication: Anianus

Architecture
- Functional status: Active
- Style: Gothic Architecture
- Groundbreaking: 1438
- Completed: 1509

Administration
- Archdiocese: Roman Catholic Diocese of Orléans

Monument historique
- Designated: 1910

The Church of Saint-Aignan (French: Collégiale Saint-Aignan) is a collegiate church in the Bourgogne quarter of Orléans on the north bank of the Loire, France. The church is dedicated to Anianus, a 5th-century bishop of Orléans, who, according to legend, persuaded Attila the Hun not to sack the city.

According to Gregory of Tours, there was a basilica with a shrine to Anianus where Bishop Namatius was buried after his death in 587. A monastery dedicated to Anianus existed in the first half of the 7th century, because in 651 its abbot, Leodebodus, left to found a new monastery at Fleury on land donated by King Clovis II. According to the Chronicle of Fredegar, written in the middle of the century, the shrine of Anianus was comparable in importance to that of Saint Martin of Tours. Queen Balthild (died 680) supported reform there by introducing the rule of Benedict and that of the Irish missionary Columbanus.

By the 9th century, the abbacy at Saint-Aignan was the "virtual hereditary possession of a noble family", the counts of Orléans. During the reign of Louis the Pious, Count Odo I (died 834) tried to confiscate all the churches in the Orléanais and usurp the abbacy of Saint-Aignan. Mid-century, control of the monastery passed to the bishops, who also controlled the countship, and later in the century to the Robertian dynasty. To historians of this period, urban Saint-Aignan is more obscure than its rural daughter house at Fleury.

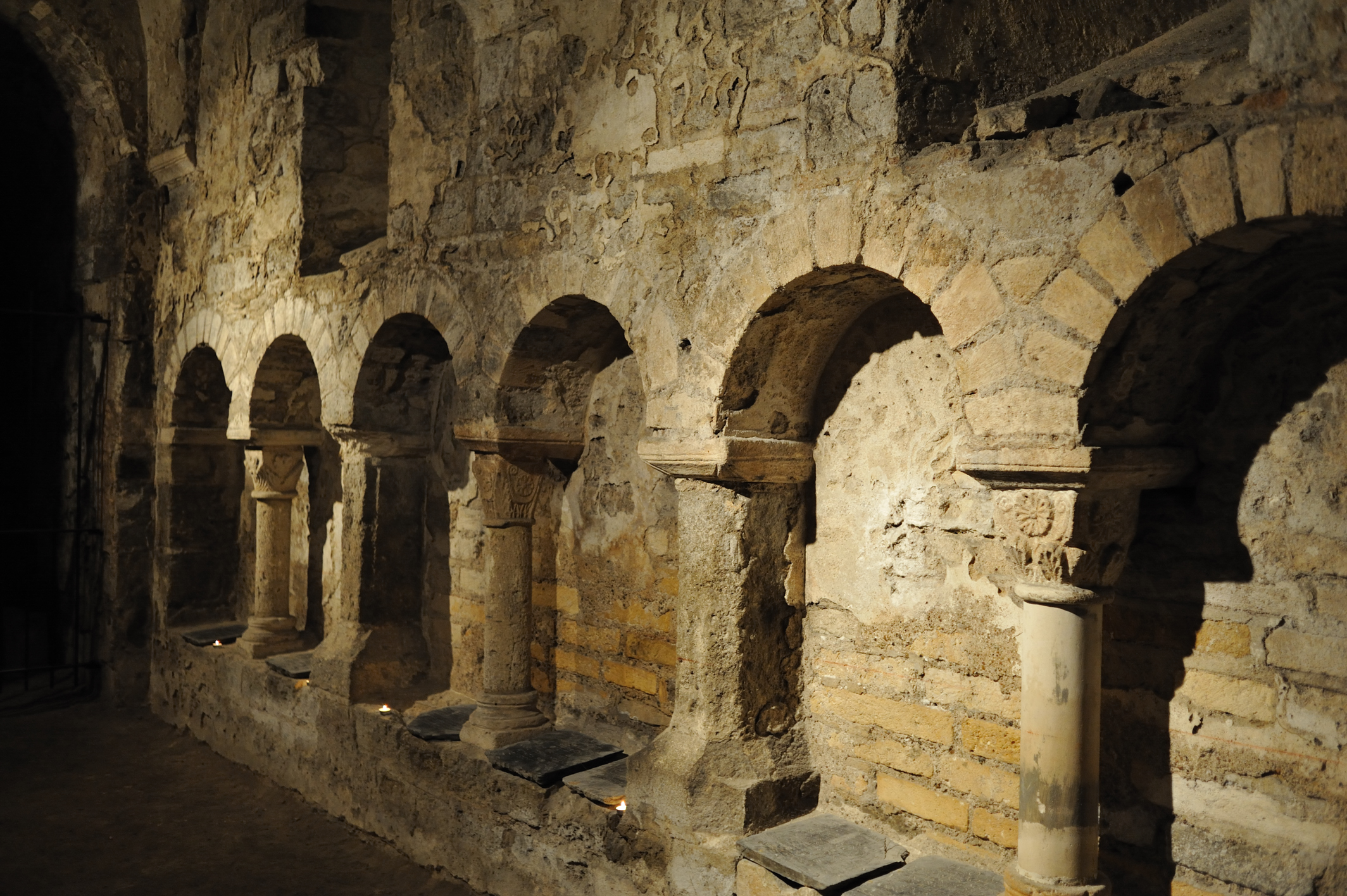
Saint-Aignan Crypt

In the Illatio sancti Benedicti, composed between 1010 and 1018, Theodoric of Fleury recounts a legend then current at Fleury. When some Vikings attacked Fleury by sailing down the Loire, the relics of Benedict of Nursia were brought to Saint-Aignan for safekeeping. The monks there sued to keep them, but by a miracle they were sailed back down the frozen river to Fleury when the danger was past.

The monastery of Saint-Aignan was rededicated in 1029. At the time its main altar was jointly dedicated to Saints Peter and Anianus, while the altar in the choir was dedicated to Anianus alone, whose relics lay in the crypt below it. There were twelve minor altars lining the nave, dedicated to saints of both local and universal importance, but the six local saints whose relics the church possessed did not have any altars, liturgies or hagiographies at all. Shortly after this date, the bones of Saint Euspicius were transferred to Saint-Mesmin de Micy. In the 1070s, an anonymous monk of Saint-Aignan composed the Miracula sancti Aniani, a collection of stories of miracles performed by Anianus.

In 1661, a monk of Saint-Aignan, Robert Hubert, published a collection of documents from the history of Saint-Aignan. Many of these he had forged and they have misled historians ever since.

== Sources ==
- Head, Thomas (1984). "I Vow Myself to be Your Servant: An Eleventh-Century Pilgrim, His Chronicler and His Saint". Historical Reflections / Réflexions Historiques. 11 (3): 215–51.
- Head, Thomas (1990). Hagiography and the Cult of Saints: The Diocese of Orléans, 800–1200. Cambridge University Press.
