= André Fort =

French Roman Catholic prelate (1935–2025)

André Louis Fort
- Bishop Emeritus of Orléans
- Archdiocese: Tours
- Diocese: Orléans
- Installed: 28 November 2002
- Term ended: 27 July 2010
- Predecessor: Gérard Daucourt
- Successor: Jacques Blaquart
- Previous post: Bishop of Perpignan–Elne (1996–2002)

Orders
- Ordination: 8 April 1962 by Lucien-Sidroine Lebrun
- Consecration: 9 July 1995 by Jean Chabbert

Personal details
- Born: 20 September 1935 Chalon-sur-Saône, France
- Died: 19 August 2025 (aged 89)
- Denomination: Roman Catholic
- Education: Pontifical Gregorian University
- Motto: Ut sit Deus omnia in omnibus
- Coat of arms

Styles of André Fort
- Reference style: His Excellency; The Most Reverend
- Spoken style: Your Excellency
- Religious style: Bishop

André Louis Fort (20 September 1935 – 19 August 2025) was a French Roman Catholic prelate. He served as bishop of Perpignan-Elne from 1996 to 2002 and bishop of Orléans.

== Biography ==
Born in Chalon-sur-Saône on 20 September 1935, Fort studied at the Pontifical Gregorian University and was ordained on 8 April 1962 within the Diocese of Autun. He was consecrated as bishop of Perpignan-Elne on 9 July 1995 and took office on 16 January 1996. He was transferred to Orléans on 28 November 2002. During his time as bishop, he emphasized the importance of Catholics not to impose their views on others, but to "make their convictions clearly heard". He publicly supported the anti-abortion March for Life. During the 2007–2008 Year of Solidarity, he encouraged Catholics to look out for one another and reach out to those in need. He welcomed the lifting of the practice of excommunication, and joined a support committee for Pope Benedict XVI. He stirred up controversy for his statements regarding the distribution of condoms to fight against HIV/AIDS, claiming that they cannot provide 100% protection from the virus. He later apologized for his remarks but maintained that condoms are not a miracle solution to fight the virus.

In 2016, three victims of abbot Pierre de Castelet, a chaplain of the Scouts of Europe, and a parish priest in Lorris accused Fort of failure to report a sexual assault on a minor. Fort was allegedly a witness to the July 1993 incident and was indicted by a court in Orléans for failure to report child sexual abuse. He was the first bishop to be prosecuting for failing to report such acts in France since Pierre Pican. In June 2018, he was sent to a Tribunal correctionnel and was sentenced to eight months suspended on 22 November 2018.

Fort died on 19 August 2025, at the age of 89.

Catholic Church titles
Preceded by Gérard Daucourt	Bishop of Orléans; 2002–2010	Succeeded by Lucien-Sidroine Lebrun
Preceded by Jean Chabbert	Bishop of Perpignan–Elne; 1996–2002	Succeeded by André Marceau
