= Jean II, Bishop of Orleans =

French prelate

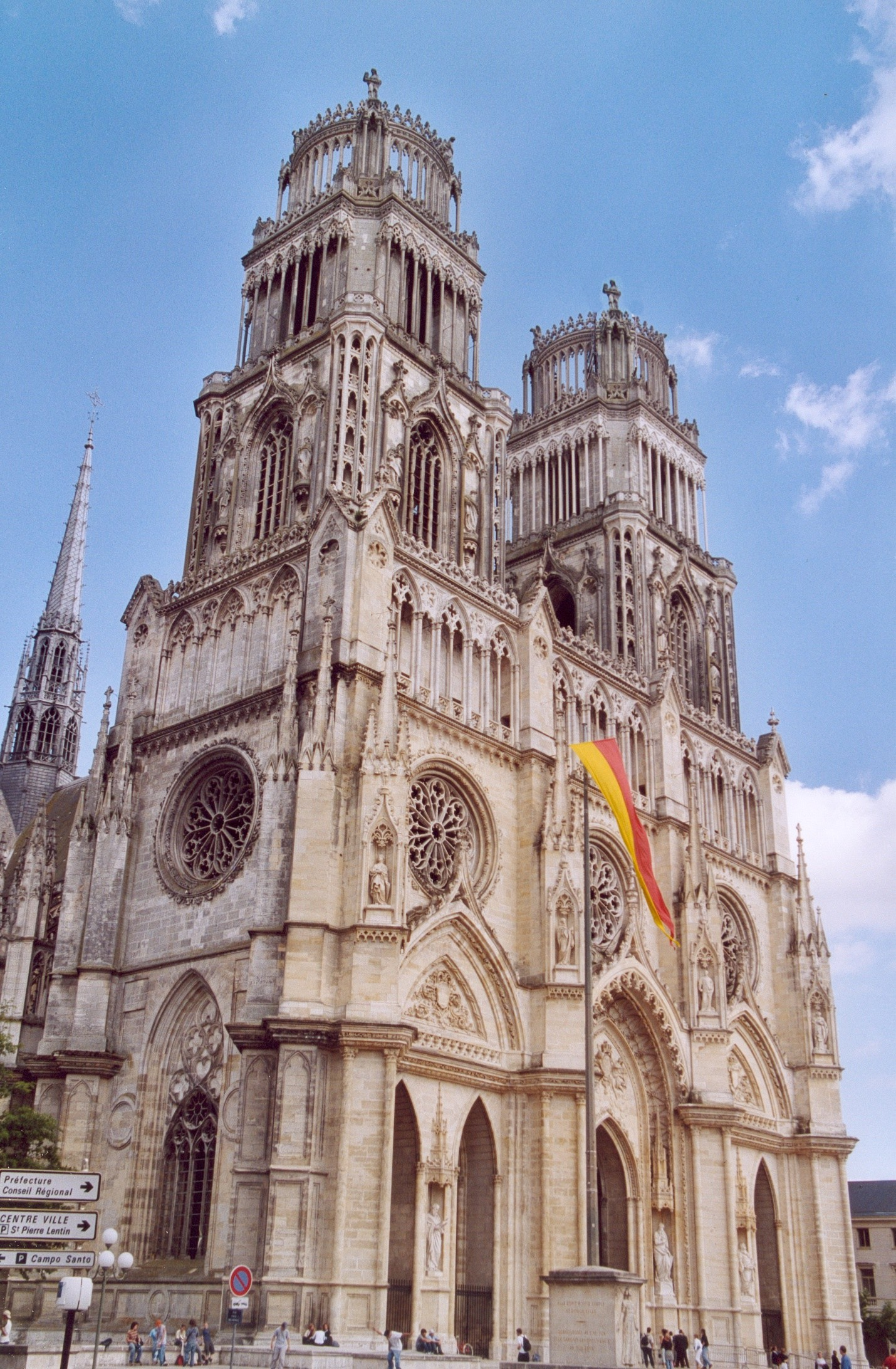
Orléans Cathedral of Sainte-Croix

Jean (II) was a French prelate appointed Bishop of Orleans in 1096, succeeding Bishop Jean (I) in the office, and consecrated in on 1 March 1098. Jean had previously been archdeacon at Tours. He was a nephew of Suger.

In 1100, Ivo, Bishop of Chartres complained bitterly in a letter to Pope Urban II that Jean had been made the Bishop of Orleans despite a reputation for sexual looseness, as well as being underage. Ivo reported that Jean had been given the nickname of "Flora", after a well-known local courtesan, and had become the subject of a number of lewd street songs. In an attempt to head off Jean's elevation to the bishopric, Ivo had previously sent examples of the lurid lyrics to the Archbishop of Lyons but to no avail.
