= Guy Riobé =

French Catholic bishop (d. 1978)

Guy-Marie Riobé
- Bishop of Orléans
- Church: Catholic Church
- Diocese: Diocese of Orléans
- In office: 23 May 1963 – 18 July 1978
- Predecessor: Robert Picard de La Vacquerie
- Successor: Jean-Marie Lustiger
- Previous posts: Titular Bishop of Mulia (1961-1963); Coadjutor Bishop of Orléans (1961-1963)

Orders
- Ordination: 15 June 1935
- Consecration: 28 October 1961 by Pierre Veuillot

Personal details
- Born: 24 April 1911 Rennes, Ille-et-Vilaine, France
- Died: 18 July 1978 (aged 67) Le Grau-du-Roi, Gard, France

Guy-Marie Riobé (1911–1978) was a French Catholic Bishop of Orléans in office 1963 to 1978. He held liberal, progressive views influenced by the climate of the Second Vatican Council.

He became prominent because of an altercation with Admiral Sanguinetti, over France's possession of a nuclear deterrent. He died following a swimming accident. His successor, Jean-Marie Lustiger, avoided any reference to Riobé during his installation after a fifteen-month interregnum (1979).

Riobé promoted a de-centered vision of the priesthood, arguing in favor of the creation of new types of ministries.

Catholic Church titles
New title	Coadjutor bishop of Orléans; 1961	Office abolished
Preceded by István Fiedler	— TITULAR — Bishop of Mulia; 1961	Succeeded by Theodorus van den Tillaart
Preceded by Robert Picard de la Vacquerie	Bishop of Orléans; 1963–1978	Succeeded by Aaron Jean-Marie Lustiger
