= Basilica of Our Lady of Cléry =

Basilica in Loiret, France

Coordinates: 47.8202°N 1.7554°E

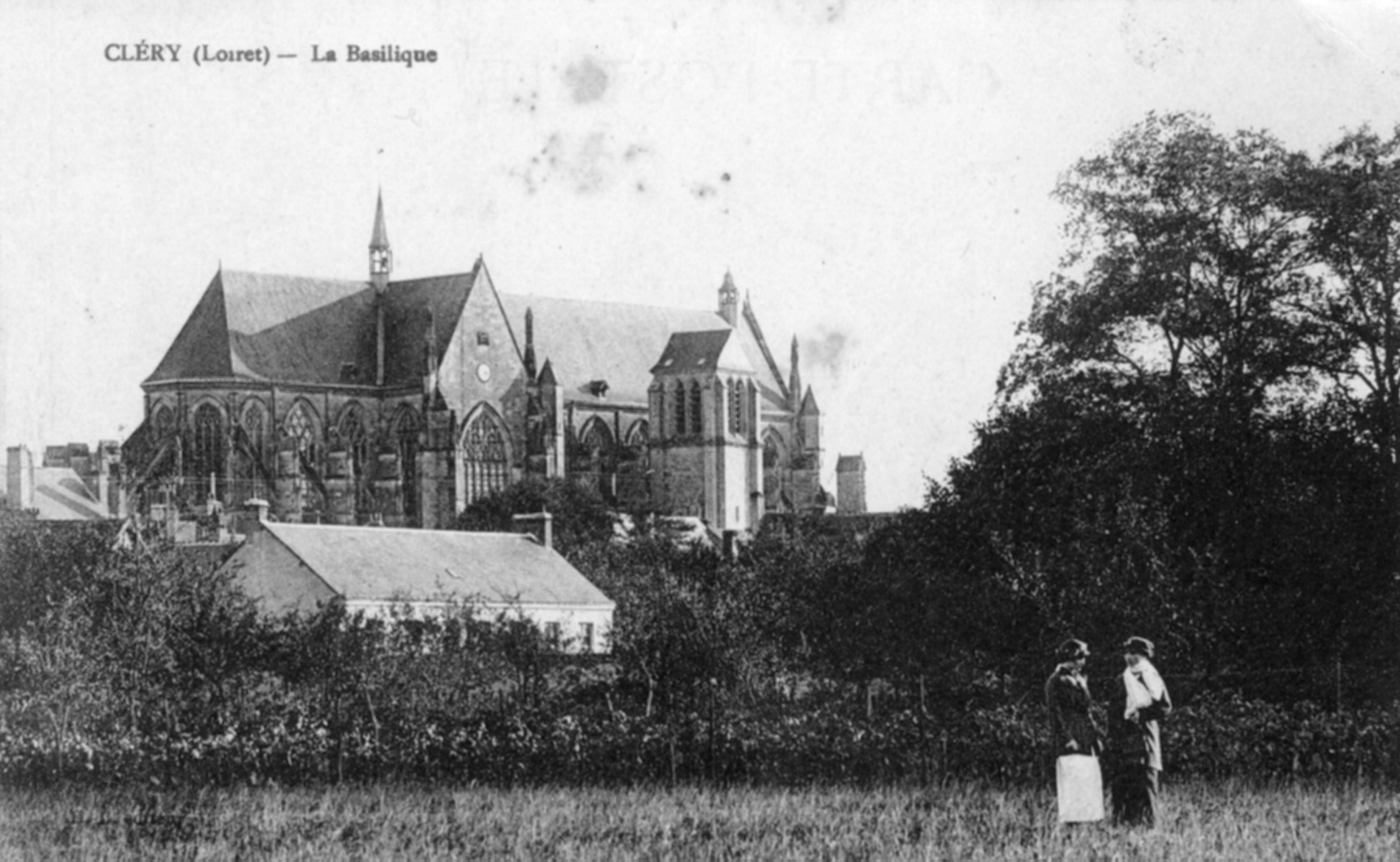
Basilique Notre-Dame de Cléry

The Basilica of Our Lady of Cléry (French: Basilique Notre-Dame de Cléry) is a mid-fifteenth century Catholic basilica, on the site of earlier church buildings, in Cléry-Saint-André, north-central France. It is located south of the Loire River, approximately 18 km (11 mi) south-west of Orléans.

== History ==
The importance of the church ground at Cléry began with the discovery in 1280 of a statue of the Virgin Mary with the Christ Child, to which miracle-working properties were quickly attributed. The statue was made of oak, slightly more than a meter in height. Louis Jarry believed that the statue was a reproduction of the 16th century, the original having been destroyed by the Huguenots. A small chapel was consecrated in order to further facilitate pilgrimage.

=== Philip IV and Cléry ===
Simon de Melun, seigneur de Cléry and Marshal of France, who patronized the church, wished to establish a collegiate church, which King Philip IV of France approved in November 1300. In his Last Will and Testament of 1302, Simon left sufficient funds to establish five prebends in the church, a will which was carried out by his widow and son. The act, and regulations governing the college, were confirmed by Bishop Bertrand de Saint-Denis of Orléans (1299–1307) in a charter of 1 December 1302.

In May 1306, King Philip IV added to the generosity of Simon de Melun by himself endowing five additional canons, thus making a Chapter of ten canons, one of whom was the Dean.

=== King Louis XI and Cléry ===
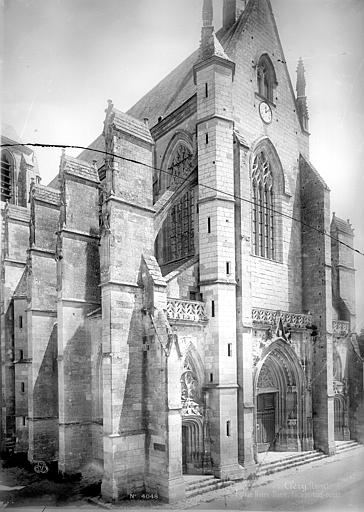
Basilique Notre-Dame - north-west façade

That church was mostly destroyed in 1428 during the Hundred Years' War by English troops under the Earl of Salisbury; only the original square bell tower remains. On 15 August 1443, during a battle against the English, at Dieppe, Louis XI, then dauphin of France, vowed to rebuild a church at Cléry if he was victorious in the battle. Following the French victory, reconstruction began under the direction of architects Pierre Chauvin and Pierre Lepage, but was not yet complete when Louis XI died in 1483.

By an ordonnance of 21 December 1457, King Louis confirmed all the privileges of Notre-Dame de Cléry and added others, including assigning it the same status as La Sainte-Chapelle in Paris, thereby making it a royal chapel. He also stated his wish to be buried there. In 1468, he sought and obtained from Pope Paul II a bull, dated 6 August 1468, by which the Church of Cléry and all of its personnel were removed from the jurisdiction of the bishops of Orléans and made directly subject to the Holy See (Papacy).

King Louis purchased the seigneury of Cléry in 1473, and, in November 1477, he elevated the seigneurie to the rank of barony and chatellerie; in June 1480, he gave it to the Chapter of Cléry as a gift.

Henry III of France made a pilgrimage to Notre-Dame de Cléry as Duke of Anjou in July 1573, in thanksgiving for not having been killed during the Siege of La Rochelle.

=== Revolution and restoration ===
The Civil Constitution of the Clergy (1790) abolished Chapters, canonries, prebends, and other offices both in cathedrals and in collegiate churches, including Notre-Dame de Cléry. To save the church, on 29 June 1791 the parish of Saint-Andre was relocated in the church of Cléry, but its curé, Abbe Bernard, who had been a canon of the Collegiate Church of Cléry, refused to swear the oath to the Civil Constitution required by the law of 26 December 1790. He therefore faced dismissal, and was replaced by a juring priest named Bellemont. In 1793, however, the church began to suffer demolition, and moveable artifacts of the fabric of the church were sold off. the graves in the church were desecrated, and the monument of Louis XI was carried off to Paris.

Following the Concordat of 1801 between Napoleon Bonaparte and Pope Pius VII, Abbe Bernard was reinstated as curé of Saint-André, where he served until his death on 10 April 1816. Between 1820 and 1824, plans were drawn up to rebuild the church, using the parts which still remained. On 12 June 1829, a new curé, Françoi-Georges Mercier was installed. Mercier had a stormy administration, and was happy to be transferred to the Deanery of Neuville. He was replaced on 12 February 1854 by Jacques-Auguste Brune, an Oblate (1854–1863), who was succeeded by Marc-Marie-Melchior de l'Hermite (1863). L'Hermite had the honor to participate in the crowning of the Virgin of Cléry, a privilege granted in April 1863 by Pope Pius IX at the request of Bishop Félix-Antoine-Philibert Dupanloup of Orléans (1849–1878), who was attempting to revive the pilgrimage and cult of Notre-Dame de Cléry.

The shrine was abandoned by 1850, and in 1854 it was taken over by the Oblate Missionaries as their base for preaching in the diocese of Orléans. They were withdrawn in 1865, for lack of support, and were replaced by Oratorians.

The title of Minor Basilica was obtained by Bishop Pierre-Hector Coullié (1878–1893) from Pope Leo XIII in 1892; the new basilica was inaugurated in May 1894.

== Bibliography ==
- Georges-Zimmermann, Patrice (2015). Les sépultures prestigieuses de l'église Notre-Dame de Cléry-Saint-André (Loiret): étude pluridisciplinaire du caveau de Louis XI. L'Harmattan. p. 36.
- Jarry, Louis (1899). Histoire de Cléry et de l'église collégiale et chapelle royale de Notre-Dame de Cléry. (in French) Orléans: H. Herluison, 1899.
- Millet, Lucien (1926). Notre-Dame de Cléry. (in French). Second edition. Paris: Letouzey 1926.
