= Philip Berruyer =

French bishop and saint

Philip Berruyer (died 1260 of natural causes) was bishop of Orléans in 1234, and then archbishop of Bourges from 1236 until his death. He was responsible for overseeing much of the building work on Bourges Cathedral, though the identity of the architect or chief mason is unknown.

William of Bourges was his uncle. He is a Catholic saint, feast day 9 January, beatified in the thirteenth century.
