= Saint-Félix, Haute-Savoie =

Saint-Félix
- Commune
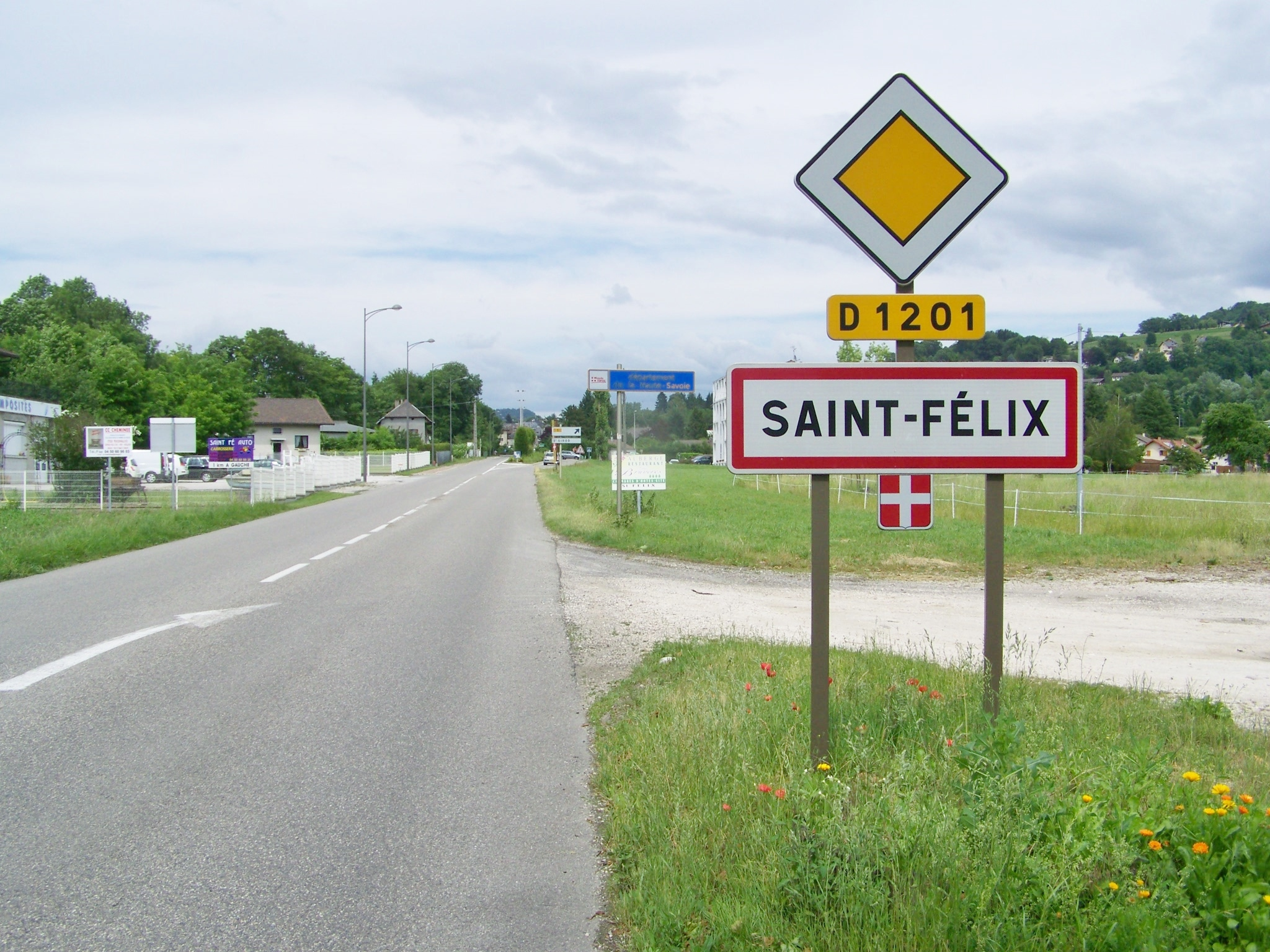
- Entering into St-Félix and the Haute-Savoie department.
- Location of Saint-Félix
- Location within France Location within Auvergne-Rhône-Alpes
- Coordinates: 45°48′06″N 5°58′23″E
- Country: France
- Region: Auvergne-Rhône-Alpes
- Department: Haute-Savoie
- Arrondissement: Annecy
- Canton: Rumilly
- Intercommunality: CA Grand Annecy

Government
  - Mayor (2020–2026): Alain Bauquis
- Area^{1}: 6.6 km^{2} (2.5 sq mi)
- Highest elevation: 580 m (1,900 ft)
- Lowest elevation: 352 m (1,155 ft)
- Population (2023): 2,439
  - Density: 370/km^{2} (960/sq mi)
- Time zone: UTC+01:00 (CET)
  - Summer (DST): UTC+02:00 (CEST)
- INSEE/Postal code: 74233 /74540
- ^{1} French Land Register data, which excludes lakes, ponds, glaciers > 1 km^{2} (0.386 sq mi or 247 acres) and river estuaries.

Saint-Félix (French pronunciation: [sɛ̃ feliks]; Franco-Provençal: San-Fli or Sant-Felix) is a commune in the Haute-Savoie department of Auvergne-Rhône-Alpes region, south-eastern France.

== Population ==
Historical population
Year	Pop.	±% p.a.
1968	1,080	—
1975	1,190	+1.40%
1982	1,224	+0.40%
1990	1,356	+1.29%
1999	1,617	+1.98%
2007	2,023	+2.84%
2012	2,252	+2.17%
2017	2,421	+1.46%
2023	2,439	+0.12%
Source: INSEE

== See also ==
- Communes of the Haute-Savoie department
