= Aignan of Orleans =

Saint Aignan (Anianus)
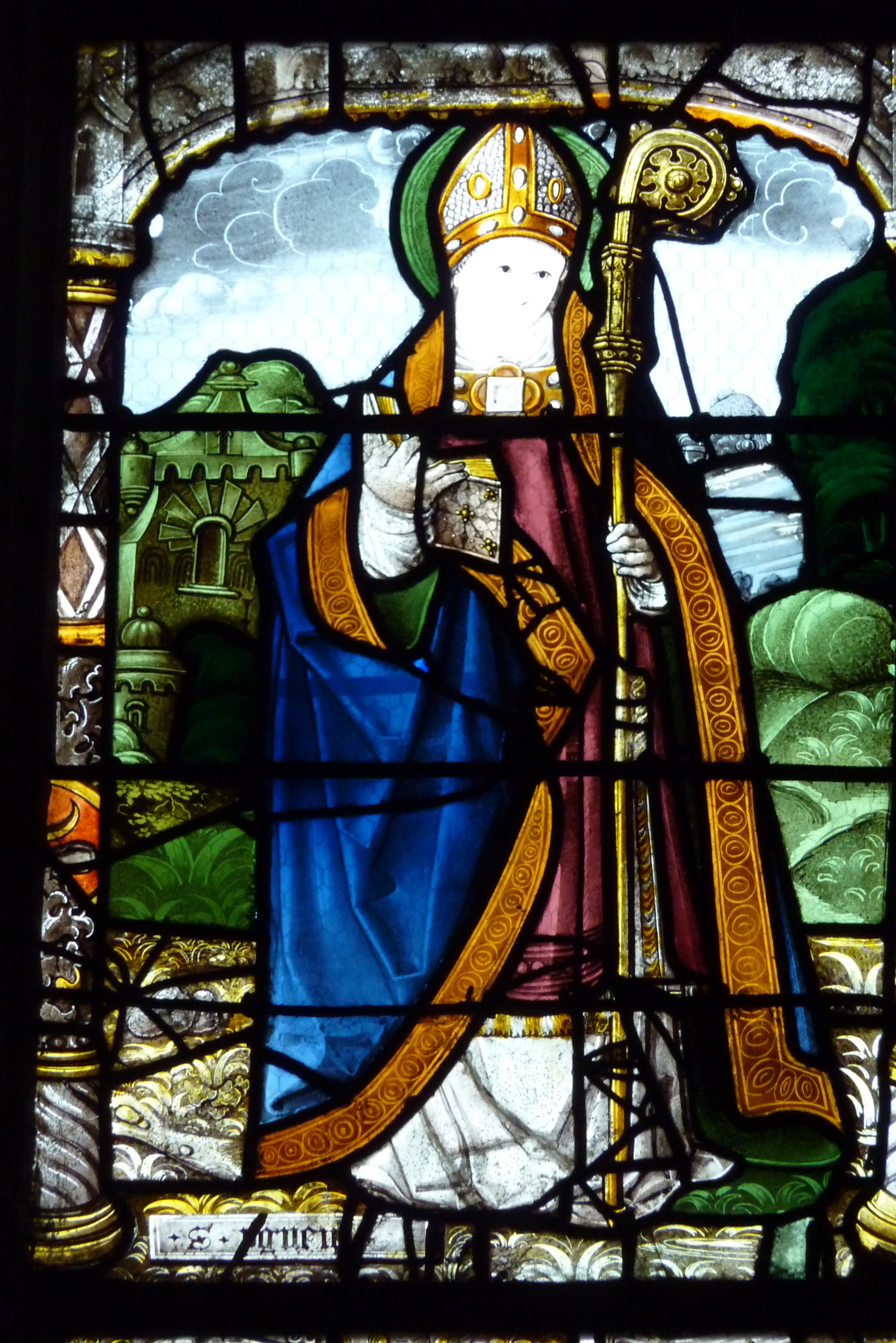
- Saint Aignan (stained-glass window in the church of Saint-Aignan, Chartres)

Bishop of Orléans
- Born: c. 358; Vienne, Isère
- Died: 453; Orléans, France
- Venerated in: Eastern Orthodox Church; Roman Catholic Church
- Canonized: pre-congregation
- Major shrine: Church of Saint Aignan, Orléans
- Feast: 17 November
- Attributes: bishop praying on the top of the walls of Orléans
- Patronage: city and diocese of Orléans

Aignan or Agnan (Latin: Anianus) (358–453), seventh Bishop of Orléans, France, assisted Roman general Flavius Aetius in the defense of the city against Attila the Hun in 451. He is known as Saint Aignan.

His feast day is the 17th of November.

== Life ==
Aignan of Orléans (or Anianus) was born about 358 in Vienne in the Dauphiné to a family probably of Roman origin, who had fled the control of the Arian Goths in their homeland of Hungary. His brother Leonianus became an abbot, and is commemorated in the Gallican martyrology on 16 November.

As a young man, he retired to a hermitage he had built for himself near that city, to live a life of prayer and penance. He then went to Orléans to study under by Bishop Euvertius. Under the direction of Euvertius, he prepared for the priesthood, and after ordination was appointed abbot of the monastery of Saint Laurence des Orgeries outside the city walls. Later he was promoted to coadjutor Bishop of Orléans.

Upon the death of Euvertius, Aignan became bishop of Orléans. It was customary on the installation of the bishop for the city to release prisoners. Agrippinus, the governor of the city, refused to release them despite Bishop Aignan's request; but falling ill, immediately set them at liberty.

Aignan is credited with doing much to save his city from Attila's hordes, who had avoided Paris. Though advanced in age, he helped the populace prepare to defend themselves and traveled to Arles to ask the Roman general Aetius to intervene. Aignan died about 453 at the age of ninety-five. His remains were buried at first in the church of the monastery of Saint Laurence, of which he had been abbot, but were later moved to the church of the monastery of Saint-Pierre-aux-Bœufs, which was afterwards renamed as a token of veneration as the church, and afterwards abbey, of Saint Aignan. Some of his relics were burned by the Huguenots in 1562; the surviving parts are in a carved wooden shrine in the church of Saint Aignan.

== Siege of Orléans ==
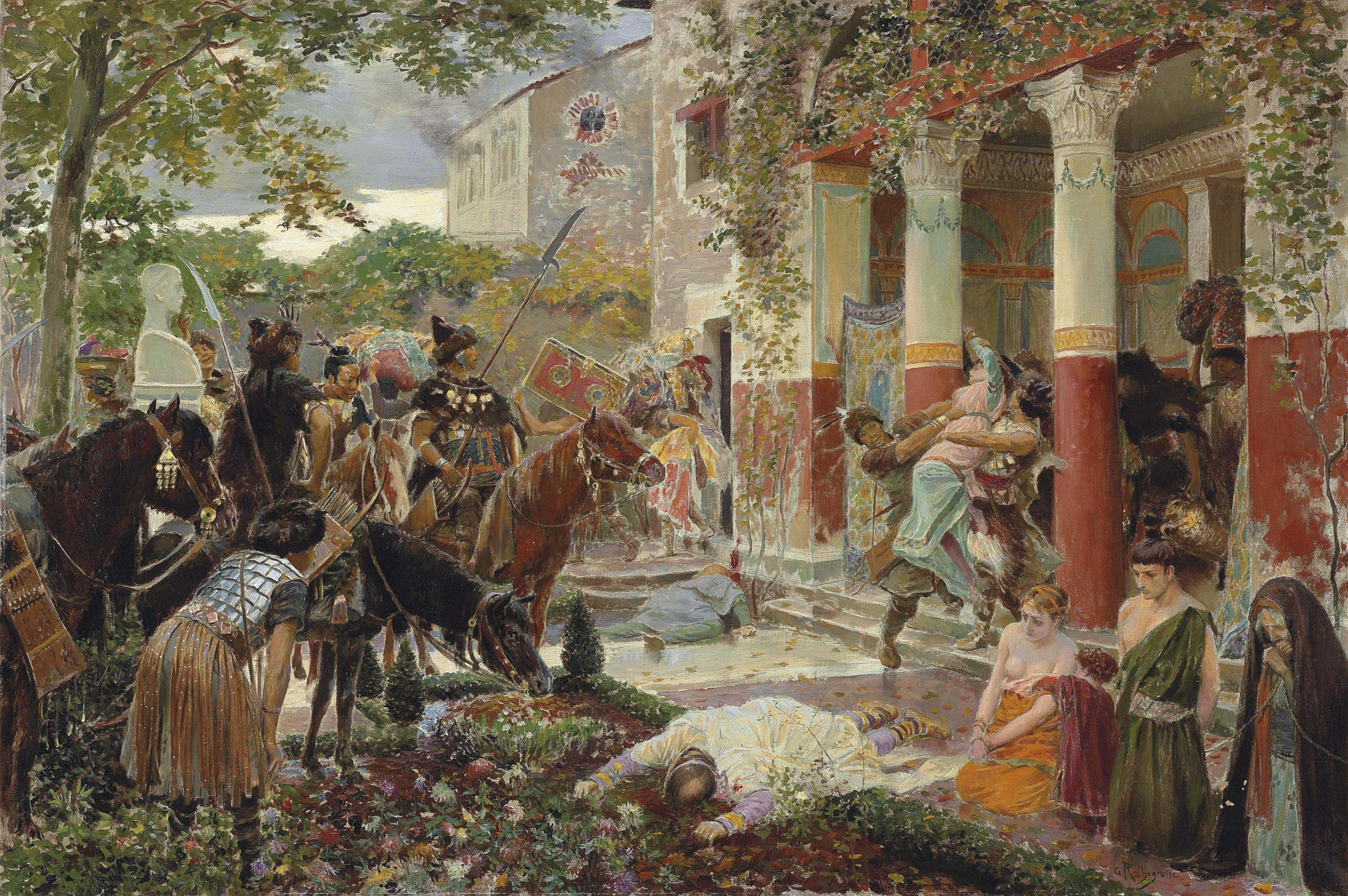
Roman villa in Gaul sacked by the hordes of Attila the Hun (Huns by Rochegrosse)

Attila crossed the Rhine early in 451 with his followers and a large number of allies, sacking Divodurum (now Metz) on 7 April. His path can be traced through the hagiographies written to commemorate various bishops: Nicasius of Rheims was slaughtered before the altar of his church in Reims; Servatius of Tongeren is alleged to have saved Tongeren with his prayers, as Genevieve is to have saved Paris. Lupus, bishop of Troyes, is also credited with saving his city by meeting Attila in person.

Several ancient sources, in particular Sidonius Apollinaris and the Vita Aniani describe him as one of the main architects of the defense of Aurelianum (the former name of Orléans) against the Hun king Attila in 451 with the help of Ætius, a Roman general, whom he had first convinced to join the city.

Attila's army had reached Aurelianum (modern Orleans, France) before June. This siege is confirmed by the account of the Vita S. Aniani and in the later account of Gregory of Tours. However, the inhabitants of Aurelianum shut their gates against the advancing invaders, and Attila began to besiege the city. After four days of heavy rain, Attila began his final assault on 14 June, which was broken due to the approach of the Roman coalition.

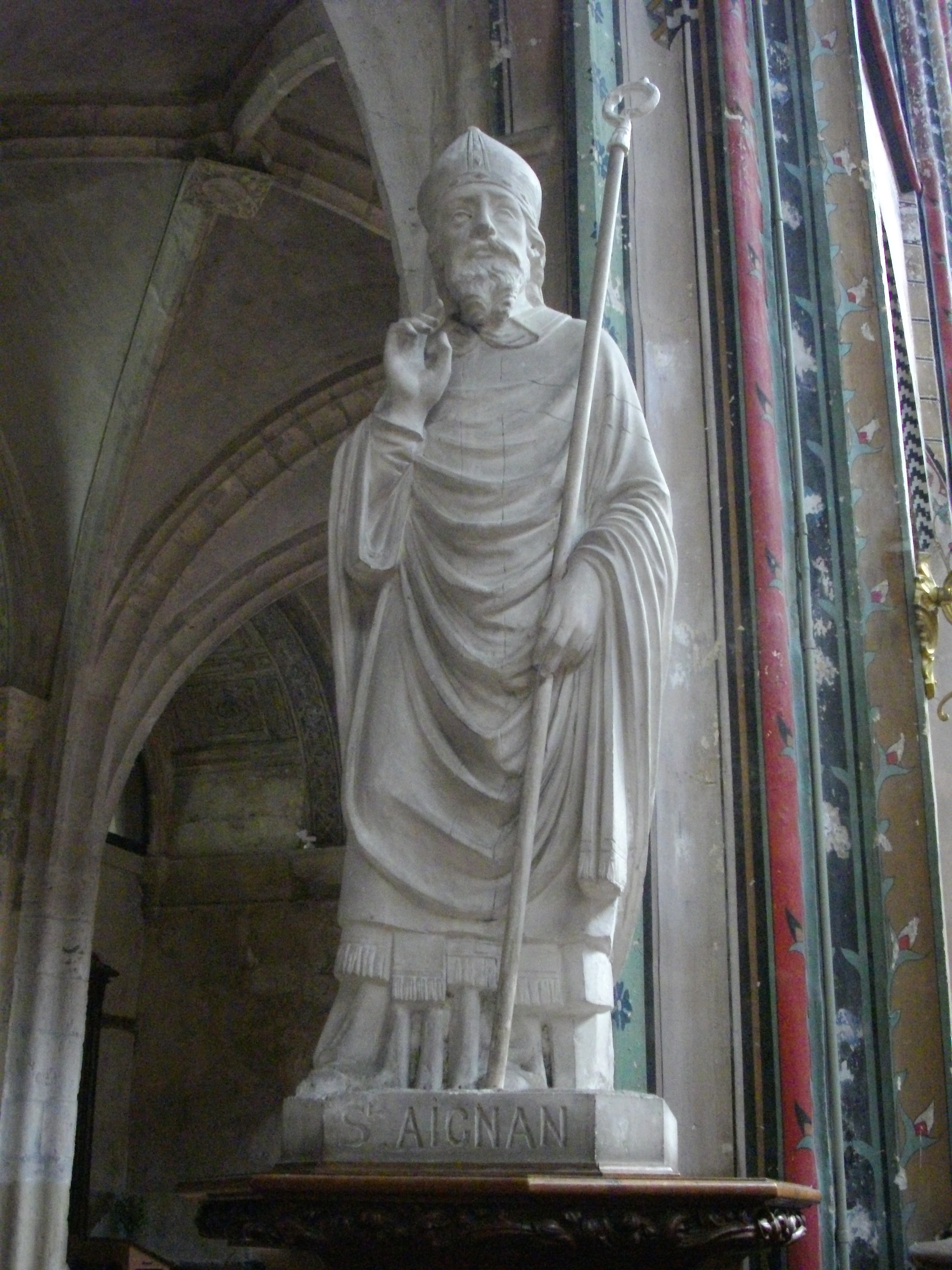
Church of Saint-Aignan, Chartres

A text, exhibited in the collegiate church of Saint-Aignan in Orléans, based on sources from the 5th and 6th centuries states that faced with the lack of civil authorities, the old bishop Aignan organized the defense. During the siege he invited the inhabitants to pray to God to give them the strength to resist. At the same time, he left for Arles where the Roman patrician Ætius lived in order to convince him to intervene with his legions. While the inhabitants were waiting to be massacred, the Roman vanguard arrived, and the Huns withdrew. It was the beginning of their retreat. They were pursued and defeated near Troyes at the Battle of the Catalaunian Plains.

Every day, Aignan climbed to the top of a tower to scan the horizon and warn of a possible return of the Huns.

== Legend ==
Saint Aignan contributed through prayer and his skill as a negotiator to save the city of Orléans, in 451, from total destruction by the Huns (who had just destroyed Divodurum, with its inhabitants). A local legend tells that, during the siege of the city of Orléans by the Huns, the relief troops of the Roman general Ætius were late in arriving. Saint Aignan invoked heaven by throwing a handful of sand from the Loire from the top of the ramparts... Each grain turned into a wasp and a cloud of stings managed to put the barbarians to flight. Then Attila decided not to attack the city and to bypass it.

== Veneration ==
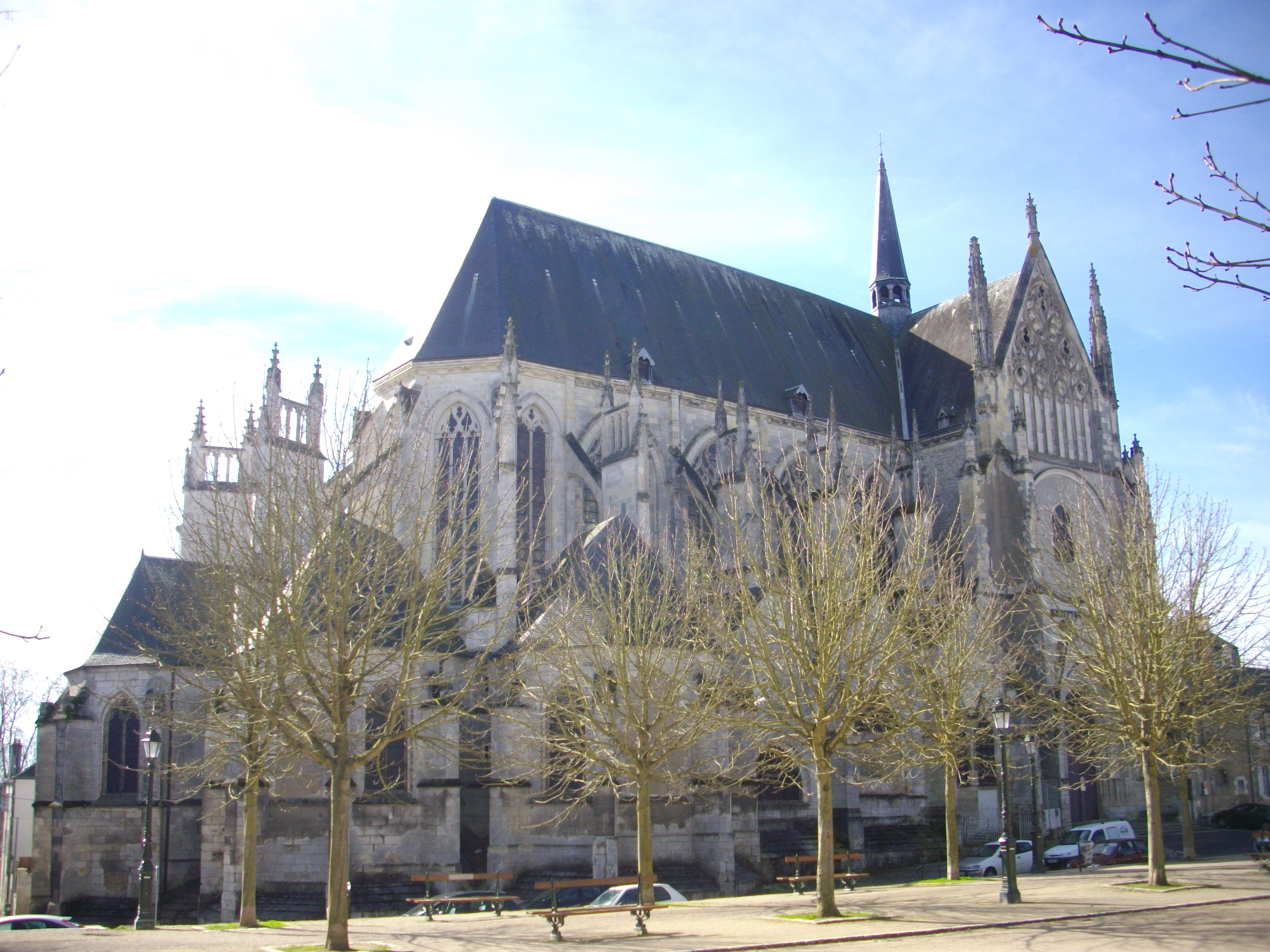
église Saint-Aignan, Orléans

According to Gregory of Tours, there was a basilica with a shrine to Anianus sometime before 587. Gregory calls it the basilica sancti Aniani. A monastery dedicated to Anianus existed in the first half of the 7th century. According to the Chronicle of Fredegar, written in the middle of the century, the shrine of Anianus was comparable in importance to that of Saint Martin of Tours.

In the 11th century, King Robert II of France decided to build an abbey and an abbey church, including a crypt containing the relics of Saint Aignan. This crypt, reworked in the 14th century, is one of the largest in France, but the sculpted capitals from the 11th century remain. In the 1070s, an anonymous monk of Saint-Aignan composed the Miracula sancti Aniani, a collection of stories of miracles performed by Anianus.

Aignan is honoured in the Roman Martyrology, and the Paris Breviary. He is one of the patron saints of the city of Orléans, somewhat supplanted almost a thousand years later and in rather similar circumstances, by Joan of Arc. Saint Aignan will be chosen as protector of the city and the diocese of Orleans, in memory of his courage and his trust in God. Nowadays, many places in France bear his name, because he was considered a savior at the time.

=== Iconography ===
Saint Aignan is represented in art as praying on the top of the walls of Orléans.

== Customs ==
In the 19th and 20th centuries, the Saint Aignan Fair (17 November), also known as the Pig Fair, was held on the square still known as the Saint Aignan cloister, located alongside the current Saint Aignan collegiate church. In reality, this event dates back several centuries (it already existed in the 18th century) and was an important fair and festival. The tradition is to give children a gingerbread pig on which their name is written with a sugar line. It was coupled with the Tree Fair, which still exists.

== Legacy ==
A Saint-Aignan chapel was built in the 12th century, in 1116, on the Île de la Cité in Paris, close to Notre-Dame Cathedral. This construction is due to Étienne de Garlande, dean of the chapter of the collegiate church of Saint-Aignan in Orléans and chancellor of Louis VI the Fat. The remains of this site can still be seen in the walls of 19 rue des Ursins.

He also has a church named after him in Saint-Agnan in Moselle: the church of Saint-Agnan. A church of Saint-Aignan in Ruffey-sur-Seille (Jura), where he is represented by three large paintings (17th and 19th century). Another church of Saint-Aignan exists in the Atlantic Pyrenees at Ramous, as well as at Ivoy-le-Pré dating from the 13th century. A church of Saint-Aignan, built on an ancient spring, also exists in Épeigné-les-Bois (Indre-et-Loire). The church of the commune of Lacquy (Landes) is dedicated to Saint Aignan since the 10th century. The painter Ulpiano Checa y Sanz realized in 1900 a fresco representing Saint Aignan.

The parish church of Saint Aignan in Tonnerre, Yonne, given by Count Guillaume de Nevers II in 1089 to the young abbey of Molesme, is considered to be the mother church of the future parishes of the city (Saint-Pierre 1148 and Notre-Dame 1164).
