= Robert Picard de La Vacquerie =

French religious leader (1893–1969)

His Excellency, The Most Reverend Robert Picard de La Vacquerie
- Bishop of Orléans
- Church: Catholic Church
- Diocese: Diocese of Orléans
- In office: August 27, 1951 – May 23, 1963
- Other post(s): Titular Archbishop of Amida (1963–1969)
- Previous post(s): Titular Bishop of Doara (1946–1951)

Orders
- Ordination: June 29, 1921
- Consecration: October 9, 1946 by Emmanuel Célestin Suhard

Personal details
- Born: July 22, 1893; Charenton-le-Pont, France
- Died: March 17, 1969 (aged 75); Orléans, France

Robert Picard de La Vacquerie (July 22, 1893 – March 17, 1969) was a French Catholic prelate who was the Bishop of Orléans from 1951 to 1963.

== Biography ==
Robert Picard de La Vacquerie was ordained a priest on June 29, 1921, and was first incardinated in the Archdiocese of Paris. In 1924, he was inducted into the Society of the History of Paris and the Île-de-France (French: Société de l'histoire de Paris et de l'Île-de-France).

He was appointed the Titular Bishop of Doara on July 16, 1946, and was consecrated a bishop on October 9, 1946, with Cardinal Emmanuel Célestin Suhard acting as the principal consecrator. He then became the chaplain to the troops of the French-occupied zone of Germany and Austria between 1946 and 1951.

On August 27, 1951, he was named Bishop of Orléans. From 1952 to 1960, he was the bishop protector of the French Sports Federation (French: Fédération sportive de France) "responsible for monitoring the activities [of the FSF] and encouraging the FSF apostolate."

He was a Conciliar Father at the first session of the Second Vatican Council, from October 11 to December 8, 1962.

Picard La Vacquerie resigned as Bishop of Orléans on May 23, 1963, and was appointed the Titular Archbishop of Amida on the same day.

He died on March 17, 1969, in Orléans, France, at the age of 75.

Catholic Church titles
Preceded by Francisco Maria Campos y Angeles	— TITULAR — Bishop of Doara; 1946–1951	Succeeded by Aleksander Moscicki
Preceded by Jules-Marie-Victor Courcoux	Bishop of Orléans; 1951–1963	Succeeded by Guy Riobé
Preceded by Gastone Mojaisky Perrelli	— TITULAR — Archbishop of Amida; 1963–1969	Succeeded by Joseph Cheikho
