= Diocese of Orléans =

Catholic diocese in France

Coordinates: 47°53′59″N 1°54′58″E

Diocese of Orléans Dioecesis Aurelianensis Diocèse d'Orléans

Catholic
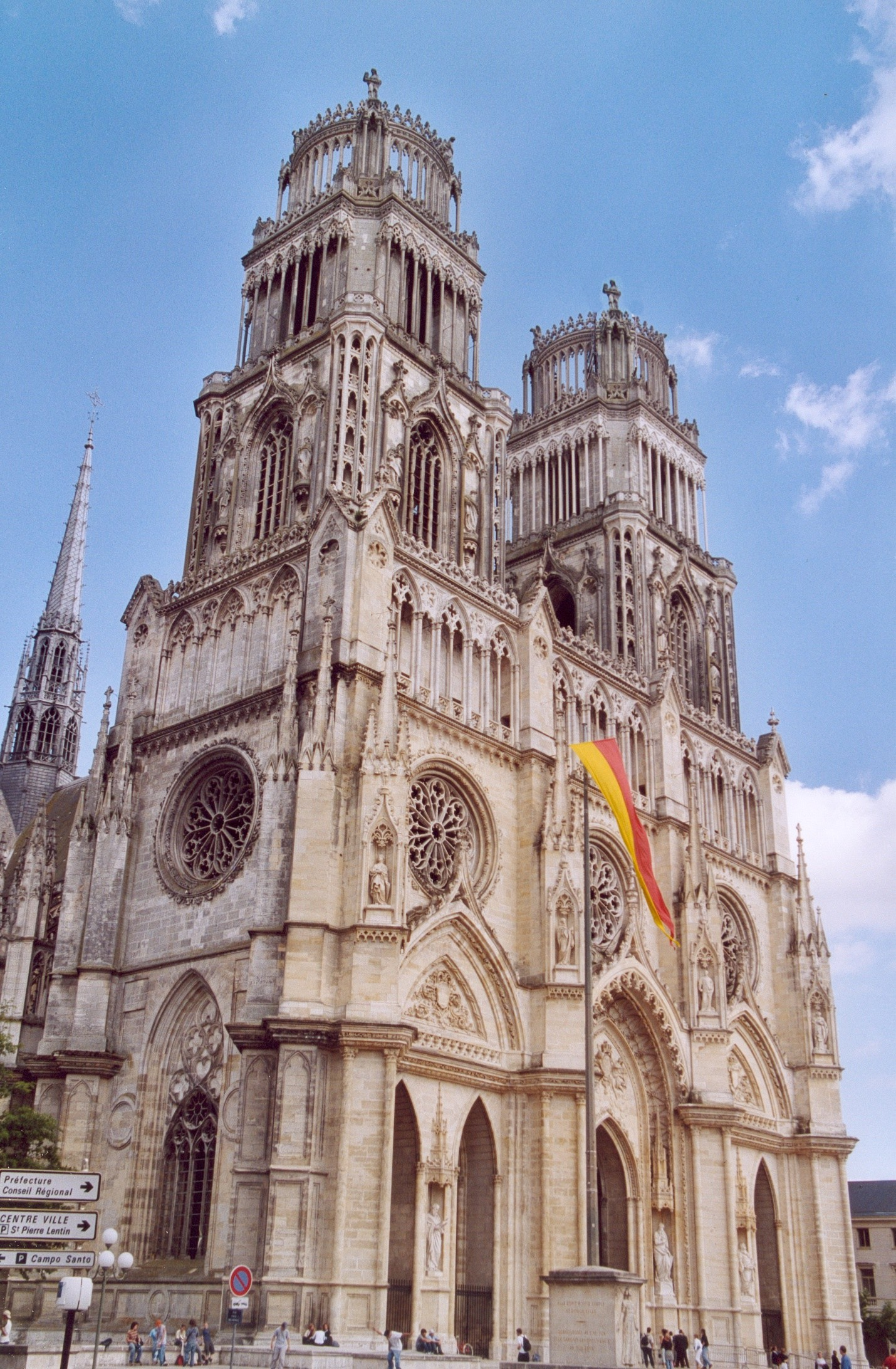
- Orléans Cathedral

Location
- Country: France
- Territory: Loiret
- Ecclesiastical province: Tours
- Metropolitan: Archdiocese of Tours

Statistics
- Area: 6,811 km^{2} (2,630 sq mi)
- Population: Total; Catholics: (as of 2023); 682,000 (est.) ▲; 450,320 (est.) ▲
- Parishes: 261 ▼

Information
- Denomination: Catholic
- Sui iuris church: Latin Church
- Rite: Roman Rite
- Established: 4th Century (?)
- Cathedral: Cathedral Basilica of the Holy Cross in Orléans
- Patron saint: Saint Aignan
- Secular priests: 72 (Diocesan) ▼21 (Religious Orders) ▼35 Permanent Deacons ▲

Current leadership
- Pope: Leo XIV
- Bishop: Jacques André Blaquart
- Metropolitan Archbishop: Vincent Jordy

Map

Website
- catholique-orleans.cef.fr

The Diocese of Orléans (Latin: Dioecesis Aurelianensis; French: Diocèse d'Orléans) is a Latin Church diocese of the Catholic Church in France. The diocese currently corresponds to the Départment of Loiret. The city is 133 kilometers (83 miles) south-southwest of Paris.

The diocese has experienced a number of transfers among different metropolitans. In 1622, the diocese was suffragan of the Archdiocese of Paris; previously the diocese had been a suffragan of the Archdiocese of Sens. From 1966 until 2001 it was under the jurisdiction of the Archdiocese of Bourges, but since the provisional reorganisation of French ecclesiastical provinces, it is now subject to the Archdiocese of Tours.

After the Revolution it was re-established by the Concordat of 1802. It then included the Departments of Loiret and Loir et Cher, but in 1822 Loir et Cher was moved to the new Diocese of Blois.

The current bishop is Jacques André Blaquart, who was appointed in 2010. In 2021, in the Diocese of Orleans, there was one priest for every 4,306 Catholics.

== Jurisdiction ==
The present Diocese of Orléans differs considerably from that of the old regime; it has lost the arrondissement of Romorantin which has passed to the Diocese of Blois and the canton of Janville, now in the Diocese of Chartres. It includes the arrondissement of Montargis, formerly subject to the Archdiocese of Sens, the arrondissement of Gien, once in the Burgundian Diocese of Auxerre, and the canton of Châtillon sur Loire, once belonging to the Archdiocese of Bourges.

== History ==
=== Foundation myth ===
To Gerbert, Abbot of St. Pierre le Vif at Sens (1046–79), is due a detailed narrative according to which Saint Savinianus and Saint Potentianus were sent to Sens by St. Peter with St. Altinus; the latter, it was said, came to Orléans as its first bishop. Before the ninth century there is no historical trace in the Diocese of Sens of this Apostolic mission of St. Altinus, nor in the Diocese of Orléans before the end of the fifteenth. Christianity was an illegal cult in Roman law until the Edict of Milan.

Diclopitus is the first authentic bishop; he figures among the bishops of Gaul who (about 344) ratified the absolution of St. Athanasius. Other bishops of the early period are: St. Euvertius (who features in the Calendar of the Book of Common Prayer), about 355 to 385, according to M. Cuissard; Anianus (385–453), who invoked the aid of the "patrician" Ætius against the invasion of Attila, and forced the Huns to raise the siege of Orléans [see Gregory of Tours, The History of the Franks II.6-7]; St. Prosper (453–63); St. Monitor (about 472); St. Flou (Flosculus), died in 490; St. Eucherius (717-43), native of Orléans and a monk of Jumièges, who protested against the depredations of Waifre, a companion of Charles Martel, and was first exiled by this prince to Cologne, then to Liège, and died at the monastery of St. Trond.

==== Cathedral ====
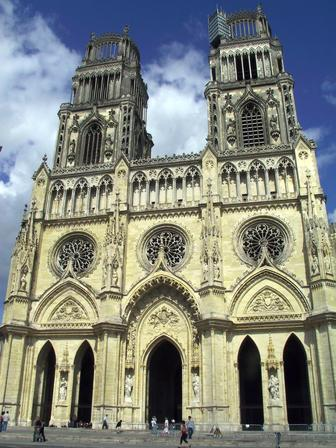
Orléans Cathedral, dedicated to the Holy Cross

The cathedral of Sainte Croix, perhaps built and consecrated by Bishop Euvertius in the fourth century, was destroyed by fire in 999, and rebuilt between 1278 and 1329; the Protestants pillaged and destroyed it during the Wars of Religion, from 1562 to 1567; the Bourbon kings restored the cathedral in the 17th century.

In 816, the Emperor Louis the Pious held a council at Aix, at which it was ordered that Canons and Canonesses live together according to a set of rules (canons, regulae), expressed in great detail. In the Roman synod of Pope Eugene II of November 826, it was ordered that Canons live together in a cloister next to the church. In 876, the Council of Pavia decreed in Canon X that the bishops should enclose the Canons: uti episcopi in civitatibus suis proximum ecclesiae claustrum instituant, in quo ipsi cum clero secundum canonicam regulam Deo militent, et sacerdotes suos ad hoc constringant, ut ecclesiam non relinquant et alibi habitare praesumant. The term "canon" (canonicatus) first appears at Orléans next to the signatures of eight persons in a charter of Bishop Isambard in 1038.

The cathedral of Sainte-Croix was served and administered by the Chapter, which was composed of twelve dignities (including the Dean, the Subdean, the Cantor, the five Archdeacons, the Scholasticus, the Subcantor, the Penitentiary, and the Archpriest) and forty six-canons (one of whom was the Theologus). The earliest known dean, Humbert, in 974, bears the old title "abbot", but in 1027, Erfred signs himself decanus, and the title abbot disappears.

=== Plagues in Orléans ===
It is recorded that in the early Middle Ages, there were plagues in 590. 874, and 906, and a plague of locusts in 1043. Leprosy was alreeady known in Orléans by 549, when the Fifth Council of Orléans ordered the bishops to take care of the sufferers. Nothing is known about the Black Death in Orléans in 1348–1349; the record of morbidity and mortality kept by the Hotel-Dieu is either missing or was never written. Records do survive testifying to its bloody reappearance in 1414, 1430, 1458 and 1482–1483. In 1430, the plague carried off the hospital's chaplain, and the survivors were not able to find a replacement. In the 16th century, there were twenty-two outbreaks of the plague; in 1529, 2383 burials were reported; in 1530, 2736; in 1531, 3080; in 1532, 2675; in 1533, 2752 burials. In 1562, from August to November, according to a report of Theodore de Béze, the Protestant leader, more than 10,000 persons died in Orléans.

=== Abbey of Micy ===
After his victory over the Alamanni, the Frankish king Clovis was bent on the sack of Verdun, but the archpriest there obtained mercy for his fellow-citizens. To St. Euspicius and his nephew St. Mesmin (Maximinus), Clovis also gave the domain of Micy, near Orléans at the confluence of the Loire and the Loiret, for a monastery (508). When Euspicius died, the said St. Maximinus became abbot, and during his rule the religious life flourished there notably. The monks of Micy contributed much to the civilization of the Orléans region; they cleared and drained the lands and taught the semi-barbarous inhabitants the worth and dignity of agricultural work. Early in the eighth century, Theodulfus restored the Abbey of Micy and at his request St. Benedict of Aniane sent fourteen monks and visited the abbey himself.

From Micy monastic life spread within and around the diocese. St. Liphardus and St. Urbicius founded the Abbey of Meung-sur-Loire; St. Lyé (Lætus) died a recluse in the forest of Orléans; Viator of Orleans in Sologne; St. Doulchard in the forest of Ambly near Bourges. Leonard of Noblac introduced the monastic life into the territory of Limoges; St. Almir, St. Ulphacius, and St. Bomer in the vicinity of Montmirail; St. Calais (died before 536) and St. Leonard of Vendœuvre (died about 570) in the valley of the Sarthe; St. Fraimbault, and the aforesaid St. Bomer (died about 560) in the Passais near Laval; St. Leonard of Dunois; St. Alva and St. Ernier in Perche; St. Laumer (died about 590) became Abbot of Corbion. St. Lubin (Leobinus), a monk of Micy, became Bishop of Chartres from 544 to 56. Finally Agilus, Viscount of Orléans (died after 587), was also a protector of Micy.

The last abbot of Micy, Chapt de Rastignac, was one of the victims of the 1792 "September Massacres", at Paris, in the prison of L'Abbaye.

=== Theodulf ===
Charlemagne had the church of St. Aignan rebuilt, and reconstructed the monastery of St. Pierre le Puellier.

It is not known when Bishop Theodulfus began to govern, but it is certain that he was already bishop in 798, when Charlemagne sent him into Narbonne and Provence as missus dominicus. Under king Louis le Débonnaire he was accused of aiding the rebellious King of Italy, was deposed and imprisoned four years in a monastery at Angers, but was released when Louis came to Angers in 821, reportedly after hearing Theodulfus sing "All Glory, Laud and Honour." The "Capitularies" which Theodulfus addressed to the clergy of Orléans are considered a most important monument of Catholic tradition on the duties of priests and the faithful. His Ritual, his Penitential, his treatise on baptism, confirmation and the Eucharist, his edition of the Bible, a work of fine penmanship preserved in the Puy cathedral, reveal him as one of the foremost men of his time. His fame rests chiefly on his devotion to the spread of learning. The Abbey of Ferrières was then becoming under Alcuin a centre of learning. Theodulfus opened the Abbey of Fleury to the young noblemen sent thither by Charlemagne, invited the clergy to establish free schools in the country districts, and quoted for them, "These that are learned shall shine as the brightness of the firmament: and they that instruct many to justice, as stars to all eternity" (Dan., xii 3). One monument of his time still survives in the diocese, the apse of the church of Germigny-des-Prés modelled after the imperial chapel, and yet retaining its unique mosaic decoration.

In October 856, the Northmen invaded and surrounded Orléans, which was able to avoid pillage and burning by the payment of a large sum of money. The Northmen turned their attention instead on the abbey of Saint-Micy, which was entirely destroyed. They burned Paris in 857, and returned to Orléans in 865, when they destroyed part of the fortifications, pillaged the city, and put it to the torch. The churches went up in flames, except for the cathedral. They then turned on the abbey of Saint-Benedict in Fleury, which they found entirely evacuated; nonetheless, they set fire to all the buildings.

In the cathedral of Orléans on 31 December 987, Hugh Capet had his son Robert (born at Orléans) crowned king.

Pope Innocent II and Bernard of Clairvaux visited Fleury and Orléans in 1130.

=== Education ===
Already by the 12th century, the School of Grammar and Rhetoric at Orléans was noted for its quality. In the medieval French poem, "The Battle of the Seven Arts," rhetoric is personified as the Lady of Orléans. There were also teachers of law in the city. Orleans became an unexpected beneficiary of a decree issued by Pope Honorius III on 16 November 1219, prohibiting the teaching and learning of civil law at the University of Paris, on pain of excommunication. Numbeers of students and professors migrated to Orleans. Scholarship in Orléans received another unintended benefit when the Masters of the University of Paris, in opposition to the royal court, the papal legate, and the bishop and clergy of Paris, suspended teaching and closed the university in 1229. Some teachers withdrew to England, to Oxford or Cambridge; others, particularly those in the legal facuolty, to French schools, particularly Orléans and Angers. On 17 January 1235, Pope Gregory IX, in response to an inquiry from the bishop of Orléans, ruled that Honorius III's prohibitions extended only to Paris, and that the bishop was free to exercise his powers and allow the law to be taught and studied in his jurisdiction.

On 27 January 1306, in the bull "Dum Perspicaciter", Pope Clement V (Bertrand de Got, who had been a student at Orléans) raised the studium of Orléans to the status of a university, with the same privileges as enjoyed by the University of Toulouse. The powers over the educational establishment which had once belonged to the Scholasticus of the cathedral Chapter were transferred to the bishop and the Masters. The usual disorders between town and gown reached such an extent that Philip IV of France intervened in 1312, in favor of the magistrates of the city, and suppressed both the university and the "nations" of the students. Abused by the domination of the magistrates, the university engaged in a secession of its own, and withdrew to Nevers in 1316. In 1320, after negotiations with both Pope John XXII and King Philip V of France, the masters and students, with most of their privilege restored, returned to Orléans. By 1337, the university had ten regent professors, presided over by a rector; the scholars were organized into ten "nations": France, Normandy, Champagne, Burgundy, Bourbon, Aquitaine, Picardy, Touraine, Scotland, and Germany.

=== Later medieval history ===
The people of Orléans were so impressed by the preaching of the Breton Robert of Arbrissel in 1113 that he was invited by Bishop Jean (II) to found the monastery of La Madeleine for women, which he re-visited in 1117 in the company of Abbot Bernard of Thiron.

The charitable deeds of Louis IX of France at Puiseaux, Châteauneuf-sur-Loire, and Orléans, where he was present at the translation of the relics of St. Aignan (26 October 1259), and where he frequently went to care for the poor of the Hôtel Dieu, are well known. Pierre de Beaufort, Archdeacon of Sully and canon of Orléans, was, as Gregory XI (1371–8), the most recent French pope; he created Cardinal Jean de la Tour d'Auvergne, Abbot of St. Benoît-sur Loire.

Bishop Milo de Chailli died at the papal court in Avignon on 15 March 1321. Pope John XXII took advantage of the fact by exercising a special reservation on the episcopal see of Orléans, and, on 3 April 1321, appointed Roger de Fort, Dean of Bourges, as the new bishop. He was the nephew of Guillaume de Laudun, lector in the Roman Curia, who became archbishop of Vienne on 27 February 1321, and then archbishop of Toulouse in 1327. Bishop Roger de Fort was transferred to the diocese of Limoges by Pope John XXII on 23 December 1327. The pope took the opportunity to appoint a bishop of Orléans a second time, the Benedictine Abbot Jean of Saint-Médard in Soissons.

In 1411, the archbishop of Sens Jean de Montaigu held a synod of the bishops of his province in Orléans to attempt to deal with the conflict between Charles, Duke of Orléans, and Philip the Good, Duke of Burgundy, both of whom had previously been excommunicated. The sentence against the duke of Burgundy was confirmed.

In 1440, the Chapter of Sainte-Croix was in such financial straits that they had to sell the crozier and mitre of Bishop Guy de Prunelé (1394–1425) to the Chapter of Saint-Martin of Tours.

==== Jeanne d'Arc ====
France was saved from English domination through the deliverance of Orléans by Joan of Arc (8 May 1429). She was executed as a relapsed heretic on 30 May 1431. On 21 July 1455, her rehabilitation was publicly proclaimed at Orléans in a solemn procession, and her mother, Isabel Romée, who died in November 1458, lived to see a monument erected in honour of her daughter, at Tournelles, near the Orléans bridge. The monument, destroyed by the Huguenots in 1567, was set up again in 1569, when the Catholics were once more masters of the city. Until 1792, and again from 1802 to 1830, and again from 1842 to the present day, a religious festival in honour of Joan d'Arc is celebrated annually on 8 May at Orléans.

==== Reformation and Countereformation ====
After her separation from Louis XII (1498), Joan of France, Duchess of Berry, Duchess of Orléans, established, early in the sixteenth century, the monastery of L'Annonciade at Châteauneuf-sur-Loire. Etienne Dolet (1509–46), a printer, philologian, and pamphleteer, executed at Paris as an atheist, and looked upon by some as a "martyr of the Renaissance", was a native of Orléans.

Cardinal Odet de Coligny, who joined the Reformation about 1560, was Abbot of St. Euvertius, of Fontainejean, Ferrières, and St. Benoît. The Protestant leader, Admiral Coligny (1519–72), the principal victim of the St. Bartholomew's Day massacre, was born at Châtillon-sur-Loing in the present diocese.

At the beginning of the religious wars, Orléans was disputed between the followers of the Guise family and of the Protestant Condé.

Despite the fact that he was appointed bishop in April 1552, Bishop Jean de Morvillier (1552–1564) was not able to make his formal entry into Orléans until 26 November 1559. The Chapter had complained on 3 November 1552 that they would not receive him because he wore a beard. In 1556, King Henry II intervened, announcing that he was sending the bishop on a diplomatic mission to countries which required that he be bearded. The Chapter finally gave way. In 1560, King Francis II and Queen Mary Stuart came to Orléans to preside over a meeting of the Estates. The king died there on 5 December 1460.

In 1562, while Bishop Morvillier was in Italy, attending the Council of Trent the First French War of Religion (1562–1563) broke out. In the vicinity of Orléans, François, Duke of Guise was assassinated on 24 February 1563.

The Calvinist Jacques Bongars, councillor and ambassador of King Henry IV of France, who collected and edited the chronicles of the Crusades in his "Gesta Dei per Francos", was born at Orléans in 1554, and died in Paris in 1612. The Jesuit Denis Pétau (Dionysius Petavius), a renowned scholar and theologian, was born at Orléans in 1583. Françoise de la Croix (1591–1657), a pupil of Vincent de Paul, who founded the congregation of Augustinian Sisters of Charity of Notre Dame, was born at Petay in the diocese (at the time in the diocese of Chartres). St. Jane de Chantal, superior of the Sisters of the Visitation, visited the Orléans convent of the Visitation late in 1627. Madame Jeanne Guyon, a noted advocate of Quietism, was born at Montargis in 1648.

=== French Revolution ===
On 2 November 1789, the National Assembly proclaimed that all ecclesiastical property was confiscated by the State.

Even before it directed its attention to the Church directly, the National Constituent Assembly attacked the institution of monasticism. On 13 February 1790. it issued a decree which stated that the government would no longer recognize solemn religious vows taken by either men or women. In consequence, Orders and Congregations which lived under a Rule were suppressed in France. Members of either sex were free to leave their monasteries or convents if they wished, and could claim an appropriate pension by applying to the local municipal authority.

The National Constituent Assembly ordered the replacement of political subdivisions of the ancien régime with subdivisions called "departments", to be characterized by a single administrative city in the center of a compact area. The decree was passed on 22 December 1789, and the boundaries fixed on 26 February 1790, with the effective date of 4 March 1790. A new department was created, called "Loiret", and its administrative center was fixd at Orléans.

The National Constituent Assembly then, on 6 February 1790, instructed its ecclesiastical committee to prepare a plan for the reorganization of the clergy. At the end of May, its work was presented as a draft Civil Constitution of the Clergy, which, after vigorous debate, was approved on 12 July 1790. There was to be one diocese in each department, requiring the suppression of approximately fifty dioceses. The former diocese of Orléans became the diocese of Loiret. In place of the former ecclesiastical provinces, each headed by an archbishop, the National Assembly decreed ten new metropolitanates in France. The diocese of Loiret (formerly Orléans) was assigned to the metropolitanate of Paris.

The Civil Constitution of the Clergy also abolished Chapters, canonries, prebends, and other offices both in cathedrals and in collegiate churches. It also abolished chapters in abbeys and priories of either sex, whether regular or secular.

Of the 129 bishops of French dioceses alive on 1 January 1791, only four took it upon themselves to swear the oath of allegiance to the Civil Constitution of the Clergy. One of them was Jarente de Senas d’Orgeval, Bishop of Orléans.

=== Restoration ===
The French Directory fell in the coup engineered by Talleyrand and Napoleon on 10 November 1799. The coup resulted in the establishment of the French Consulate, with Napoleon as the First Consul. To advance his aggressive military foreign policy, he decided to make peace with the Catholic Church in France and with the Papacy. In the concordat of 1801 with Pope Pius VII, and in the enabling papal bull, "Qui Christi Domini", the constitutional diocese of Cher and all the other dioceses in France, were suppressed. This removed all the institutional contaminations and novelties introduced by the Constitutional Church, and voided all of the episcopal appointments of both authentic and constitutional bishops. The diocesan structure was then canonically re-established by the papal bull "Qui Christi Domini" of 29 November 1801, including the diocese of Orléans, which was named a suffragan (subordinate) of Paris. The Concordat was registered as a French law on 8 April 1802.

=== Recent history ===
In 1850, the diocese of Orléans was divided for administrative purposes into four archdeaconries (Orléans, Montargis, Pithiviers, and Gien) and twenty-nine deaneries; in addition there were five city deaneries. There were 429 priests in a population of 331,633. The cathedral of Saint-Croix was a parish church for c. 8,000 persons.

The Cathedral chapter consisted of 3 dignities (the Dean, the Subdean, and the Archpriest) and nine canons. There were in addition three canons of honor, the bishops of Langres, Tours, and Metz, each of which had an earlier connection to the diocese.

The Church of Orléans was the last in France to give up the Gallican liturgy (1874) and take up the Roman liturgy, as required by the First Vatican Council.

Prior to the Associations Law of 1901, the Diocese of Orléans counted Franciscans, Benedictines, Missionary Priests of the Society of Mary, Lazarists, Missionaries of the Sacred Heart and several orders of teaching Brothers, including the Brothers of the Christian Schools. Among the congregations of women which originated in this diocese must be mentioned: the Benedictines of Our Lady of Calvary, a teaching and nursing order founded in 1617 by Princess Antoinette d'Orléans-Longueville, and authorized in the diocese of Orléans in 1827; and the Capuchin François Leclerc du Tremblay, known as Père Joseph; the Sisters of St. Aignan, a teaching order founded in 1853 by Bishop Dupanloup, with mother-house in Orléans.

Bishop Guy Riobé (1963–1978), took a public stand in opposition to nuclear weapons, which led to an altercation with a member of Georges Pompidou's government. His successor, Jean-Marie Lustiger, who had been born of a Polish Jewish family and had converted to Catholicism, was appointed in 1979, and shortly afterwards was transferred to the archdiocese if Paris; he was named a cardinal by Pope John Paul II on 2 February 1983, and elected a member of the Académie Française on 15 June 1995.

== Bishops of Orléans ==
=== To 1200 ===
- Diclopitus (346)

? Eortius (374?)

- Anianus (Agnan) (c. 451)
- Prosper (after 451–463?)
- Eusebius (c. 511)
- Leontius (c. 533)
- Antoninus (538)
- Marcus (c. 541–549)
- Namatius (c. 581–587)
- Austrinus (c. 594–604)
- Liudigislus (c. 614)
- Audo (c. 650–667)
- ? Sigobertus (c. 683)
- Suavaricus (c. 693–697)
- Eucherius of Orléans (c. 719–738)
- Deotimius (c. 790)
- Theodulfus (c. 798–821)
- Jonas (821 – 843)
- Agius
- Walterius (c. 869–891)
- Trohannus
- Berno
- Anselmus
- Theodericus
- Ermentheus
- Arnulfus
- Manasses
- Arnulfus (II) (c. 987–1003)
- Fulco (1003– )
- Theodericus (II) (1016–1021)
- Odolricus (1021–1031)
- Isembardus
- Hadericus
- Rainerius (c. 1066–1082)
- Arnulfus (III)
- Joannes (1085–1096)
- Sanctio (1096)
- Jean (1096–1135 )
- Elias (1137–1146)
- Manasses (II) (1146–1185)
- Henricus (1186–1198)

=== From 1200 to 1450 ===
- Hugo de Garlande (1198–1206)
- Manassas de Seignelay (1207–1221)
- Philippus de Jojaco (1221–1234)
- Philip Berruyer (1234–1236)
- Guilelmus de Bussi (1238–1258)
- Robert de Courtenay (1258–1279)
- Egidius de Pa(s)te (1282–1288)
- Pierre de Mornay (1288–1296)
- Ferricus (1296–1299)
- Bertrand de Saint-Denis (1299–1307)
- Radulfus Grosparmi (1308–1311)
- Milo de Chailli (1312–1321)
- Roger le Fort (1321–1328)
- Jean de Conflans (1328–1349)
- Philippe de Conflans (1349)
- Jean de Montmorency (1349–1363)
- Hugues de Faydit (1363–1371)
- Jean Nicot (1371–1383) Avignon Obedience
- Fulco de Chanac (1383–1394) Avignon Obedience
- Guy de Prunelé (1394–1425?) Avignon Obedience
- Jean de S. Michel (Carmichael) (1426–1435)

Sede vacante (1435–1438)

- Guillaume Charrier (1438–1439)
- Regnault de Chartres (1439–1444) Apostolic Administrator
- Jean de Gué (1444–1447)
- Pierre Bureau (1447–1451)

=== From 1450 to 1650 ===
- Johannes de Harecuria (1451–1452)
- Thibault d'Assigny (1452–1473)
- François de Brillac (1473–1504)
- Christophe de Brillac (1504–1514)
- Germain de Gannai (1514–1520)
- Jean d’Orléans-Longueville (1521–1533)
- Antoine Sanguin de Meudon (1533–1550)
- François de Faucon (1550–1551)
- Pierre du Chastel (1551–1552)
- Jean de Morvillier (1552–1564)
- Mathurin de la Saussaye (1564–1584)
- Denis Hurault (1584–1586)
- Germain Vaillant de Guelin (1586–1587)
- Jean de L’Aubespine (1588–1596)
- Gabriel de L’Aubespine (1604–1630)
- Nicolas de Netz (1631–1646)

=== From 1650 to 1800 ===
- Alphonse d’Elbène (1647–1665)
- Pierre-Armand du Cambout de Coislin (1666–1706)
- Louis-Gaston Fleuriau d’Armenonville (1706–1733)
- Nicolas-Joseph de Paris (1733–1754)
- Louis-Joseph de Montmorency-Laval (1754–1758)
- Louis-Sextius de Jarente de La Bruyère (1758–1788)
- Louis-François-Alexandre de Jarente de Senas d’Orgeval (1788–1793)

Sede vacate (1793–1802)

=== Since 1802 ===
- Etienne-Alexandre-Jean-Baptiste-Marie Bernier (1802–1806)
- Claude-Louis Rousseau (1807–1810)

Sede vacante (1810–1819)

- Pierre-Marin Rouph de Varicourt (1819–1822)
- Jean Brumauld de Beauregard (1823–1839)
- François-Nicholas-Madeleine Morlot (1839–1842)
- Jean-Jacques Fayet (1842–1849)
- Félix-Antoine-Philibert Dupanloup (1849–1878)
- Pierre-Hector Coullié (Couillié) (1878–1893)
- Stanislas-Arthur-Xavier Touchet (1894–1926)
- Jules-Marie-Victor Courcoux (1926–1951)
- Robert Picard de La Vacquerie (27 Aug 1951 Appointed – 23 May 1963 Resigned)
- Guy-Marie-Joseph Riobé (23 May 1963 Succeeded – 18 Jul 1978 Died)
- Jean-Marie Lustiger (1979–1981)
- René Lucien Picandet (13 Jun 1981 Appointed – 20 Oct 1997 Died)
- Gérard Antoine Daucourt (1998–2002)
- André Louis Fort (28 Nov 2002 Appointed – 27 Jul 2010 Retired)
- Jacques André Blaquart (27 Jul 2010 Appointed – )

=== Pilgrimages ===
The principal pilgrimages of the diocese are: Our Lady of Bethlehem, at Ferrières; Our Lady of Miracles in Orléans city, dating back to the seventh century (Joan of Arc visited the sanctuary on 8 May 1429); Our Lady of Cléry, dating from the thirteenth century, visited by kings Philip the Fair, Philip VI, and especially by Louis XI, who wore in his hat a leaden image of Notre Dame de Cléry and who wished to have his tomb in this sanctuary where Jean de Dunois, one of the heroes of the Hundred Years' War, was also interred.

== See also ==
- Council of Orléans (index article of 9 councils)
- Catholic Church in France

== Bibliography ==
=== Reference works ===
- Gams, Pius Bonifatius (1873). Series episcoporum Ecclesiae catholicae: quotquot innotuerunt a beato Petro apostolo. Ratisbon: Typis et Sumptibus Georgii Josephi Manz. (Use with caution; obsolete)
- Eubel, Conradus, ed. (1913). Hierarchia catholica (in Latin). Vol. 1 (second ed.). Münster: Libreria Regensbergiana.
- Eubel, Conradus, ed. (1914). Hierarchia catholica (in Latin). Vol. 2 (second ed.). Münster: Libreria Regensbergiana.
- Eubel, Conradus; Gulik, Guilelmus, eds. (1923). Hierarchia catholica (in Latin). Vol. 3 (second ed.). Münster: Libreria Regensbergiana.
- Gauchat, Patritius (Patrice) (1935). Hierarchia catholica (in Latin). Vol. 4 (1592-1667). Münster: Libraria Regensbergiana.
- Ritzler, Remigius; Sefrin, Pirminus (1952). Hierarchia catholica medii et recentis aevi (in Latin). Vol. V (1667-1730). Patavii: Messagero di S. Antonio.
- Ritzler, Remigius; Sefrin, Pirminus (1958). Hierarchia catholica medii et recentis aevi (in Latin). Vol. VI (1730-1799). Patavii: Messagero di S. Antonio.
- Ritzler, Remigius; Sefrin, Pirminus (1968). Hierarchia Catholica medii et recentioris aevi (in Latin). Vol. VII (1800–1846). Monasterii: Libr. Regensburgiana.
- Remigius Ritzler; Pirminus Sefrin (1978). Hierarchia catholica Medii et recentioris aevi (in Latin). Vol. VIII (1846–1903). Il Messaggero di S. Antonio.
- Pięta, Zenon (2002). Hierarchia catholica medii et recentioris aevi (in Latin). Vol. IX (1903–1922). Padua: Messagero di San Antonio. ISBN 978-88-250-1000-8.

=== Studies ===
- Benedictines of Saint-Maur (1744). Gallia christiana, in provincias ecclesiasticas distributa (in Latin). Vol. Tomus octavus (VIII). Paris: ex Typographia Regia. pp. 1408–1499. pp. 1408–1595; "Instrumenta," pp. 480–546.
- Bimbenet, Jean Eugène. Histoire de la ville d'Orléans. (in French). Orléans: H. Herluison. Volume 2 (1885).
- Bouvier, Pierre (1914). Étude sur l'Hôtel-Dieu d'Orléans au Moyen Age et au XVIe siècle. (in French and Latin). Orléans: Paul Pigelet 1914. [The Hôtel-Dieu was the poor-house attached to the cathedral Chapter.]
- Cochard, Th. (1907); Société bibliographique (France). L'épiscopat français depuis le Concordat jusqu'à la Séparation (1802-1905). (in French). Paris: Librairie des Saints-Pères, 1907. Pp. 426-442.
- Cuissard, Charles (1898). "La peste noire à Orléans," (in French), in: Mémoires de la Société d'agriculture, sciences, belles-lettres et arts d'Orléans vol. 36 (1898), pp. 105–165.
- Cuissard, Charles (1905). "Les canons et les dignitaires de la cathédrale d'Orléans," (in French), in: Mémoires de la Société archéologique et historique de l'Orléanais volume 29 (Orléans: Herluison 1905), pp. 59-257. [lists of all known members, original documents]
- Duchateau, Eugène (1888). Histoire du diocèse d'Orléans. (in French). Orléans: Herluison 1888.
- Duchesne, Louis (1910). Fastes épiscopaux de l'ancienne Gaule: II. L'Aquitaine et les Lyonnaises (in French) (2nd ed.). Paris: Fontemoing. Archive.
- Du Tems, Hugues (1774). Le clergé de France, ou tableau historique et chronologique des archevêques, évêques, abbés, abbesses et chefs des chapitres principaux du royaume, depuis la fondation des églises jusqu'à nos jours (in French). Vol. Tome premier. Paris: Delalain.
- Foulques de Villaret, Amicie de (1882). Recherches historiques sur l'ancien chapitre de l'église d'Orléans de son origine jusqu'au XVIe siècleavec documents inédits et plan de l'ancien cloitre. (in French and Latin). Orléans: H. Herluison 1882.
- Head, Thomas (2005). Hagiography and the Cult of Saints: The Diocese of Orléans, 800-1200. Cambridge: Cambridge University Press 2005.
- Jean, Armand (1891). Les évêques et les archevêques de France depuis 1682 jusqu'à 1801 (in French). Paris: A. Picard.
- Lagrange, François. Vie de Mgr Dupanloup, évêque d'Orleans, membre de l'Académie Française. (in French). 4th edition. Paris: Poussielgue. Volume 2 (1884).
- Marcilhacy, Christianne (1964). Le diocèse d'Orléans au milieu du XIXe siècle : les hommes et leurs mentalités. (in French). Paris: Sirey.
- Pelletier, Victor (1855). Les Évêques d'Orléans depuis les origines chrétiennes jusqu'à nos jours. Orléans: Alphonse Gatineau 1855.

=== External links ===
- Centre national des Archives de l'Église de France, (in French), Liste_eveques_France_XXe_siecle.pdf L’Épiscopat francais depuis 1919, retrieved: 2016-12-24.
- "Diocese of Orléans". Catholic-Hierarchy.org. David M. Cheney.
