= Orléans Cathedral =

Roman catholic cathedral in Orléans, France

Cathedral of the Holy Cross of Orléans
- Cathédrale Sainte-Croix d'Orléans
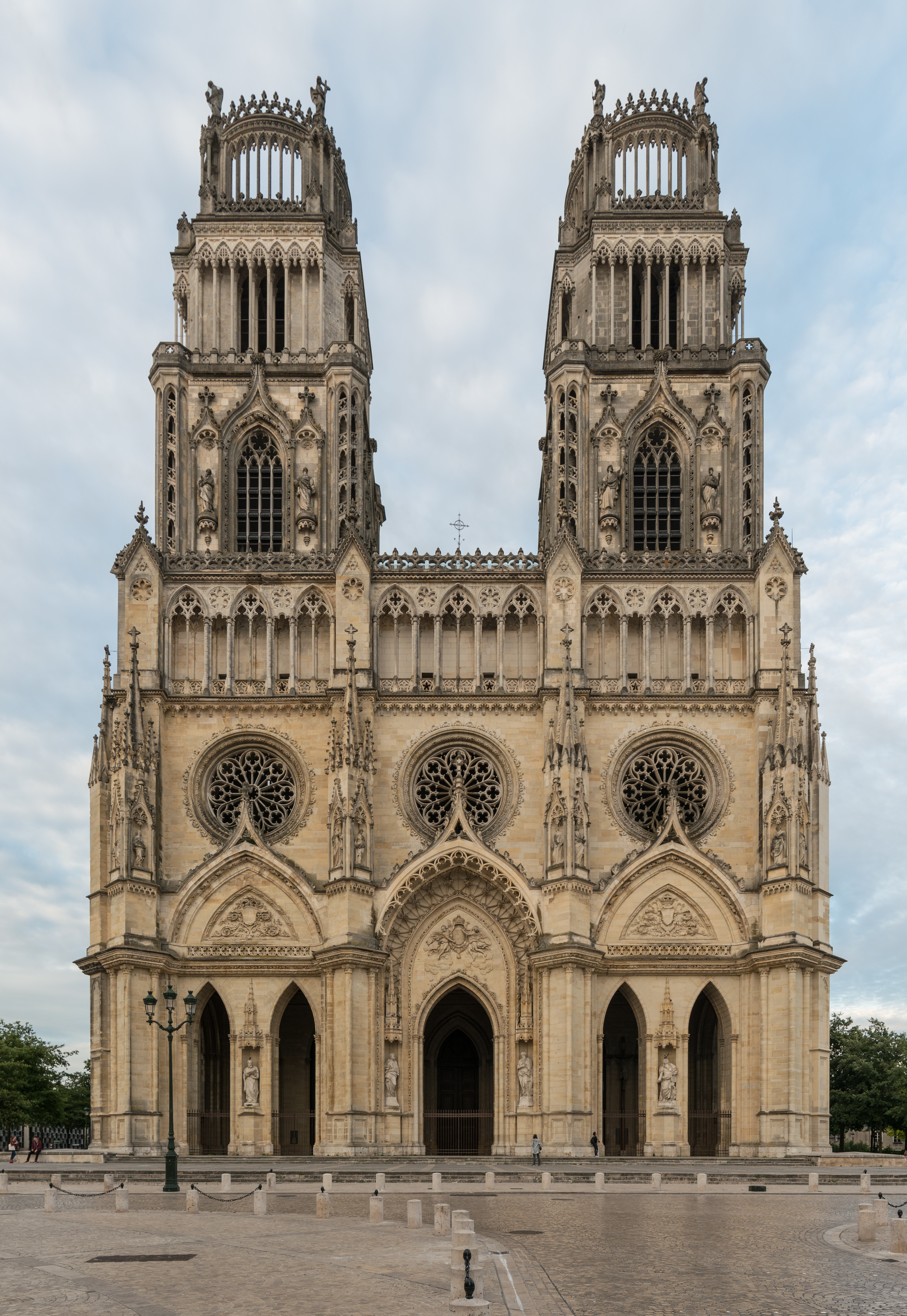
- Orléans Cathedral
- Cathedral of the Holy Cross of Orléans
- 47°54′4″N 1°54′38″E
- Location: Orléans, France
- Denomination: Roman Catholic Church
- Churchmanship: Roman

History
- Status: Cathedral, Minor Basilica

Architecture
- Functional status: Active
- Architectural type: Church
- Style: Gothic, Gothic Revival
- Groundbreaking: 1278; 748 years ago
- Completed: 1829; 197 years ago

Specifications
- Height: 88 m (288 ft 9 in)
- Materials: Stone

Administration
- Province: Orléans

Clergy
- Archbishop: Vincent Jordy

Monument historique
- Official name: Cathédrale Sainte-Croix d'Orléans
- Type: Classé
- Designated: 1862
- Reference no.: PA00098836

Orléans Cathedral (French: Basilique Cathédrale Sainte-Croix d'Orléans) is a Roman Catholic cathedral located in the city of Orléans, France. The cathedral is the seat of the Bishop of Orléans. Built on the ruins of a Roman temple from 1278 to 1329, the cathedral was partially destroyed in 1568 by the Huguenots during the French Wars of Religion and rebuilt in a Gothic style between 1601 and 1829. During the Siege of Orléans, the cathedral was visited frequently by Joan of Arc. The structure stands as one of the largest and last gothic built cathedrals in France and has been listed as a national historic monument since 1862.

== History ==
=== First cathedral ===
The earliest known account of the construction of a cathedral in Orléans was in 330 AD, in which was then still called Aurelianum to Saint Euverte of Orléans, a 4th-century Roman bishop. However archaeological evidence suggests that the site may have been the location of an even older Roman pagan temple dating to the 1st century. After the spread of Christianity throughout the Roman Empire, it was said that the church received grants for further construction from Emperor Constantine and a morsel of the True Cross that had been discovered in Jerusalem. The cathedral was not directly impacted by the siege of the city by Atilla the Hun in 451 and later the fall of Rome itself, and despite looting by Normans in 865, the structure continued to be revamped and extended. By this time, the cathedral had grown large enough to hold the coronations of kings, including Charles the Bald in 848, and King Odo in 888.

After the destruction of most of the city including the cathedral by fire in 989, Hugh Capet and his son Robert the Pious, saw to it that Bishop Arnoul I had sufficient funds to rebuild a new cathedral. The structure was completed in 1000 and was constructed in the Romanesque style. With the addition of two belltowers in 1108, the cathedral became the largest of its kind in France, the same year Louis VI of France was crowned inside of the cathedral. At the same time as Robert the Pious was rebuilding the nearby Church of Saint-Aignan, a new choir was installed in the same early Romanesque style featuring an ambulatory and three radiating chapels, and stood as the only vaulted section of the Romanesque cathedral. During the 11th century, the cathedral became a stopover site for Christians on the pilgrimage to Santiago de Compostela.

=== Second and current cathedral ===
By the late 13th century, structural instability led to two partial vault and exterior collapses, and a complete reconstruction of the church was ordered by Robert de Courtenay. Forced to accompany King Louis IX on the Crusades however, he left the building to his successor, Gilles Pasté, who laid the foundation stone on September 11, 1288. The old towers of the facade were kept, however, the structure was constructed on a higher level than the previous church and extended out much further on all four sides. In addition to this modification, the cathedral was reconstructed in Rayonnant Gothic style, similar to Notre-Dame de Paris and Amiens Cathedral. During the Siege of Orléans by English forces in 1429, Joan of Arc visited and prayed in the cathedral while in the city to lift the siege. After the Hundred Years' War, work resumed and the cathedral was finished in 1530, 243 years after the start of construction. During the Wars of Religion, the cathedral was looted in 1562, at the same time as other churches in Orléans, and in 1568, the building was severely damaged by Protestant Huguenots, who destroyed the medieval steeple and arches.

After the signing of the Edict of Nantes in 1598, Henry IV of France ordered a rebuilding project completely restoring the cathedral. Construction promptly started in 1601, with the first stone being laid by Maria de Medici. Most of the structure was rebuilt similarly to its predecessor, however, notable new additions included flying buttresses, vaults to the transept, and the replacement of the old Gothic facade with a mix of Italian Gothic and Classical styles. In addition, the demolition of the main entrance marked the removal of the last remaining part of the original Roman cathedral. In the late 18th century, the Romanesque towers were replaced by the more imposing bell towers seen today, and the main tower above the transept crossing was replaced by a slender Gothic Revival steeple. The cathedral was consecrated by Charles X in 1829, nearly 600 years after its initial completion, and despite functioning as a gothic cathedral, Orleans Cathedral was designated as a basilica by Pope Pius IX. Unlike other cathedrals around France at the time, cathedral suffered little damage during World War I, but sustained severe damage during World War II, first by artillery from German forces during the Battle of France, then later by Allied bombings. However, extensive restoration work was initiated after the war, and still continues today.

== Design & Architecture ==
=== Organ ===
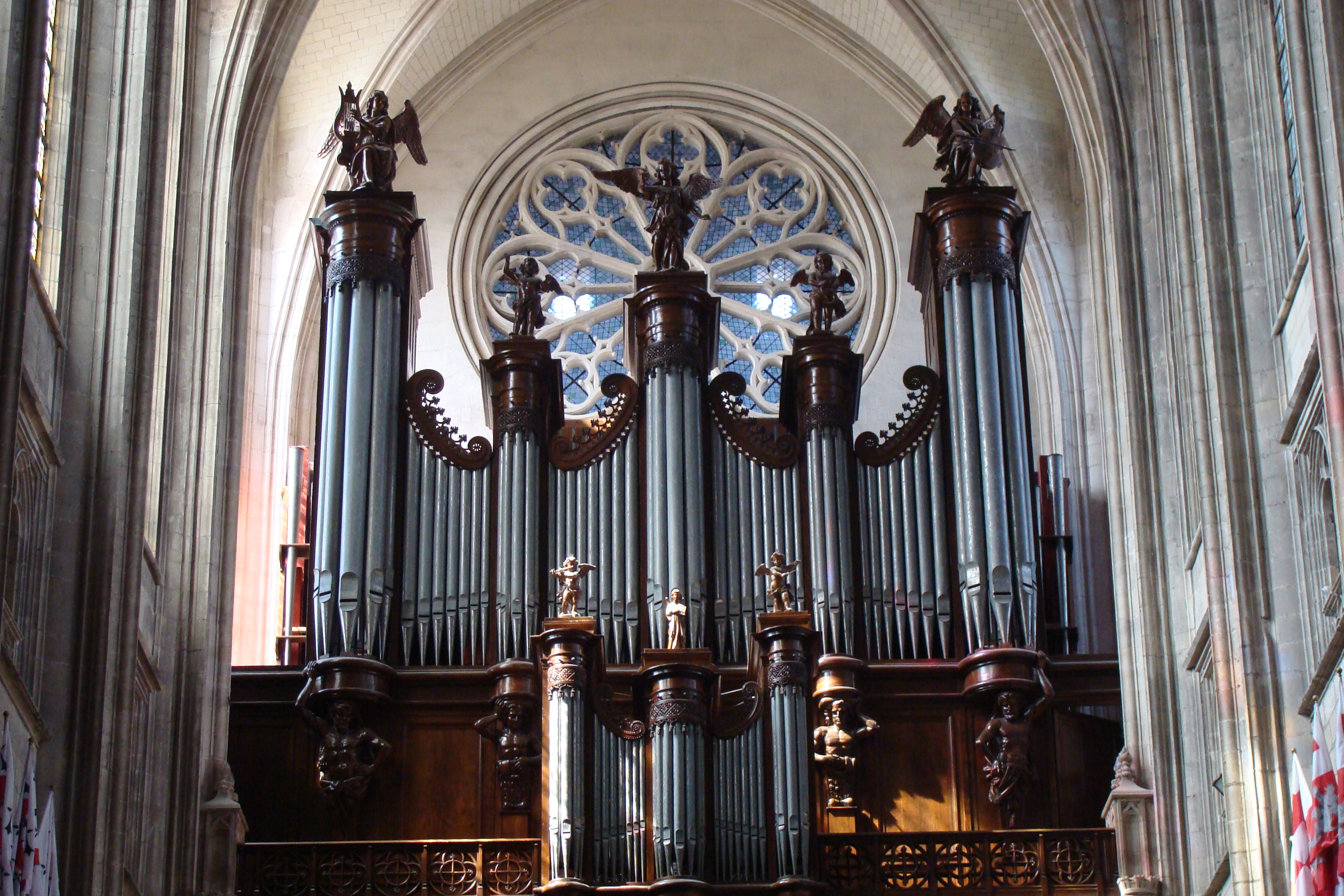
organ inside the cathedral

Orléans Cathedral has two organs: a large Grand Organ above the entrance and a smaller Choir Organ. Both organs have been classified as national monuments and have been continuously restored since installation. Installed in 1880, the large organ above the entrance is one of few large Cavaillé-Coll organs in France that have not had any major additions, alterations, or redesigns. The grand organ was established as a historical monument in 1973 following a report from Marie-Claire Alain, where it was described as "a perfect authentic example of the works of Cavaillé-Coll". The much smaller chancel organ was also built by Cavaillé-Coll in 1846 and rebuilt in 1996.

=== Facade and Towers ===
The west façade of the cathedral is characterized by its three intricately sculpted portals, rose windows, and two symmetrical towers, with the highest point of the cathedral, the belltower, reaching a height of 114 metres and the towers 88 metres each. The facade adheres to the Flamboyant Gothic style, and is marked by ornate tracery, crocketed gables, and a strong vertical emphasis. The entrance portals are decorated with biblical scenes and saints, including references to Joan of Arc.

=== Nave and Vaulting ===
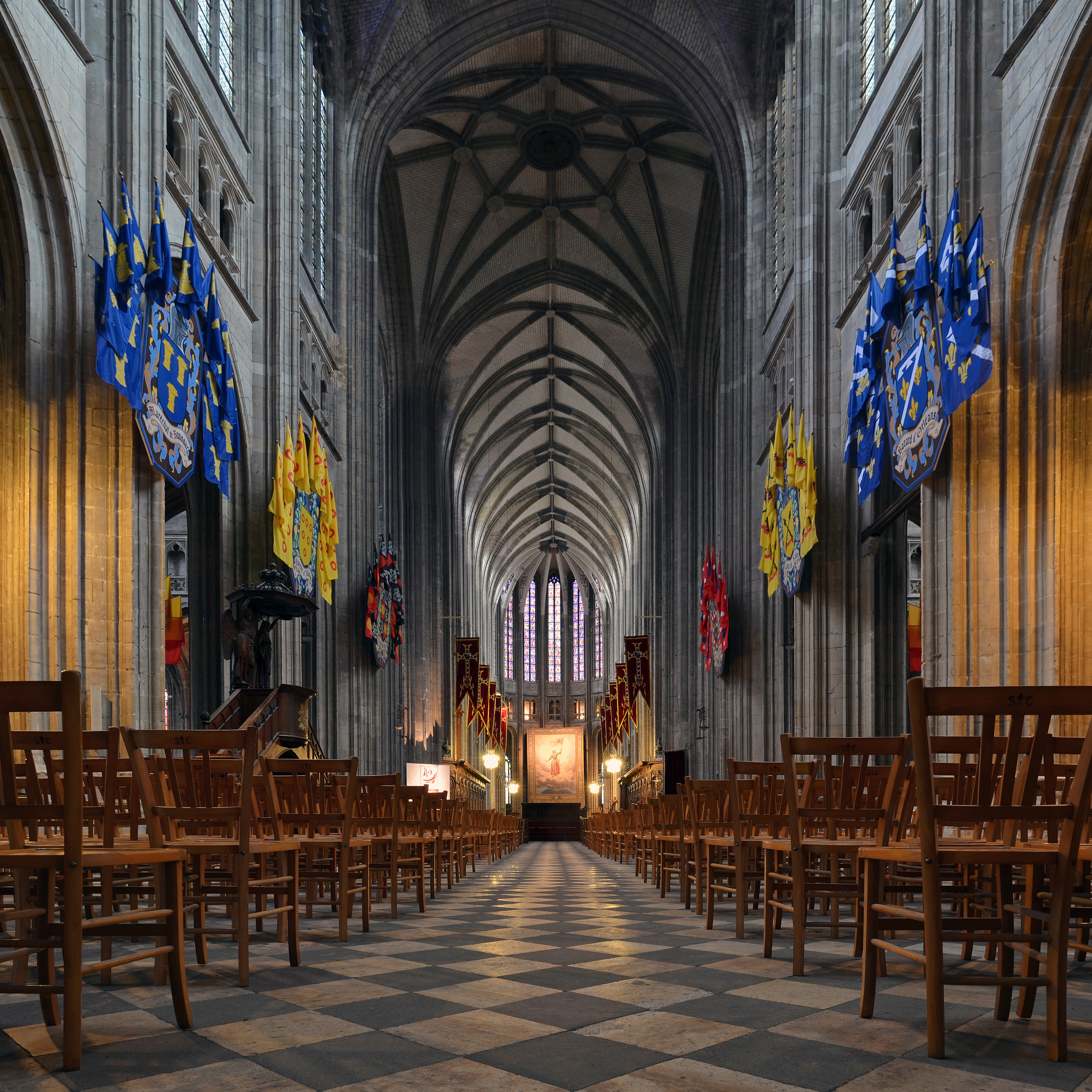
Nave of the cathedral

Reflecting off influences from the earlier Rayonnant Gothic style, the structure of the cathedral features a broader-than-usual five-aisled nave compared to other cathedrals such as Amiens or Reims, and is one of the widest in France. Furthermore, the traditional ribbed vaulting, pointed arches, and columns emphasize verticality and create a sense of soaring space typical of the Gothic aesthetic.

=== Choir and Ambulatory ===
The choir and stalls, designed by Jacques Gabriel and Jules Degoullons in the 18th century, are surrounded by a double ambulatory, allowing for the circulation of pilgrims and access to the radiating chapels. The altar and choir furnishings blend Gothic revival elements introduced during 19th-century restorations. The cathedral's apse branches off into 13 chapels, each dedicated to various saints and kings, including Saint Louis and Louis IX. Many of the chapels are exquisitely painted and, unusually, have human heads on their ceiling keystones, a feature also seen in Notre-Dame de Paris cathedral.

=== Stained Glass ===
Due to damage from World War II and the Wars of Religion, most of the cathedral's stained glass with the exception of the rose windows date from the 19th century. Many of the windows follow traditional Gothic themes, such as scenes from the Old and New Testaments, including the Nativity, Crucifixion, Resurrection of Christ, and the lives of various saints and apostles. 10 late 19th century stained glass windows also retrace Joan of Arc's story according to the Church. The transept has a large rose window at either end, which depict the royal sun at its height on the south side and the setting sun on the north side. Both windows, filled in 1679, were thus made to represent the Sun King Louis XIV.

== Burials ==
- John Stewart of Darnley, a Scottish nobleman and military commander who served as Constable of the Scottish Army in France, supporting the French during the Hundred Years' War.

== See also ==
- List of Gothic Cathedrals in Europe

== Sources and external links ==
Media related to Orléans Cathedral at Wikimedia Commons

- Orleans Cathedral - World History Encyclopedia
- Map showing the city in which this church is located.
- (in French) Diocese of Orléans official website
- (in French)Ministry of Culture: Cathédrale Sainte-Croix d'Orléans
- Orleans Cathedral at Structurae
