= Namatius (bishop of Orléans) =

French Catholic bishop (died 587)

Namatius (died 587) was the bishop of Orléans at the first and second synods of Mâcon in 581 and 585. He and Bertram of Le Mans were sent as envoys to the Bretons by Guntram, the king of Burgundy, whose capital was Orléans. He died on his return journey.

== Sources ==
- Gillett, Andrew (2003). Envoys and Political Communication in the Late Antique West, 411–533. Cambridge University Press.
