= Diocese of Le Mans =

Catholic diocese of France

Coordinates: 48°00′28″N 0°11′55″E

Diocese of Le Mans Dioecesis Cenomanensis Diocèse du Mans

Catholic
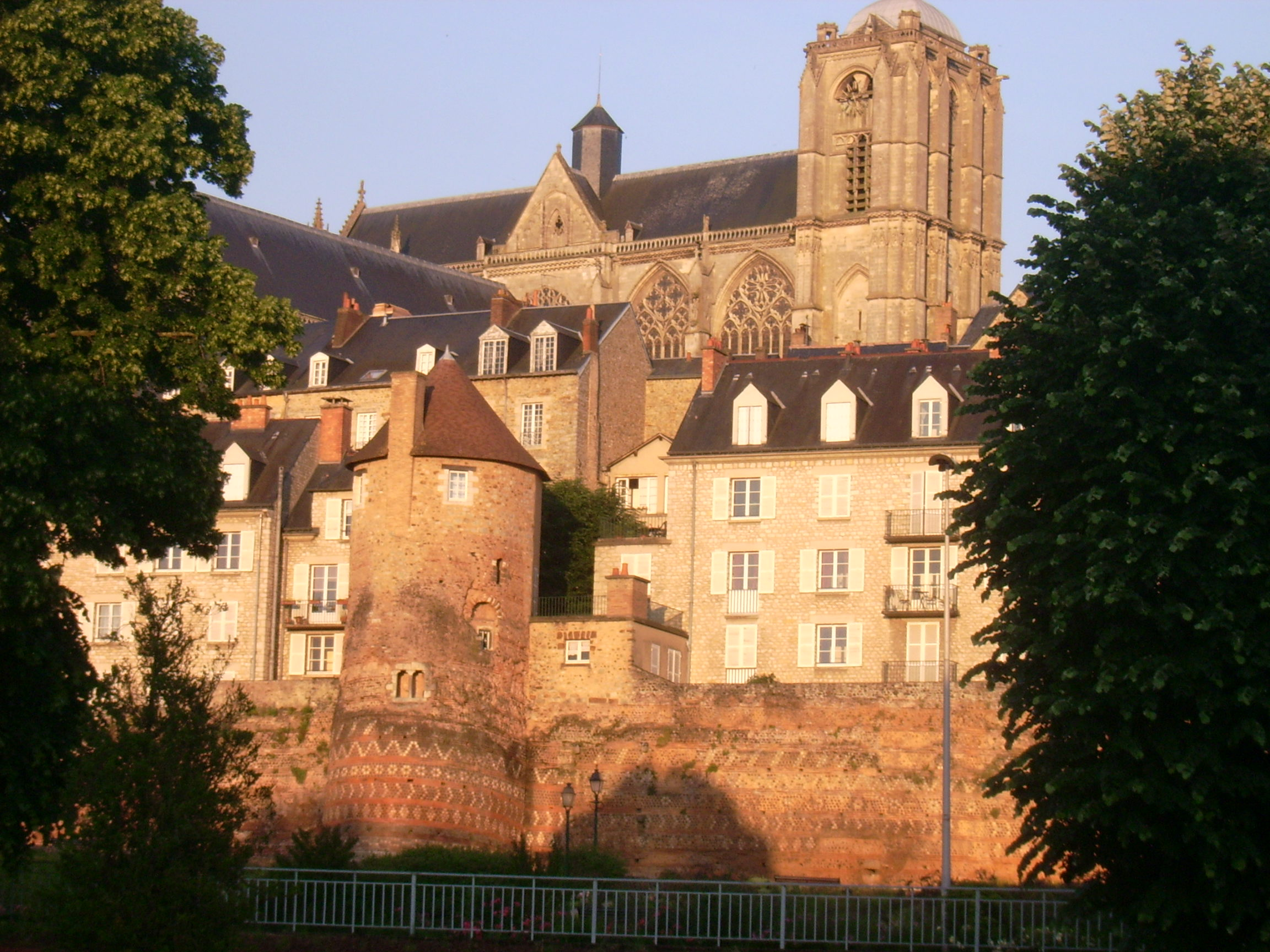
- Le Mans Cathedral

Location
- Country: France
- Ecclesiastical province: Rennes
- Metropolitan: Archdiocese of Rennes, Dol, and Saint-Malo

Statistics
- Area: 6,244 km^{2} (2,411 sq mi)
- Population: Total; Catholics: (as of 2021); 579,120; 371,760 (64.2%)
- Parishes: 93

Information
- Denomination: Roman Catholic
- Sui iuris church: Latin Church
- Rite: Roman Rite
- Established: 5th century
- Cathedral: Cathedral of St. Julian of Le Mans
- Patron saint: St. Julian of Le Mans
- Secular priests: 79 (Diocesan); 19 (religious Orders)(2019 number); 30 Permanent Deacons

Current leadership
- Pope: Leo XIV
- Bishop: Jean-Pierre Vuillemin
- Metropolitan Archbishop: Pierre d'Ornellas

Map

Website
- Website of the Diocese

The Diocese of Le Mans (Latin: Dioecesis Cenomanensis; French: Diocèse du Mans) is a Latin Church diocese of the Catholic Church in France. The diocese is now a suffragan of the Archdiocese of Rennes, Dol and Saint-Malo, but had previously been suffragan to Bourges, Paris, Sens, and Tours (in ascending order).

In 2021, in the Diocese of Tulle there was one priest for every 4,705.

== Area ==
The Diocese of Le Mans comprises the entire department of Sarthe, created during the French Revolution on 4 March 1790, pursuant to the law of 22 December 1789; the province of Maine was divided into two departments, Sarthe to the east and Mayenne to the west. Prior to the French Revolution it comprised 636 parishes, and was one of the most extensive dioceses of France; at the time of the Concordat of 1801, it lost some parishes in Vendômois and Normandy, and acquired some in Anjou. The Diocese of Le Mans thereafter embraced 665 communes, up to 1855, when the department of Mayenne was detached to form the Diocese of Laval.

== History ==
The origin of the Diocese of Le Mans has given rise to discussions concerning the value of the Gesta domni Aldrici, and of the Actus Pontificum Cenomannis in urbe degentium. Collectively called "the Le Mans forgeries", they were compiled in the episcopal curia at Le Mans during the episcopate of Aldric (832-857). The counterfeit extends to early charters of the diocese, and to various saints' lives. Even the Testament of Bishop Aldric was falsified to fit the fraudsters' purposes: to inflate the bishop's authority, and entitlement to various properties within the diocese, including monasteries normally under the king. This applied especially to the Benedictine abbey at Saint-Calais. The various mendacious claims were thrown out at a Synod at Verberie in 869, by both the king (Charles the Bald) and the bishops and abbots he had assembled.

During the time of Bishop Bertrand in the last part of the sixth century, the diocese underwent a survey (pouillé). It too was corrupted and used by the ninth century forger of the Actus Pontificum Cenomannis in urbe degentium, rendering it useless. It names several parishes recently created in the ninth century among thirty four allegedly founded by St Julianus, one of the Seventy disciples.

The "Gesta" relate that Bishop Aldric (ca. 800-857) had the bodies of Saints Julianus, Turibius, Pavatius, Romanus, Liborius, and Hadoindus, first bishops of Mans, brought to his cathedral; the Acts make St. Julianus one of the seventy-two disciples of Christ and state that he arrived at Le Mans with two companions: Turibius, who became bishop under Antoninus (138-161), and Pavatius who was bishop under Maximinus (235-238) and under Aurelian (270-275), in which event, Pavatius would have lived over two hundred years. Liborius, successor of Pavatius, would have been the contemporary of Valentinian (364-375). Of course, if Julian had been of the apostolic age, he would not have been termed a 'bishop', nor would he have founded a church or cathedral. Christians were not a legal cult until the time of Constantine I (d. 337), and a diocese could neither own property as a collective entity nor build public places of worship.

According to the Catholic Encyclopedia, "these chronological absurdities of the Acts have led Louis Duchesne to conclude that the first Bishop of Le Mans whose episcopate can be dated with certainty is Victurius, who attended the Councils of Angers and of Tours, in 453 and 461, and to whom Gregory of Tours alludes as 'a venerable confessor'. Turibius who, according to the Acts, was the successor of Julianus, was, on the contrary, successor to Victurius and occupied the see from 490 to 496."

In January 2017, the Diocese of Le Mans set up policy guidelines aimed at tackling the sex abuse crisis facing the Diocese.

== Cathedral and churches ==
The buildings that served as the cathedral of Le Mans before 1080 are known only through textual evidence. Even the textual evidence, such as it is, shows that there was no work of any importance on the cathedral from 557 to 832, the beginning of the reign of Bishop Aldric, though it was interrupted by his flight from his diocese. The new choir, at least, was consecrated before his flight, in 834, according to the Acta. During the reign of Bishop Gontier, the town of Le Mans was attacked and the cathedral was pillaged by Comte Rotger.

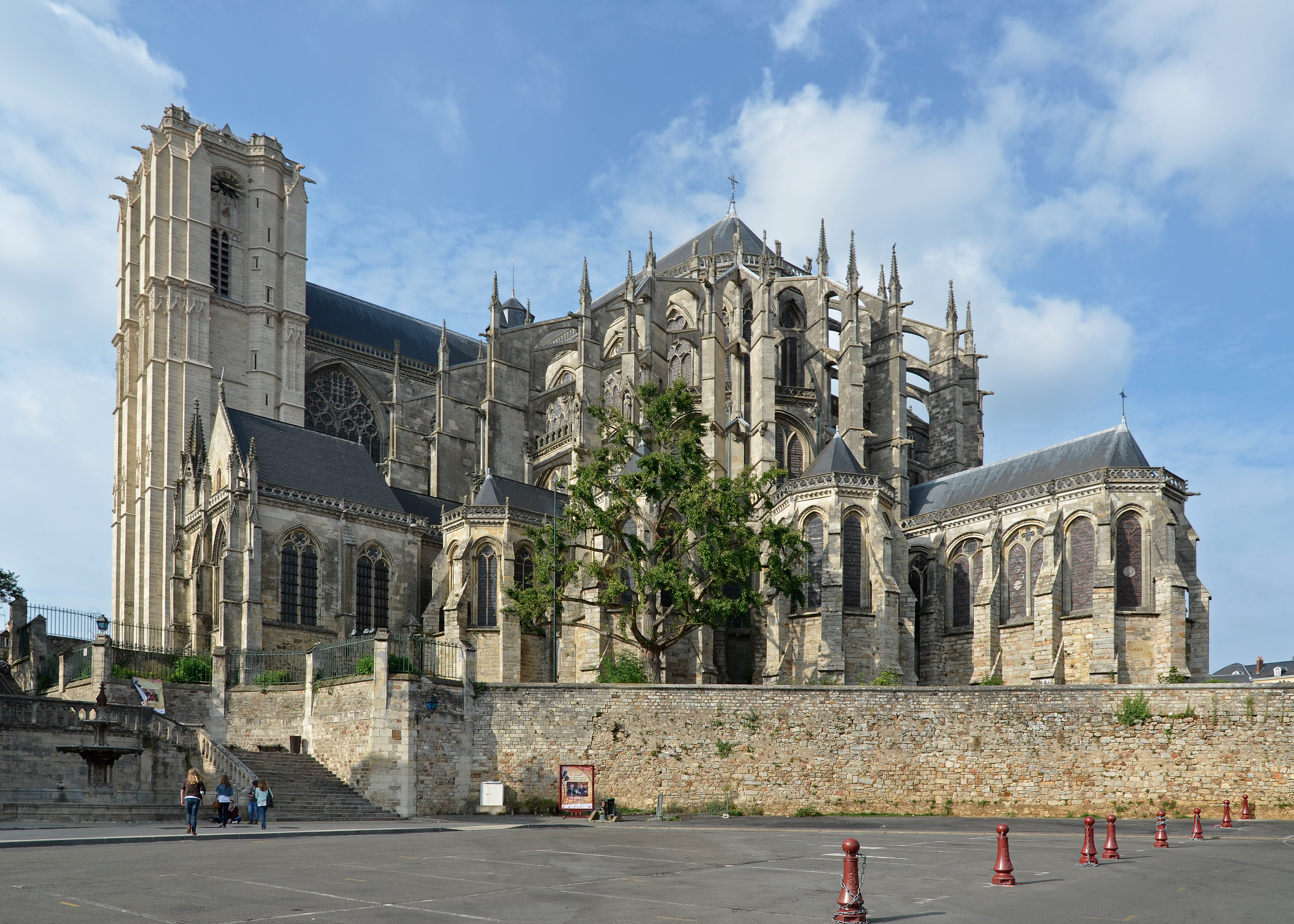
Apse of Cathedral of Le Mans

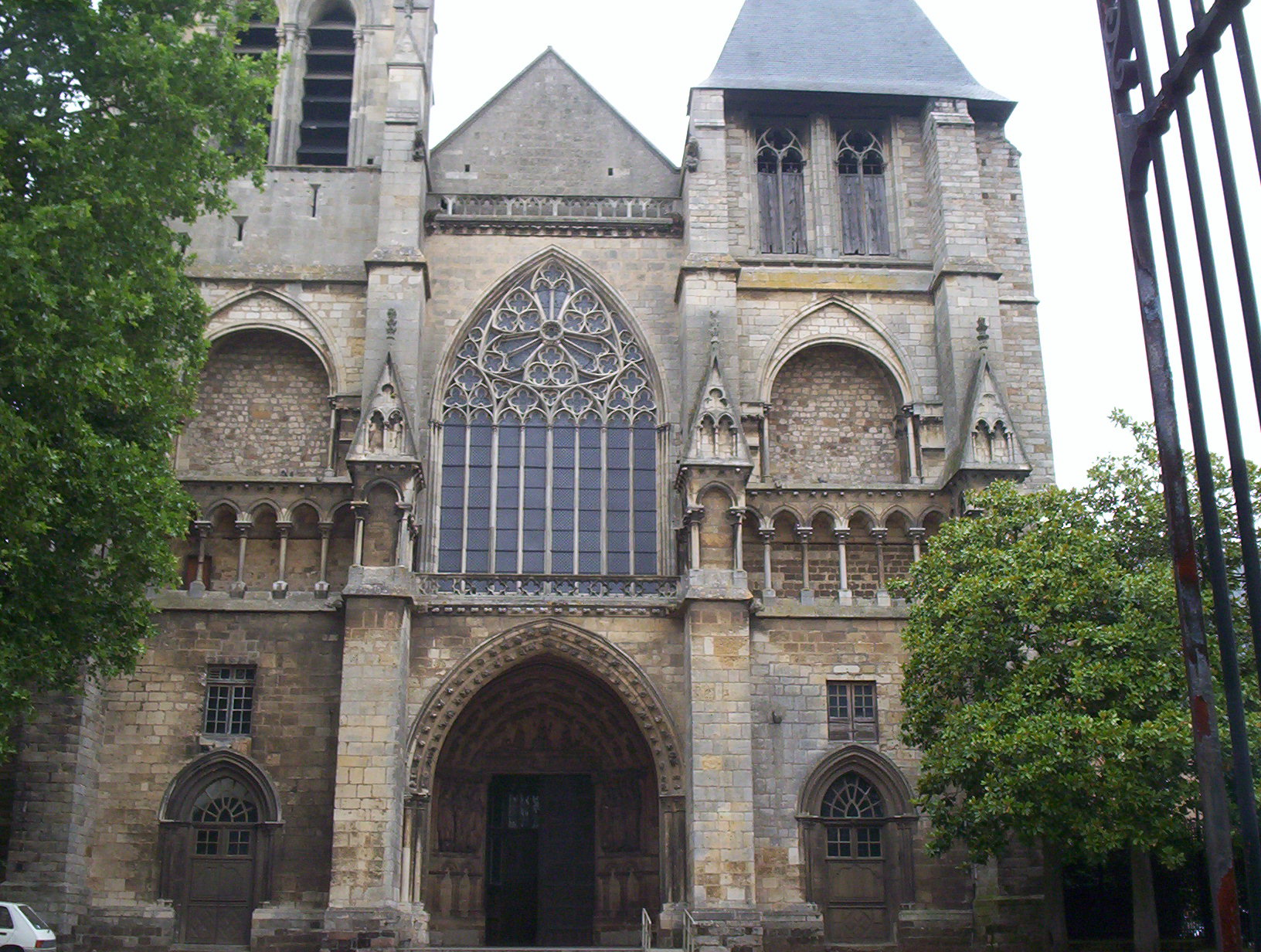
Notre-Dame de la Couture

A new and larger cathedral of St. Julian of Mans was begun under Bishop Vulgrin, but the choir collapsed and had to be rebuilt by Bishop Arnaud (1065-1081), and work continued for the rest of the century. There was a fire in Le Mans in 1134 which damaged the cathedral, and work had to be undertaken again. Between 1217 and 1254 a new choir was built, and the supposed relics of St. Julien placed in a splendid new home. The building exhibits specimens of all styles of architecture up to the fifteenth century, its thirteenth century choir being one of the most remarkable in France.

On 3 October 1230, Bishop Maurice (1215–1231) issued a charter in which he suppressed the offices of the six Archpriests who had served the diocese, and instituted six territorial Archdeacons in their place, all of whom were to be ordained priests within a year of their appointment: the Archdeacons of Mans, Sabolio, Lavalle, Castrildis, Montfort, and Passeyo. The arrangements were approved by the Roman Curia in 1232. The Chapter of the Cathedral had nine dignities: the Dean, the Cantor, the Scholasticus, and the six Archdeacons. There were thirty eight prebends and four semi-prebends. All the offices were in the gift of the bishop, except that of the Dean, who was elected by the Chapter.

In the winter of 1447/1448 southern Maine was under attack from the French armies of Charles VII. The English garrison in Le Mans was besieged, and on 16 March 1448 surrendered to the French.

The city of Le Mans was occupied and pillaged by the Huguenots between 3 April 1562 and 11 July 1562. Ideologically the cathedral was a special target, where anything smacking of Catholic practices and traditions was destroyed, but also the cathedral was a repository of precious gold, silver and jewels, and also the baser metals, bronze, brass and iron, which could be used for military purposes. Although the Huguenots were driven away by an approaching royal army, they continued to wreak havoc on the diocese and its churches and monasteries. On 5 May 1583 there was a fire in the cathedral, which damaged the vaults and destroyed the silver bell in the Choir.

The church of Notre-Dame de la Couture (originally dedicated to S. Peter) dates from the thirteenth, fourteenth, and fifteenth centuries, traces of earlier buildings having disappeared completely. The Abbey of Solesmes, founded by Geoffroy de Sablé in 993 and completed in 1095, has a thirteenth-century which is a veritable museum of sculptures of the end of the fifteenth and sixteenth centuries. Its "Entombment of Christ," in terracotta, is famous; the Mary Magdalen in the group, already celebrated even in the fifteenth century for its beauty attracted the attention of Richelieu, who thought of having it brought to Paris. Several sculptures depicting scenes in the life of the Virgin Mary form a series unique in France.

== Bishops of Le Mans ==
=== To 1000 ===
- St. Julianus (Julian)
- Turibius (see below)
- Pavatius, Pavacius
- Liborius (348-396); founded the Saint-Martin de Luché Church
- Romanus
- Victurius (450s and 60s)
- Turibius (490-496)
- Principius (497-511)
- Innocentius (532-43)
- Domnolus (560-81)
- Badigysel (581-586)
- Bertechramnus, Bertram, Bertran, Bertrand (587-623), founder of the Abbey of Notre-Dame de la Couture
- Hadoindus, Haduin, Harduin (623-54)
- Berecharius, Berarius, Beraire (655-70)
- St. Aldric (832-57).
- Robert (857-883/5), famous for the forgeries that appeared at Le Mans under him
- Aiglibert
- Mainardus
- Segenfredus, Seinfroy (d. 997)

=== 1000 to 1500 ===
- Avesgaud of Bellème (997-1036)
- Gervais de Château-du-Loir 1036–1055
- Wilgrin 1055–1064
- Arnaud 1067–1081
- Hoël 1085–1097
- Hildebert of Lavardin 1097–1125
- Guy d'Étampes 1126–1135
- Hugues de Saint-Calais 1135–1142
- Guillaume de Passavant 1142–1186
- Renaud 1186–1189
- Hamelin 1190–1214
- Nicolas 1214–1216
- Maurice 1215–1231 (or 1234)
- Geoffroi de Laval 1231–1234
- Geoffroi de Loudon 1234–1255
- Guillaume Roland 1256–1260
- Geoffroi Freslon 1260–1274
- Geoffroi D`Assé 1274–1277
- Jean de Toulay 1277–1294
- Pierre Le Royer 1294–1295
- Denis Benoit 1296–1298
- Robert de Clinchamp 1298–1309
- Pierre de Longueil 1312–1326
- Guy de Laval 1326–1339
- Geoffroi de La Chapelle 1339–1350
- Jean de Craon 1350–1355
- Michel de Briche 1355–1368
- Gonthier de Baignaux 1368–1385
- Pierre de Savoisy 1385–1398
- Adam Chatelain 1398–1439
- Jean d'Hierray (Jean D'Ansières, Jean de Jeriau) 1439–1451
- Martin Berruyer 1452–1467
- Thibaud de Luxembourg 1468–1474 (Cardinal)
- Philippe de Luxembourg 1477–1507

=== 1500-1800 ===
- Franz von Luxemburg 1507–1509 (also Bishop of Saint-Pons de Thomières)
- Philippe de Luxemburg 1509–1519 (second time)
- Louis de Bourbon 1519–1535 (Cardinal)
- René du Bellay 1535–1546
- Jean du Bellay 1542–1556 (Cardinal, 1 Nov 1542 Appointed – 27 Jul 1556 Resigned)
- Charles d'Angennes de Rambouillet 1559–1587 (Cardinal)
- Claude d'Angennes de Rambouillet 1588–1601
- Charles de Beaumanoir de Lavardin 1601–1637
- Emmeric-Marc de La Ferté 1637–1648
- Philibert-Emmanuel de Beaumanoir de Lavardin 1648–1671
- Louis de La Vergne de Monthirard de Tressan 1671–1712
- Pierre-Roger du Crévy 1712–1729
- Charles-Louis de Froulay de Tessé 1729–1767
- Louis-André de Grimaldi 1767–1777 (19 Apr 1767 Appointed – 16 Oct 1777 Appointed Bishop of Noyon)
- François-Gaspard de Jouffroy de Gonsans 1777–1790
  - Jacques-Guillaume-René-François Prudhomme de La Boussinière 1791–1793 (Constitutional Bishop of Sarthe)

=== From 1800 ===
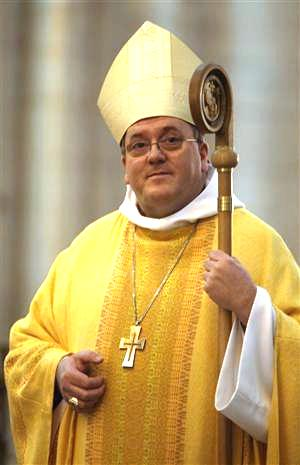
Bishop Yves Le Saux

- Johann Michael Josef von Pidoll de Quitenbach (9 April 1802 Appointed – 23 November 1819 Died)
- Claude-Madeleine de La Myre-Mory (5 December 1819 Appointed – 22 December 1828 Resigned)
- Philippe-Marie-Thérèse-Guy Carron (16 April 1829 Appointed – 27 August 1833 Died)
- Jean-Baptiste Bouvier (22 November 1833 Appointed – 29 December 1854 Died)
- Jean-Jacques Nanquette (30 August 1855 Appointed – 19 November 1861 Died)
- Charles-Jean Fillion (14 January 1862 Appointed – 28 July 1874 Died)
- Hector-Albert Chaulet d'Outremont (14 September 1874 Appointed – 14 September 1884 Died)
- Guillaume-Marie-Joseph Labouré (31 December 1884 Appointed – 13 June 1893 Appointed Archbishop of Rennes)
- Charles-Joseph-Louis-Abel Gilbert (29 January 1894 Appointed – August 1897 Resigned)
- Marie-Prosper-Adolphe de Bonfils (22 March 1898 Appointed – 2 June 1912 Died)
- Raymond-Marie-Turiaf de La Porte (12 August 1912 Appointed – 30 November 1917 Resigned)
- Georges-François-Xavier-Marie Grente (30 January 1918 Appointed – 4 May 1959 Died)
- Paul-Léon-Jean Chevalier (4 May 1959 Succeeded – 28 October 1971 Retired)
- Bernard-Pierre-Edmond Alix (28 October 1971 Succeeded – 13 August 1981 Resigned)
- Georges Edmond Robert Gilson (13 August 1981 Appointed – 2 August 1996 Appointed Archbishop of Sens)
- Jacques Maurice Faivre (29 July 1997 Appointed – 3 July 2008 Resigned)
- Yves Le Saux (21 November 2000 Appointed – 27 June 2022 Appointed Bishop of Annecy)
- Jean-Pierre Vuillemin (3 April 2023 – present)

== La Flèche ==
The Jesuit Collège Henri IV de La Flèche, in the town of La Flèche, founded in 1603 by Henry IV, enjoyed a great reputation for a century and a half, and the Marshal de Guébriant, Descartes, Marin Mersenne, Prince Eugene of Savoy, and Pierre Séguier (brother of the Chancellor of France Antoine de Séguier) were all numbered among its students.

The Dominican convent of Le Mans, begun (according to local myth) about 1219 and, according to the claim, during the lifetime of St. Dominic, was able to begin its construction thanks to the benefactions of one 'John of Troezen', Count of Maine, an English nobleman. Louis IX of France contributed personally to the completion of the works. The house was far less wealthy when the theologian Nicolas Coeffeteau, who died in 1623, began his career as a Dominican by taking his vows at Le Mans in 1588, and who later became Bishop of Marseille. The French Revolution swept away this convent.

== Saints in Le Mans ==
The diocese honours in a special manner as saints: Peregrinus, Marcoratus, and Viventianus, martyrs; Hilary of Oizé, nephew of St. Hilary of Poitiers (in the fifth century); Bommer, Almirus, Leonard, and Ulphace, hermits; Gault, Front, and Brice, solitaries and previously monks of Micy; Fraimbault, hermit, founder of a small monastery in the valley of Gabrone; Calais, hermit and founder of the monastery of Anisole, from whom the town of Saint-Calais took its name; Laumer, successor to St. Calais; Guingalois or Guénolé, founder of the monastery of Landevenec in Brittany, whose relics are venerated at Château du Loir.

All in the sixth century: Rigomer, monk at Souligné, and Ténestine, his penitent, both of whom were acquitted before Childebert, through the miracle of Palaiseau, of accusations made against them (d. about 560); Longis, solitary, and Onofletta, his penitent; Siviard, Abbot of Anisole and author of the life of St. Calais (d. 681); the Irish St. Cérota, and her mistress Osmana, daughter of a king of Ireland, died a solitary near St-Brieuc, in the seventh century; Ménélé, and Savinian (d. about 720), natives of Précigné, who repaired to Auvergne to found the Abbey of Menat, on the ruins of the hermitage where St. Calais had formerly lived.

There is also a particular devotion in Le Mans to Ralph de La Fustaye, who was a twelfth century monk, a disciple of Robert d'Arbrissel the founder of Fontevrault Abbey and missionary to prostitutes; Ralph was founder of the Abbey of St. Sulpice, in the forest of Nid de Merle in the Diocese of Rennes in Brittany. Both were Bretons; neither was connected to Le Mans; neither became a saint.

The famous founder of the Trappists, Abbot de Rancé, made his novitiate at the Cistercian Perseigne Abbey in the Diocese of Le Mans, though his subsequent career was entirely elsewhere: his uncle was Archbishop of Tours, where he was appointed Archdeacon.

Also there may be mentioned as natives of the diocese, Urbain Grandier, the notorious curé of Loudun, who was tortured and burned to death for sorcery in 1634; and Mersenne, the Minim (d. 1648), philosopher and mathematician and friend of Descartes and Pascal.

Pilgrimages to Notre-Dame de Toutes Aides at Saint-Remy du Plein, Notre-Dame de La Faigne at Pontvallain, and Notre-Dame des Bois at La Suze, date back to primitive times. The chapel of Notre Dame de Torcé, erected in the sixth century, has been much frequented by pilgrims since the eleventh century. Besides these places of pilgrimage may be mentioned those of Notre-Dame de Labit at Domfront, and of Notre-Dame du Chene at Vion, near Sablé, which can be traced to 1494. It was established in the place where in former times Urban II had preached the First Crusade.

=== Cult of St. Scholastica ===
During the episcopate of Berecharius (655-70) the body of St. Scholastica was brought from the monastery of Fleury to Le Mans; the monastery erected to shelter the remains of the saint was destroyed by the Northmen in the second half of the ninth century. A portion of her relics was brought in 874 by the Empress Richilda to the monastery of Juvigny les Dames. The remaining portion was conveyed to the interior of the citadel and placed in the apse of the collegiate church of St. Pierre la Cour, which served the counts of Maine as a domestic chapel. The fire that destroyed Le Mans, 3 September 1134, also consumed the shrine of St. Scholastica, and only a few calcined bones were left. On 11 July 1464, a confraternity was erected in honour of St. Scholastica, and on 23 November 1876, she was officially proclaimed patroness of Le Mans.

== See also ==
- Catholic Church in France

== Bibliography ==
=== Reference works ===
- Gams, Pius Bonifatius (1873). Series episcoporum Ecclesiae catholicae: quotquot innotuerunt a beato Petro apostolo. Ratisbon: Typis et Sumptibus Georgii Josephi Manz. pp. 562–563. (Use with caution; obsolete)
- Eubel, Conradus, ed. (1913). Hierarchia catholica, Tomus 1 (second ed.). Münster: Libreria Regensbergiana. (in Latin) pp. 180–181.
- Eubel, Conradus, ed. (1914). Hierarchia catholica, Tomus 2 (second ed.). Münster: Libreria Regensbergiana. (in Latin) p. 124.
- Gulik, Guilelmus (1923). Eubel, Conradus (ed.). Hierarchia catholica, Tomus 3 (second ed.). Münster: Libreria Regensbergiana. p. 162.
- Gauchat, Patritius (Patrice) (1935). Hierarchia catholica IV (1592-1667). Münster: Libraria Regensbergiana. pp. 145.
- Ritzler, Remigius; Sefrin, Pirminus (1952). Hierarchia catholica medii et recentis aevi V (1667-1730). Patavii: Messagero di S. Antonio. pp. 154.
- Ritzler, Remigius; Sefrin, Pirminus (1958). Hierarchia catholica medii et recentis aevi VI (1730-1799). Patavii: Messagero di S. Antonio. p. 159.

=== Studies ===
- Barton, Richard Ewing (2004). Lordship in the County of Maine, C. 890-1160. Woodbridge Suffolk UK: Boydell Press. ISBN 978-1-84383-086-3.
- Bondonnet, Jean (1651). Les vies des évêques du Mans (in French). Paris: Edme Martin.
- Bouchard, Constance Brittain (15 September 2014). Rewriting Saints and Ancestors: Memory and Forgetting in France, 500-1200. University of Pennsylvania Press. pp. 66–77. ISBN 978-0-8122-4636-0.
- Bouttier, Michel (2000). La Cathédrale du Mans (in French). Le Mans: Éditions de la Reinette. ISBN 978-2-913566-03-3.
- Broussillon, Bertrand de, ed. (1900). Archives historiques du Maine, I: Cartulaire de l' Évêché du Mans (936-1790) (in French and Latin). Société historique de la Province du Maine.
- Busson, G.; Ledru, A., eds. (1901). Archives historiques du Maine, II: Actus Pontificum Cenomannis in urbe degentium (in French and Latin). Mans.
- Busson, G.; Ledru, A., eds. (1906). Archives historiques du Maine, VII: Nécrologe-Obituaire de la Cathédrale du Mans (in French and Latin). Mans.
- Charles, Robert; Froger, Louis (1889). Gesta domni Aldrici: Cenomannicae urbis episcopi, a discipulis suis (in French and Latin). Mamers: G. Fleury et A. Dangin. p. 224.
- Duchesne, Louis (1910). Fastes épiscopaux de l'ancienne Gaule: II. L'Aquitaine et les Lyonnaises. Paris: Fontemoing. second edition (in French) pp. 312–344.
- Goffart, Walter A. (1967). The Le Mans Forgeries: A Chapter from the History of Church Property in the Ninth Century. Harvard University Press. p. 240. ISBN 978-0-674-51875-9.
- Goffart, Walter (1967). "Le Mans, St. Scholastica, and the Literary Tradition of the Translation of St. Benedict". Revue bénédictine. 77 (1–2): 107–141. doi:10.1484/J.RB.4.00665.
- Autrefois chez nous : Les histoires, les coutumes, les curiosités de nos villages : Luché-Pringé, Mareil-sur-Loir, Saint-Jean-de-la-Motte, Thorée-les-Pins (in French). Preface by Abbé Georges Guillaume. Association Autrefois chez nous. 1998. ISBN 2-9513033-0-0.
- Havet, Julien (1893). "Études merovingiennes, VII: Les actes des évêques du Mans". Bibliothèque de l'École des chartes. 54: 597–692. doi:10.3406/bec.1893.447748.
- Ledru, Ambroise (1895). La Cathédrale du Mans (Saint-Julieu) Atravers la Cité (in French). Le Mans: Leguicheux impr.
- Longnon, Auguste (1903). Recueil des historiens de la France: Pouillés (in French and Latin). Vol. Tome III: Pouillés de la Province de Tours. Paris: Imprimerie nationale.
- Mussat, André (1981). La Cathédrale du Mans (in French). Paris: Berger-Levrault. ISBN 978-2-7013-0426-7.
- Piolin, Paul (1851). Histoire de l'église du Mans (in French). Vol. Tome I. Paris: Julien, Lanier et cie.
- Piolin, Paul (1854). Histoire de l'église du Mans (in French). Vol. Tome II. Paris: Julien, Lanier.
- Piolin, Paul (1856). Histoire de l'église du Mans (in French). Vol. Tome III. Paris: Julien, Lanier.
- Piolin, Paul (1858). Histoire de l'église du Mans (in French). Vol. Tome IV. Paris: Julien, Lanier.
- Piolin, Paul (1861). Histoire de l'église du Mans (in French). Vol. Tome V. Paris: Lecoffre.
- Piolin, Paul (1863). Histoire de l'église du Mans (in French). Vol. Tome VI. Paris: Julien, Lanier, Cosnard et Ce.
- Robert, Charles; Froger, Louis, eds. (1889). Gesta domni Aldrici: Cenomannicae urbis episcopi, a discipulis suis (in French and Latin). Mamers: G. Fleury et A. Dangin.
- Sainte-Marthe, Denis de; Hauréau, Barthélemy (1856). Gallia Christiana: in provincias ecclesiasticas distributa... de provincia Toronensi (in Latin). Vol. Tomus quartus decimus (XIV). Paris: Coignard. pp. 338–542, Instrumenta, pp. 99–142.
- Triger, Robert (1889). L'année 1789 au Mans et dans le Haut-Maine (in French). Mamers: G. Fleury et A. Dangin.
- Triger, Robert (1899). La prise du Mans par les chouans le 15 octobre 1799 (in French). Mamers: Fleury & Dangin. ISBN 979-10-208-0047-3.
- Weidemann, Margarete (2002). Geschichte des Bistums Le Mans von der Spätantike bis zur Karolingerzeit (in German and Latin). Vol. 3 vols. Mainz: Verlag des Römisch-Germanischen Zentralmuseums in Kommission bei Habelt. ISBN 978-3-88467-077-4.
- Woodcock, Philippa (2011), "Was original best? Refitting the Churches of the Diocese of Le Mans, 1562-1598," Chris King; Duncan Sayer, eds. (2011). The Archaeology of Post-medieval Religion. Woodbridge Suffolk UK: Boydell Press. pp. 39–52. ISBN 978-1-84383-693-3.
