= Aldric of Le Mans =

Saint Aldric
- Born: c. 800
- Died: 7 January 856. Le Mans
- Venerated in: Roman Catholicism

Saint Aldric (c. 800 – 7 January 856) was Bishop of Le Mans in the time of Louis the Pious.

== Life ==
Aldric was born into a noble family, of partly Saxon and partly Bavarian extraction, about the year 800. At the age of twelve he was placed by his father in the court of Charlemagne, in the household of his son Louis the Pious at Aix la Chapelle. Aldric was highly esteemed by both monarchs, but at the age of twenty-one he withdrew to Metz and became a priest. He was given a prebend at St. Stephen's. He was then recalled to the court by Louis, who took him as his chaplain and the guide of his conscience.

Nine years after his ordination, Aldric was made Bishop of Le Mans. He was consecrated on 22 December. The emperor arrived at Mans three days after, and kept the Christmas holy-days with him. He was a learned and pious prelate, devoted to the poor and to the religious interests of his Diocese. Apart from being conspicuously virtuous, he showed a practical turn in building aqueducts and ransoming captives, as well as building new churches and restoring monasteries.

In the civil wars which followed the death of Louis, Aldric's loyalty to Charles the Bald resulted in his expulsion from his see, and he withdrew to Rome. Gregory IV reinstated him. In 836, as an emissary of the Council of Aix la Chapelle Aldric visited Pepin I, who was then King of Aquitaine, with Erchenrad, Bishop of Paris, and persuaded Pepin to order that all the possessions of the Church which had been seized by his followers should be restored.

Aldric took part in the Councils of Paris in 846 and Tours in 849. The two last years of his life he was confined to his bed by a palsy. He died at Le Mans on 7 January 856 and was buried in the church of Saint Vincent, having been bishop for twenty-four years.

He was succeeded by Robert (bishop of Le Mans).

== Relevant works ==
- Actus Pontificum Cenomannis (in urbe degentium), compiled during Aldric's episcopate.
  - ed. Margarete Weidemann, Geschichte des Bistums Le Mans von der Spätantike bis zur Karolingerzeit: Actus Pontificum Cenomannis in urbe degentium und Gesta Aldrici. 3 vols. Mainz, 2000.
- Gesta (Domni) Aldrici, which relates how Aldric translated the bodies of the saints and former bishops of Le Mans: Julianus, Turibius, Pavatius, Romanus, Liborius and Hadoindus to his cathedral.
  - ed. Margarete Weidemann, Geschichte des Bistums Le Mans von der Spätantike bis zur Karolingerzeit: Actus Pontificum Cenomannis in urbe degentium und Gesta Aldrici. 3 vols. Mainz, 2000.
