= Covenham St Bartholomew =

Village in Lincolnshire, England

Coordinates: 53.434674°N 0.011001°E

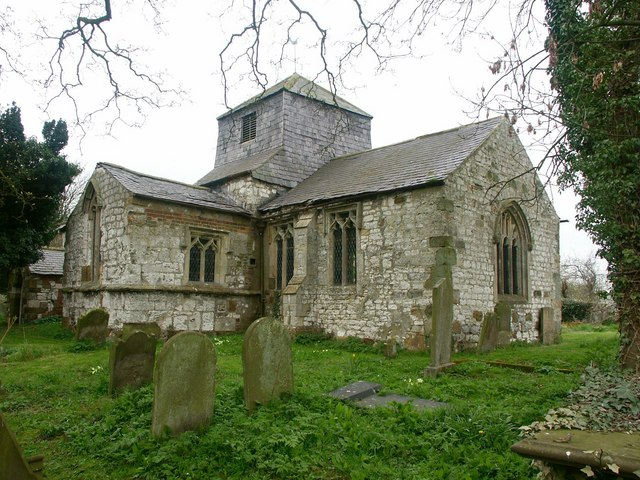
- Church of St Bartholomew, Covenham St Bartholomew

- Location within Lincolnshire
- Population: 192 (2011)
- OS grid reference: TF336949
  - London: 130 mi (210 km) S
- District: East Lindsey
- Shire county: Lincolnshire
- Region: East Midlands
- Country: England
- Sovereign state: United Kingdom
- Post town: Louth
- Postcode district: LN11
- Police: Lincolnshire
- Fire: Lincolnshire
- Ambulance: East Midlands
- UK Parliament: Louth and Horncastle

Covenham St Bartholomew is a village in the East Lindsey district of Lincolnshire, England. It is situated approximately 5 miles (8 km) north from Louth. The southern part of the village adjoins Covenham St Mary; both villages are ecclesiastical parishes and part of the civil parish of Covenham.

The prime meridian passes to the west of Covenham St Bartholomew.

The Grade II listed Anglican parish church is dedicated to St Bartholomew. The church is mainly in Decorated style, and formerly cruciform in plan before losing its north transept. It has a low central bell-tower. On the floor of the church is a monumental brass with an effigy of Sir John Skypwyth, 1415. St Bartholomew's was repaired and re-seated in 1863 The manor of Covenham was an endowment to Covenham Priory, which itself was given by William I to the abbey of St Carileph at Le Mans. In 1303 the priory became unprofitable and was sold to Kirkstead Abbey.

The churchyard of St Bartholomews is the last resting place of WO Michal Czekański (Service number 703049) (b. 16 Sep 1915, d. 1 Apr 1971). Czekański left Poland during the Second World War and joined the Polish Air Force under RAF Command in 1942 as an air gunner. He served on 305 and 300 Polish Bomber Sqns. After the war he settled in Covenham St Mary until his death.

In the 19th century Covenham held Wesleyan, Primitive and Free Methodist chapels.

Other Grade II listed buildings within the village are Haith's Farm House and Mill House.

To the north-east of the village is a large reservoir with public access.

== Covenham St Mary ==
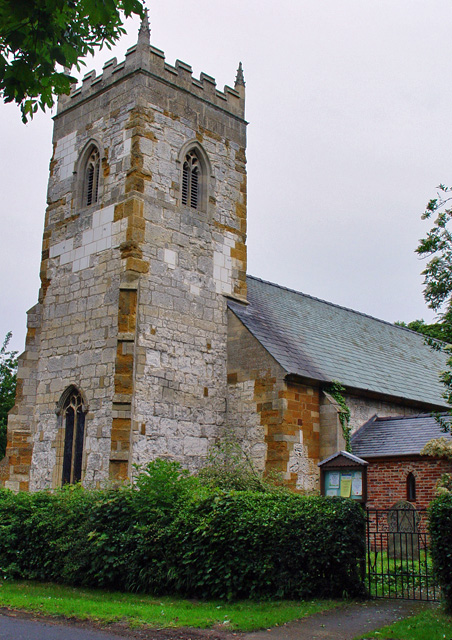
Church of St Mary, Covenham St Mary

The Covenham St Mary Grade II* listed parish church is dedicated to St Mary. It is entirely of Decorated style, but was considerably restored in 1901.
