= Badigysel =

Bishop of the Le Mans diocese (581-586)

Badigysel (French: Baudegisile) was a bishop of the diocese of Le Mans in the 6th century. He served as bishop from 581 to 586, when he died.

== Wife and daughter ==
Gregory of Tours recorded that bishop Badigysel had a wife and daughter who survived him following his death. He recounted that Chuppa, a former constable of the late king Chilperic I, attempted to force the daughter to become his bride. Magnatrude, the mother, gathered together a group of armed men and successfully fought off Chuppa.

Magnatrude also got into a dispute with Bertechramnus the succeeding bishop of Le Mans about property following her husband's death. Magnatrude succeeded in getting an estate given to her from the bishopric's lands.
