= Covenham Priory =

Priory in Lincolnshire, England

Coordinates: 53°26′25″N 0°02′10″E

Covenham Priory was a priory in Covenham St Bartholomew, Lincolnshire, England.

The manor, which formed the endowment of the priory of Covenham, was granted in 1082 by William the Conqueror to the abbot and convent of Saint Calais, Le Mans, at the request of the Bishop of Durham a former a monk of that abbey. A small Benedictine priory was built soon after, but it is probable that there were never more than two monks, or perhaps only one to take charge of the estate. By 1303 the cell had become so unprofitable it was sold to the abbot and convent of Kirkstead.
