= Larmer =

Larmer is a surname. Notable people with the surname include:

- James Larmer (1808 or 1809–1886), English-born surveyor of New South Wales
- Jeff Larmer (born 1962), Canadian ice hockey player, brother of Steve
- Miles Larmer (born 1969), British historian
- Steve Larmer (born 1961), Canadian ice hockey player

== See also ==
- Larmer Tree Gardens, garden in Wiltshire, England
- Larmer Tree Festival, music and arts festival in England
- Larmer Bay, British Virgin Islands - see Larmer Bay ruin
- Laumer, a surname and given name
