= Laumer =

Laumer is a given name and surname. Notable people with the name include:

- Keith Laumer (1925–1993), American science fiction writer
- March Laumer (1923–2000), American writer, brother of Keith
- Lomer (saint) (died c. 590), Catholic saint also called "Laumer"

== See also ==
- Larmer, a surname
