= Bommer =

Bommer is a surname. Notable people with the surname include:

- Alois and Anna Bommer, German couple who faced a military tribunal at Metz along with their three daughters after World War II
- Elisa Caroline Bommer (1832–1910), Belgian botanist specialising in mycology
- Rudi Bommer (born 1957), former German footballer and football manager
- Nadine Bommer (born 1968), American-Israeli contemporary dance choreographer, teacher, and artistic director

== See also ==
- Bommer Weiher, lake near Alterswilen in the municipality of Kemmental, Canton of Thurgau, Switzerland
