= Notre-Dame de la Couture, Le Mans =

Church in Le Mans, France

Coordinates: 48.0022°N 0.2000°E

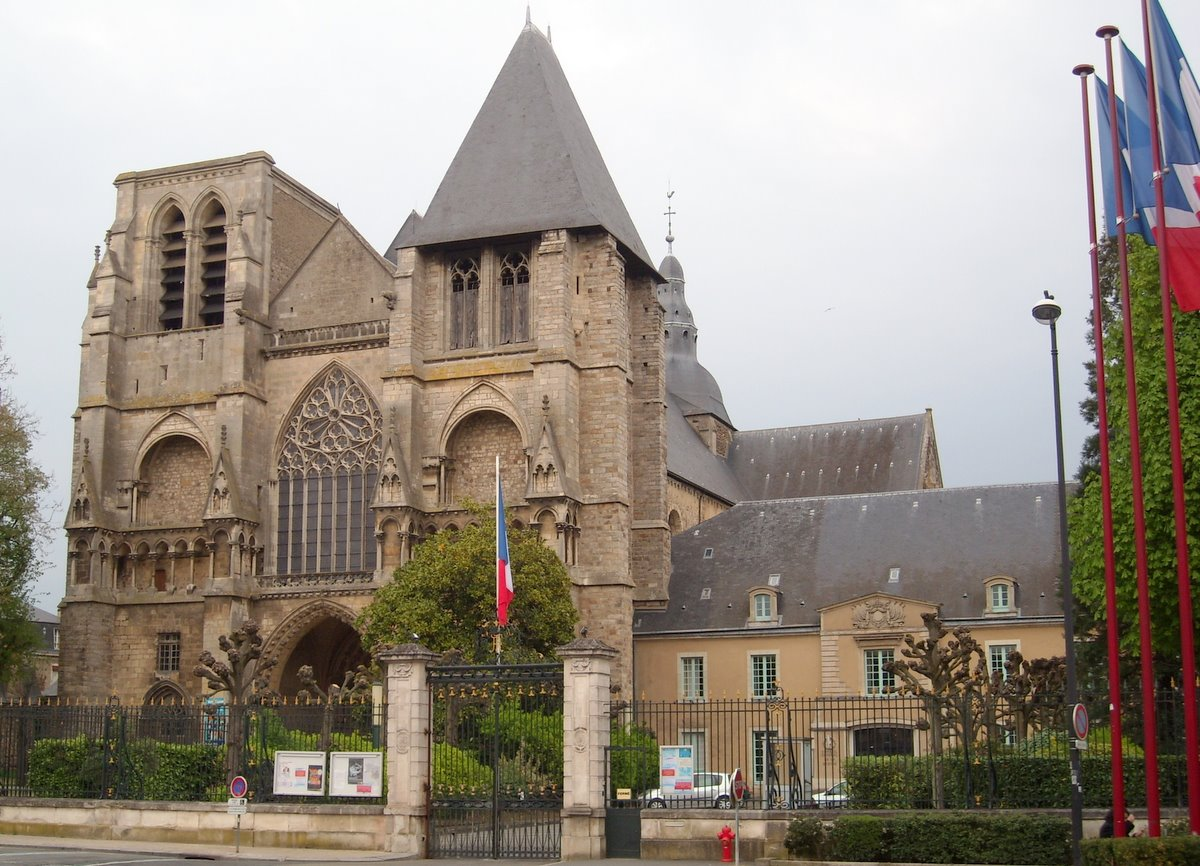

Notre-Dame de la Couture (église de la Couture) is a church in Le Mans. Formerly the abbey church of Saint-Pierre de la Couture Abbey, it is in the centre of the present-day town. It mainly dates to the 12th century - it shows many similarities to Le Mans Cathedral and Angers Cathedral, both built at about the same time. Its large westwork is framed by two differently-designed towers and other former abbey buildings abut the church, with the prefecture for Sarthe now occupying those on the south side. It was classed as a historic monument in 1840.

== History ==
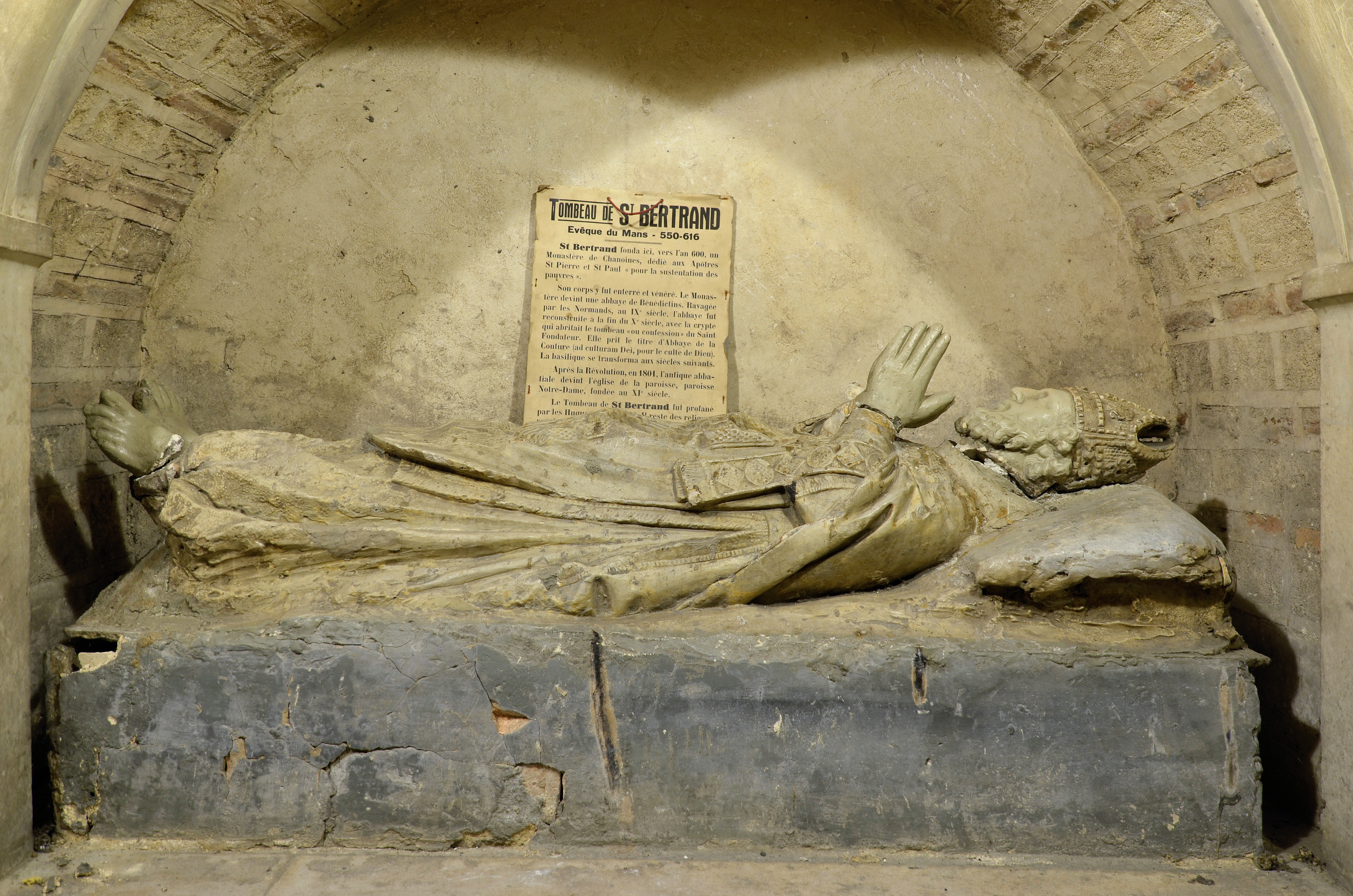
Tomb of Bertechramnus in the crypt.

The abbey was founded just after 605 thanks to the generosity of bishop Bertechramnus, a supporter of Chlothar II. Then sited near Le Mans but outside its city walls, its abbey church was then known as the 'basilique Saints-Pierre-et-Paul' or basilica of Saint Peter and Saint Paul. In his will of 616 Bertechramnus gave "the land of Couture" to the monastery, giving the abbey and the church its present name. In 865 and 866, the Bretons and Normans both sacked Le Mans and the abbey was pillaged and partially destroyed. It was restored and rebuilt around 1000 and the church was renamed Saint-Pierre de la Couture by bishop Sigefroi, who became a monk in the abbey and partly left abbot Gauzbert to take on his duties. The remains of the original church can still be seen 18 metres up in the south cloister.

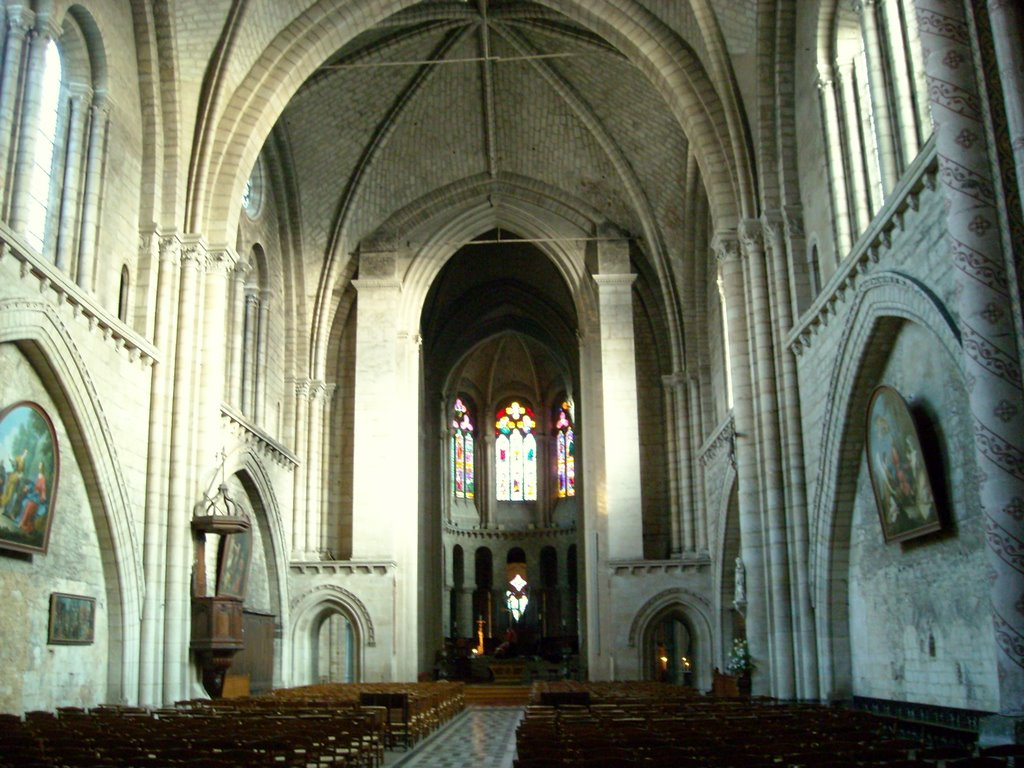
Steep rib vaults of Angevin Gothic

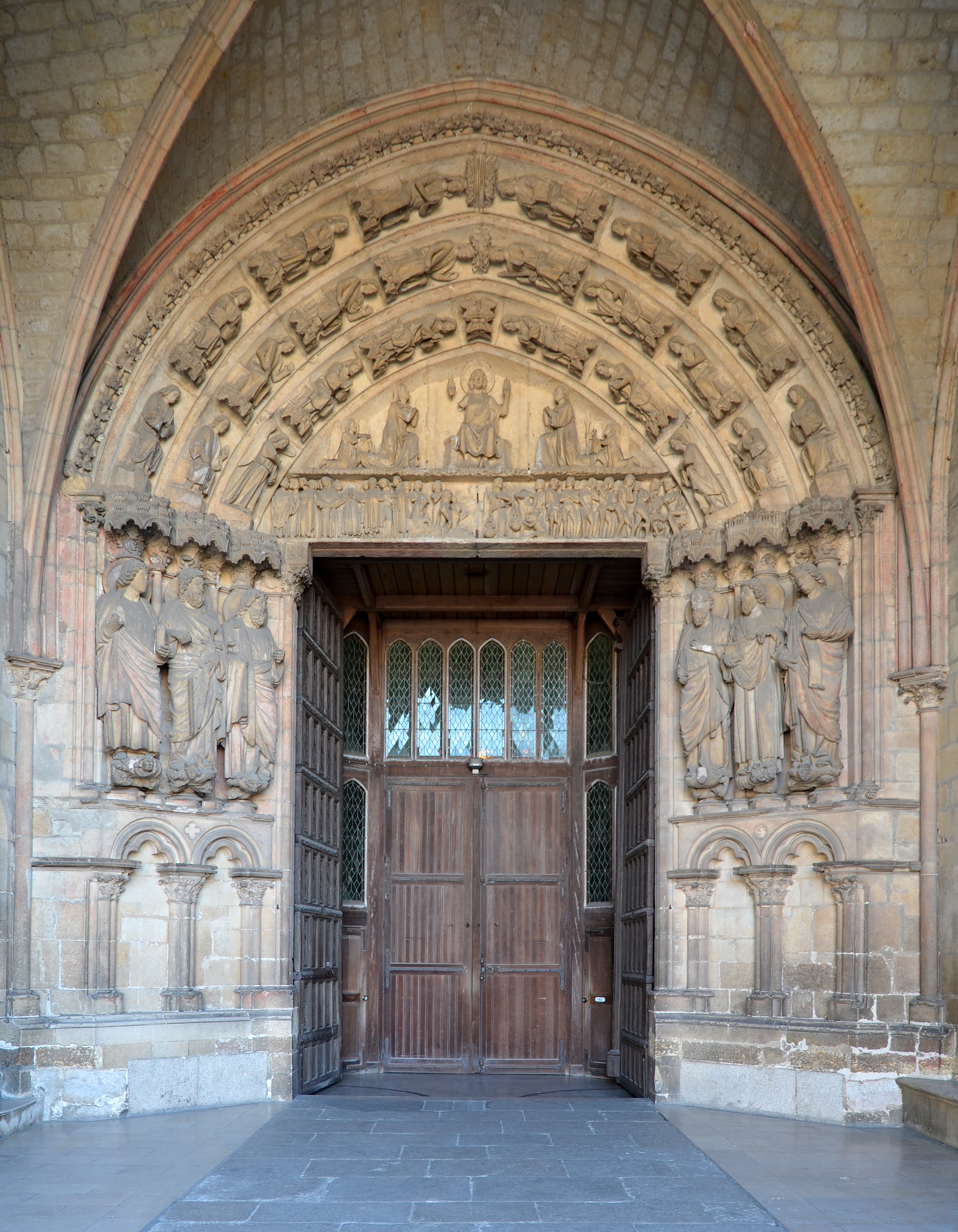
Entrance to the west front, with a 13th century tympanum showing the Last Judgement.

For most of the 11th century the church and the town experienced relative peace and prosperity, notably under the control and influence of abbot Anselin. After his death in 1072 the situation became harder and his successor abbot Renaud faced several challenges. Building work on the church continued, forming an aisled nave, a transept and an ambulatory choir opening onto five side chapels. All but one of these chapels are now lost - the surviving, that dedicated to St Joseph, is located to the south of the choir. Another survivor from this era is what now forms the exterior north wall. Like the nave of Le Mans Cathedral, the nave of this era at Notre-Dame was made up of fourteen spans separated by columns and double arches. In its first span on the north side is a late 11th century statue of Christ.

A major fire in 1180 destroyed much of Le Mans and severely damaged Notre-Dame. The latter was rebuilt during the 12th century, showing the artistic originality developed by the Plantagenet court. The choir include ogive vaults and the former building was completely redesigned, trying to make the maximum use of space in the old building. Between each window is a caryatid resting on a half-column. These show figures from the Old and New Testaments and may be the first of their kind, before the Plantagenets popularized them throughout their lands in Maine and Anjou - previously column-statues were more common in doorways than interiors.

The nave is 42 metres long and has three spans on a square plan, drawing on Angers Cathedral. At 22 metres long the main vaults are longer than the middle vaults of 16 metres. Some columns are more than 5 metres high although the exterior walls have been thickened to enable this. Unusually the central nave has twin windows topped by an oculus. The two west towers date to the 13th century. The porch originally had a triple arcade with a central column showing Christ, but that column was destroyed in the 19th century and never rebuilt due to difficulties finding matching stone of high enough quality - part of the lintel is also missing. The first sculptures were carved in 1245 and many on the porch survive in good condition, including two angels, four prophets and eight virgins.

== Gallery ==
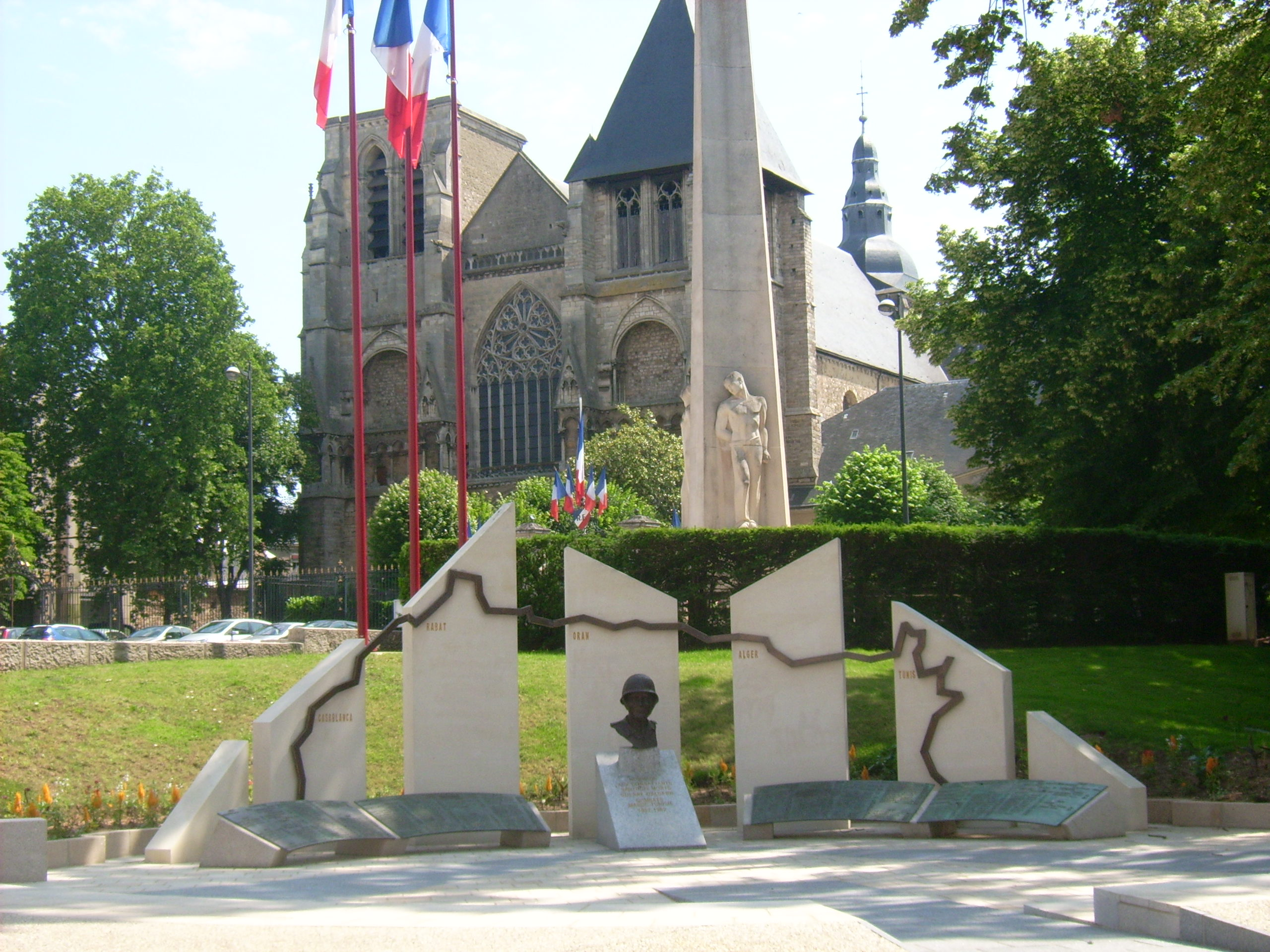
View from the monument on place Aristide Briant

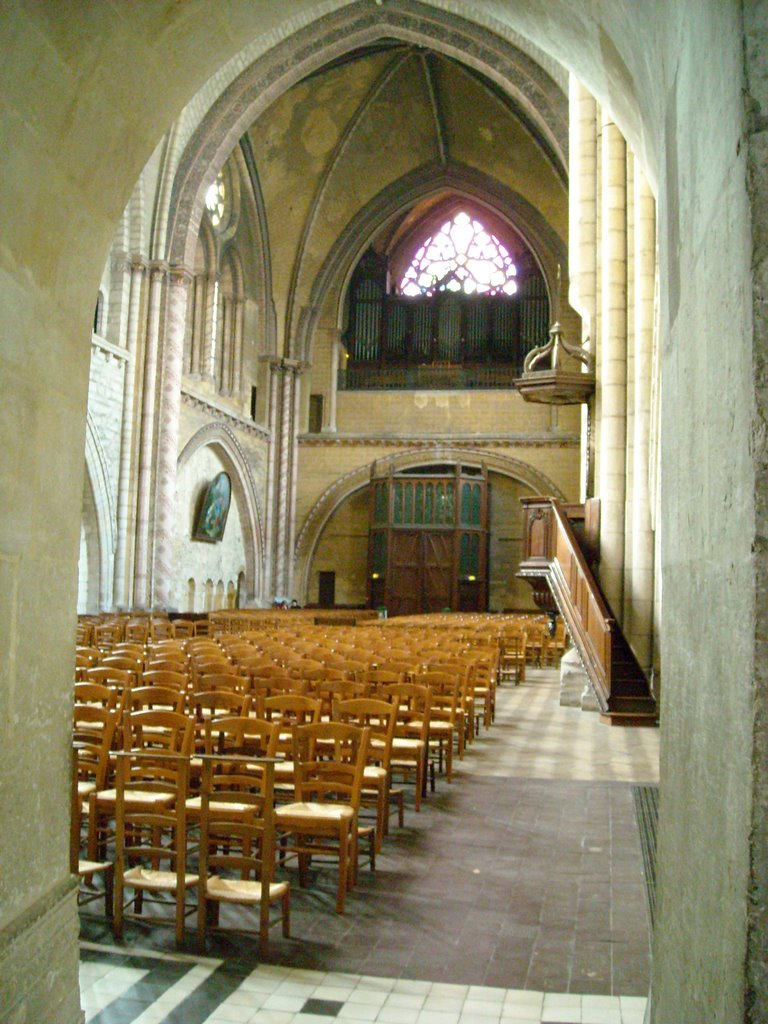
Nave and organ

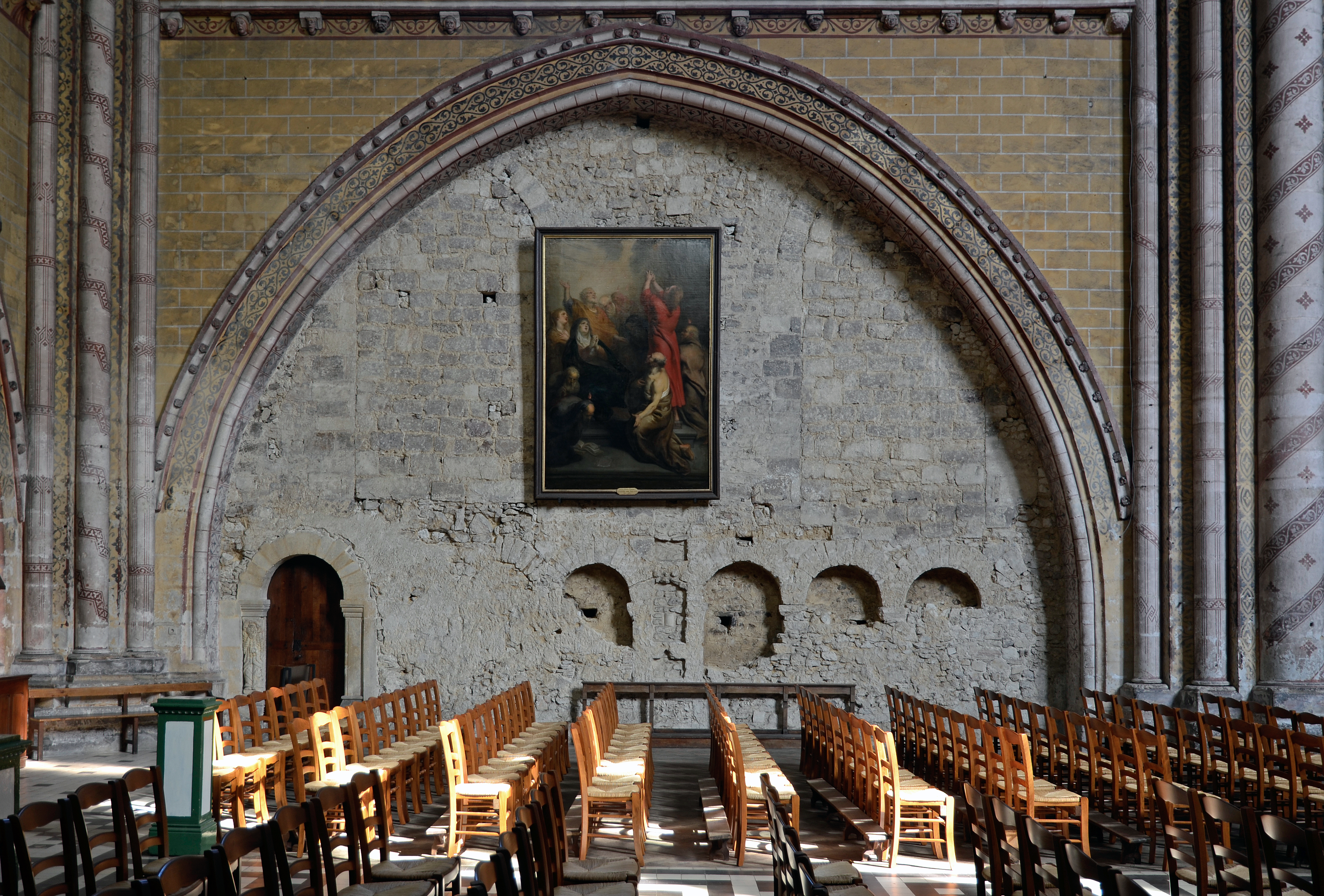
One of the nave aisles

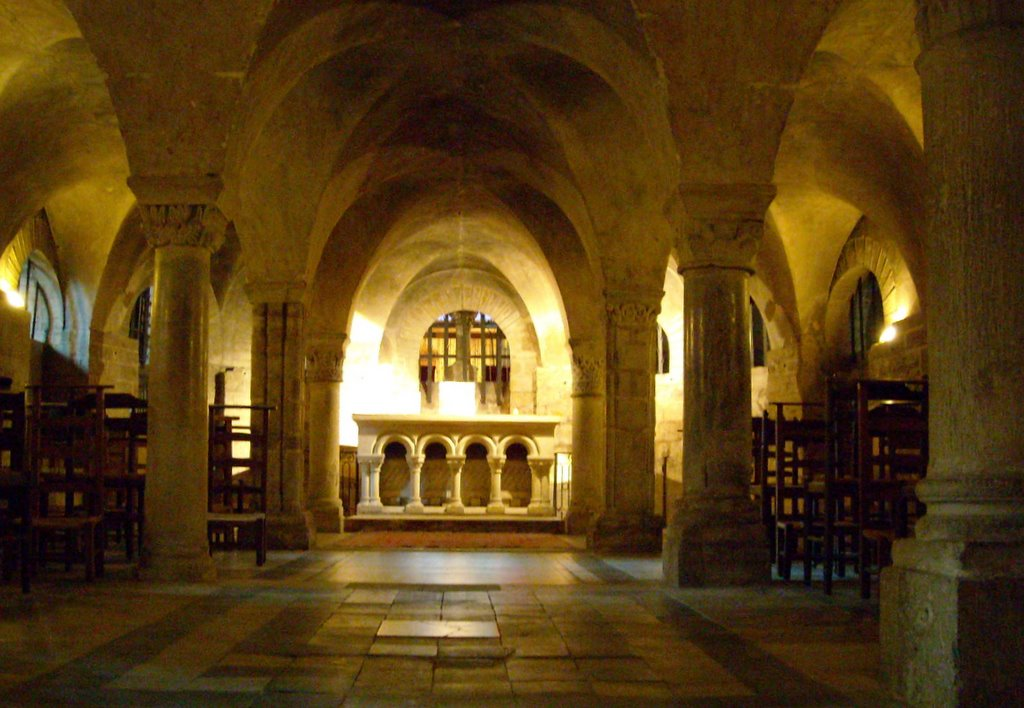
Crypt

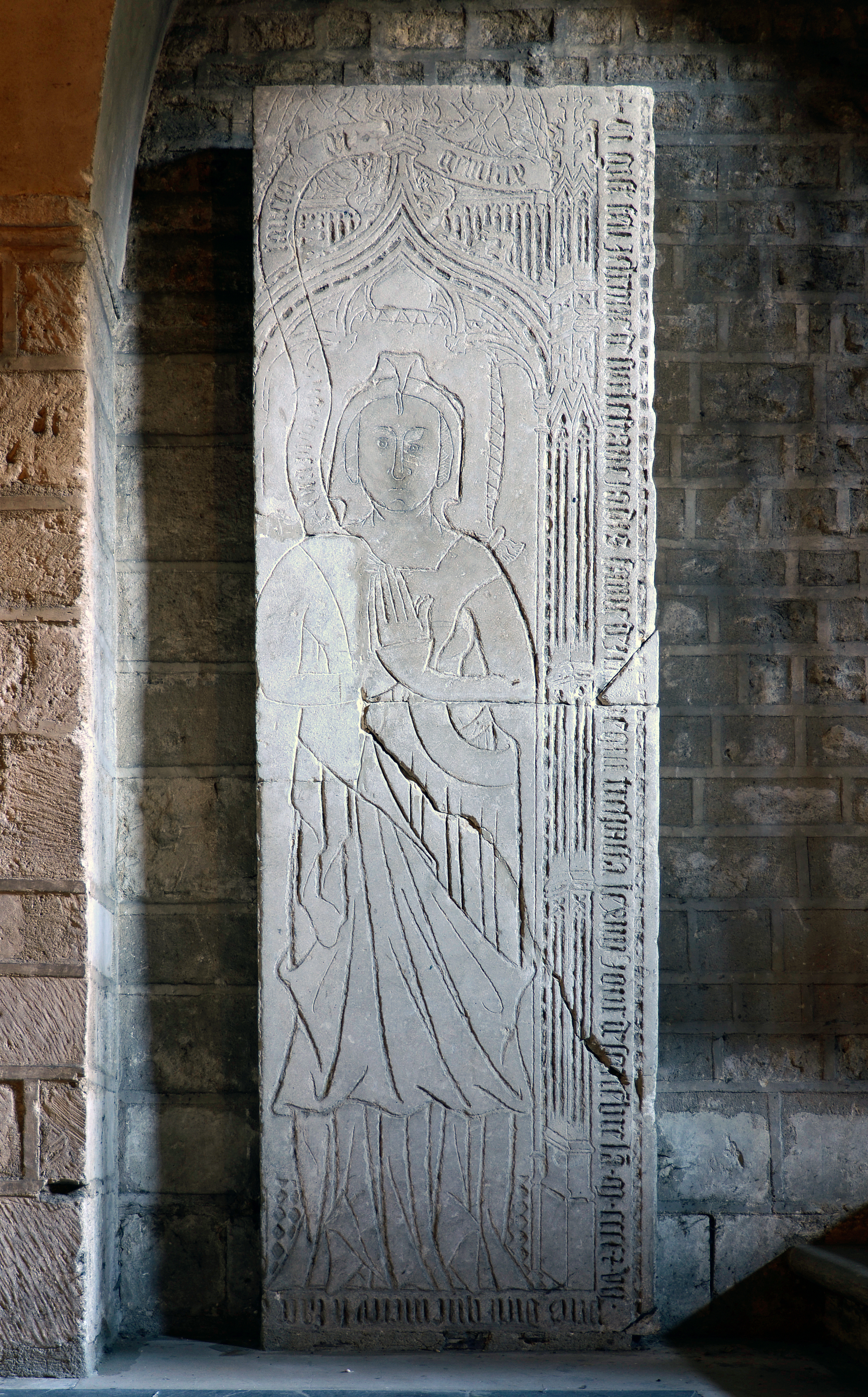
Tombstone of Jeanne Surlestanc (died 1407) in the crypt
