= Alois and Anna Bommer =

German couple

Alois and Anna Bommer were a German couple who faced a military tribunal at Metz along with their three daughters after World War II. The family was accused of pillage, having taken French property into Germany.

Their daughter Elfriede was under 16 at the time of the offences, and thus the tribunals had only the choices of a "reprimand" or "committal of the accused...to his parent's care" with a notice of conviction, and chose the former.

The other two daughters, between the ages of 16 and 18 at the time of the offence, were imprisoned for four months apiece.

Judgment was delivered on February 19, 1947. Both Alois and Anna were convicted of both the theft of horses, furniture and linen, and the receiving of the same stolen property, an oddity since the crimes are exclusive; one cannot both have stolen goods, and then have received the same stolen goods. They were also charged with the theft of silverware, jewellery and money.

Their trial confirmed the principle that the laws of war apply equally to civilians and military personnel.
