= Julian of Le Mans =

Saint Julian of Le Mans
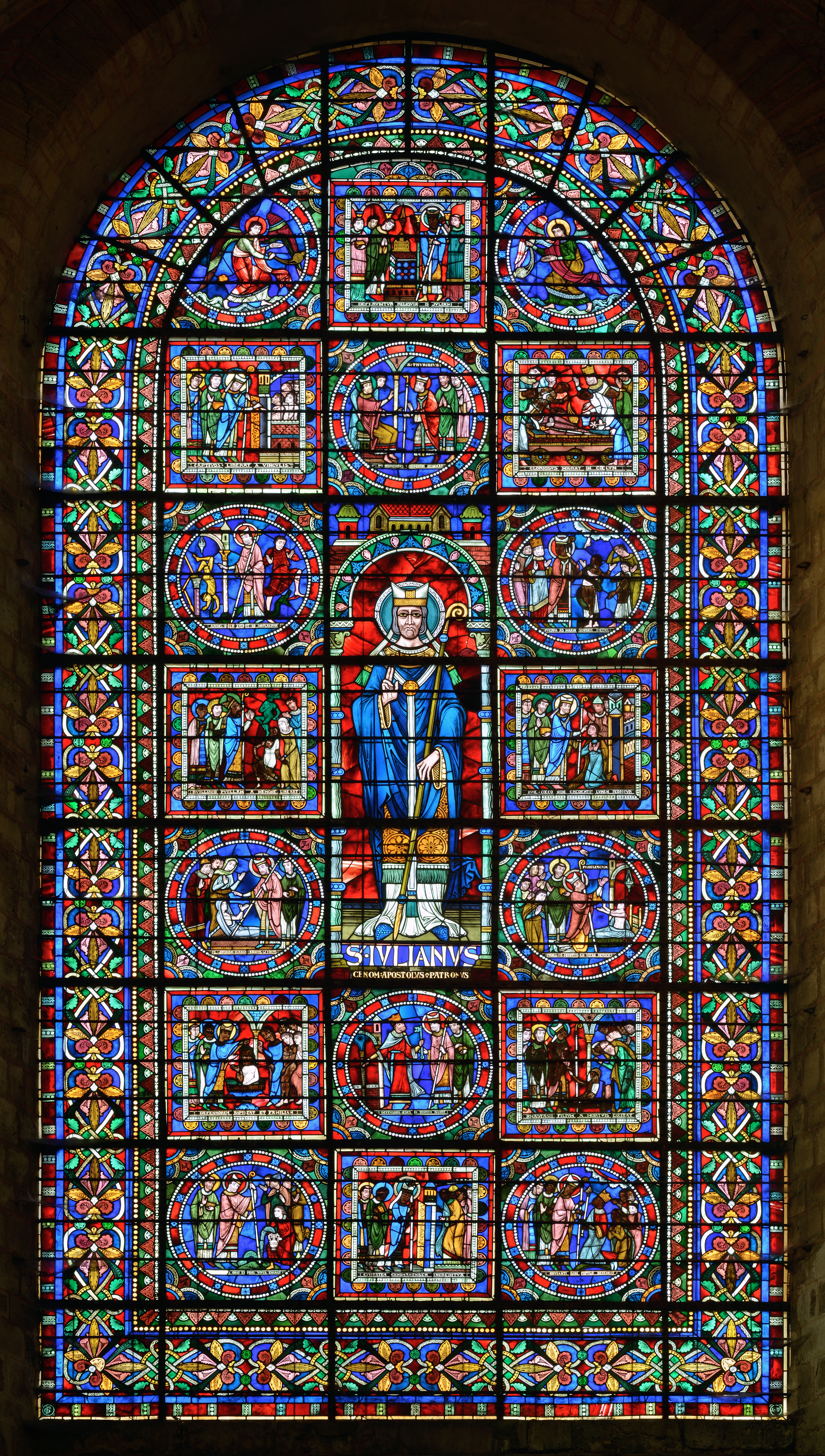
- Stained glass depicting Julian of Le Mans and 16 episodes of his life (12th century, restored in 1897) - West facade of Le Mans Cathedral - Le Mans (Sarthe, France)

Bishop
- Died: 3rd or 4th century
- Venerated in: Roman Catholic Church; Orthodox Church
- Canonized: Pre-Congregation
- Major shrine: Le Mans Cathedral
- Feast: 27 January; 25 July (translation of relics)
- Attributes: Sometimes pictured as a bishop raising a dead child to life, Julian is also shown vanquishing a dragon.

Julian of Le Mans (French: Saint Julien du Mans; Latin: Iulianus; 3rd century; perhaps 4th century) is a saint venerated in both the Roman Catholic and Eastern Orthodox Church, honoured as the first bishop of Le Mans. His feast day is 27 January. The translation of his relics is celebrated on 25 July.

== Life ==
It is reported that he may have been a Roman nobleman, but he was also identified with Simon the Leper or as one of the seventy-two disciples of Christ, in keeping with attempts to claim an apostolic origin for the see.

He was consecrated a bishop at Rome and around the middle of the 3rd century, Julian was sent to Gaul, along with the priest Thuribe and the deacon Pavace, to preach the Gospel to the tribe of the Cenomani. Their capital city was Civitas Cenomanorum (Le Mans), which was suffering from a shortage of drinking water. According to the legends surrounding his life, Julian thrust his staff into the ground and prayed. Water began to gush out of the ground. This miracle allowed him to preach freely within Le Mans. The city's principal citizen was converted to Christianity along with his family, donating to the Church part of his palace to serve as Le Mans' first cathedral church.

Julian converted many other citizens and Le Mans' new bishop cared for the poor, the infirm, and the orphans. His miracles included the resurrection of a dead man.

Upon reaching old age, he retired to live as a hermit at Sarthe.

== Veneration ==
The Cathédrale St-Julien, in Le Mans, is dedicated to him.

The feast of St. Julian of Le Mans was celebrated in England because Henry II of England had been born in Le Mans. His feast was kept throughout the south of England in at least nine Benedictine English monasteries. The Church of St. Julian in Norwich is likely dedicated to him. Having rested in a shrine at the Benedictine convent of Notre-Dame-du-Pre since the Middle Ages, most of his relics were burnt or scattered by the Huguenots in 1562. Julian's head is still shown at the cathedral of Le Mans, where it has been since 1254.
