= Robert (bishop of Le Mans) =

Robert (died 883/85) was the bishop of Le Mans from 857.

Robert had a long-running dispute with the monastery of Saint-Calais. He even produced several forged documents—the famous "Le Mans forgeries"—to support his claim to oversight of the abbey. The monks had had their privilege of episcopal immunity and right of free election of their abbot confirmed at the council of Bonneuil in 855 and again in 862 at Pîtres. Robert succeeded in having Pope Nicholas I order the case re-opened. King Charles the Bald ruled in the Saint-Calais's favour at a synod in the palace of Verberie on 25 October 863. Charles had granted the abbey to Robert in 862, but he was able to claim that it was only a benefice and thus revocable, and that the bishop did not possess it by right, as he claimed. At Verberie, Charles placed the abbey under royal control and denied its claimed immunity.

In 864 Charles sent Robert to Rome with Rothad, the deposed bishop of Soissons, to argue his case before Pope Nicholas. In 873 Robert requested Charles to approve the surrender of some precaria to the monastery of Saint-Vincent du Mans, which was under episcopal control at the time.

== Sources ==
- Barton, Richard Ewing (2004). Lordship in the County of Maine, c. 890–1160. Woodbridge: Boydell Press.
- Goffart, Walter (1966). The Le Mans Forgeries: A Chapter from the History of Church Property in the Ninth Century. Cambridge: Cambridge University Press.
- Nelson, J. L., ed. (1991). The Annals of St-Bertin. Manchester: Manchester University Press.
- Nelson, J. L. (1992). Charles the Bald. London: Longman.
- Piolin, Paul [in French] (1854). Histoire de l'église du Mans. Paris: Julien, Lanier et c.
- Wood, Susan (2006). The Proprietary Church in the Medieval West. Oxford: Oxford University Press.
