= Larmer Bay ruin =

Ruin in the British Virgin Islands

Coordinates: 18°26′59″N 64°37′26″W

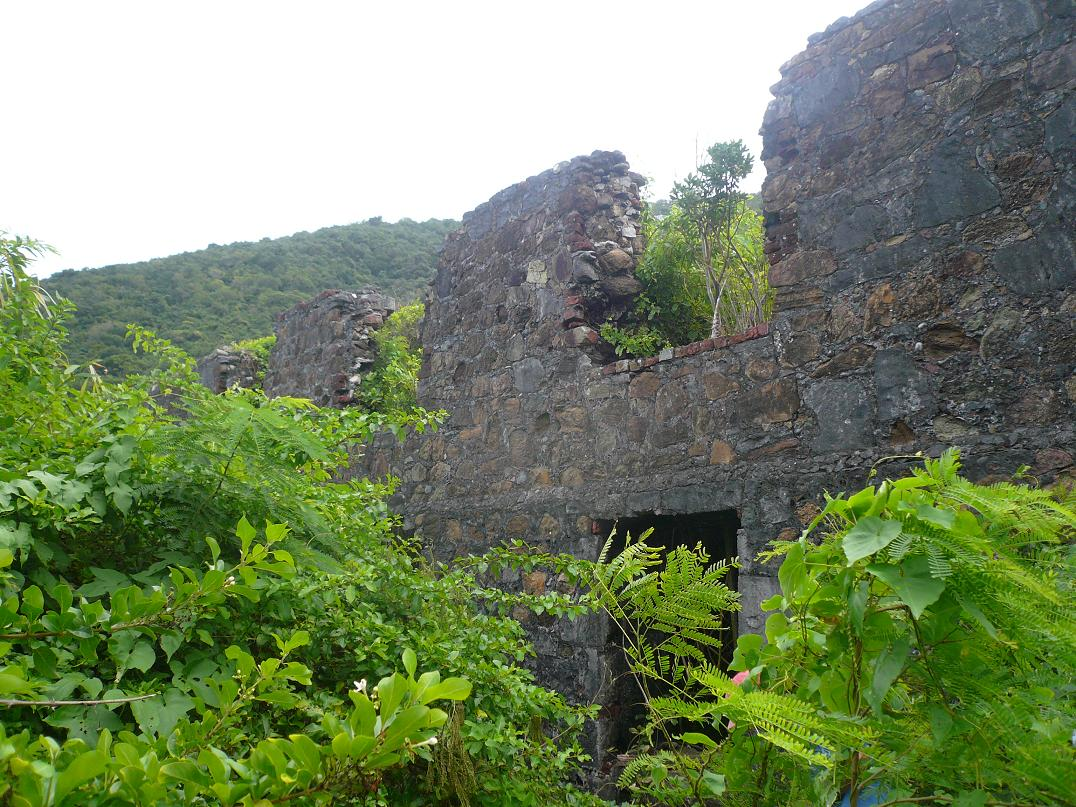
The ruin at Larmer Bay, Tortola

Larmer Bay ruin is a ruin in Larmer Bay, on the north side of Tortola in the British Virgin Islands. The ruin dates from the sugar plantation era, and was presumed abandoned during the economic collapse of the British Virgin Islands during the mid-19th century.

The ruins are difficult to access, as no roads lead down to the bay, and the ghuts leading down the mountain side are relatively steep. The bay is not accessible by sea due to the coral reefs lying close to the shore, and the strong north side swells. However, a road from the nearby housing development descends to within a couple of hundred feet of the bay, and a dirt track leads down to the beach, making it possible to see the ruins without cutting a path.

== Images ==
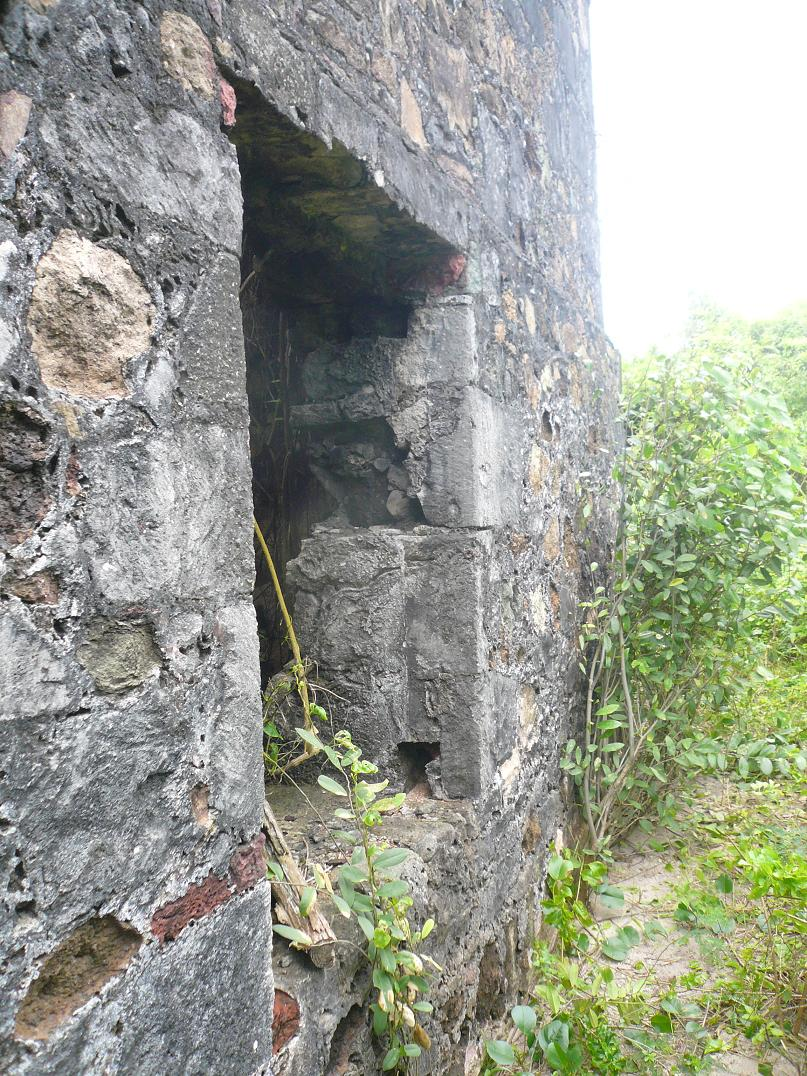
The sea-facing walls

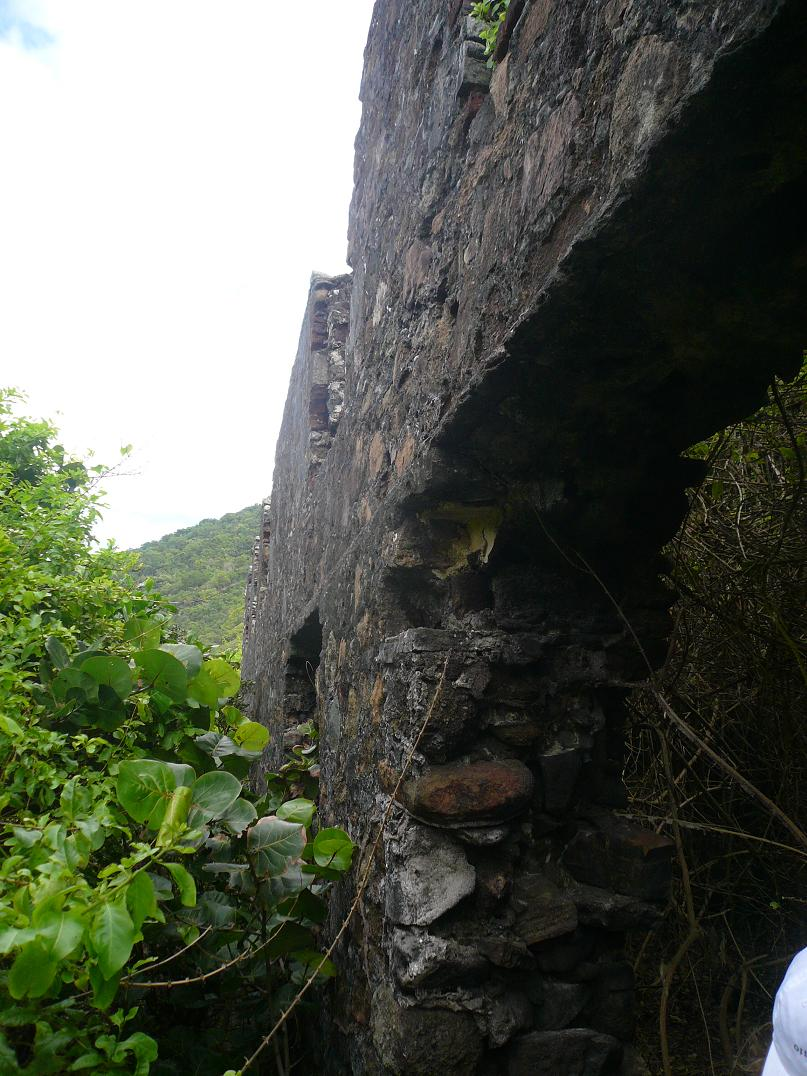
Sea-facing entrance

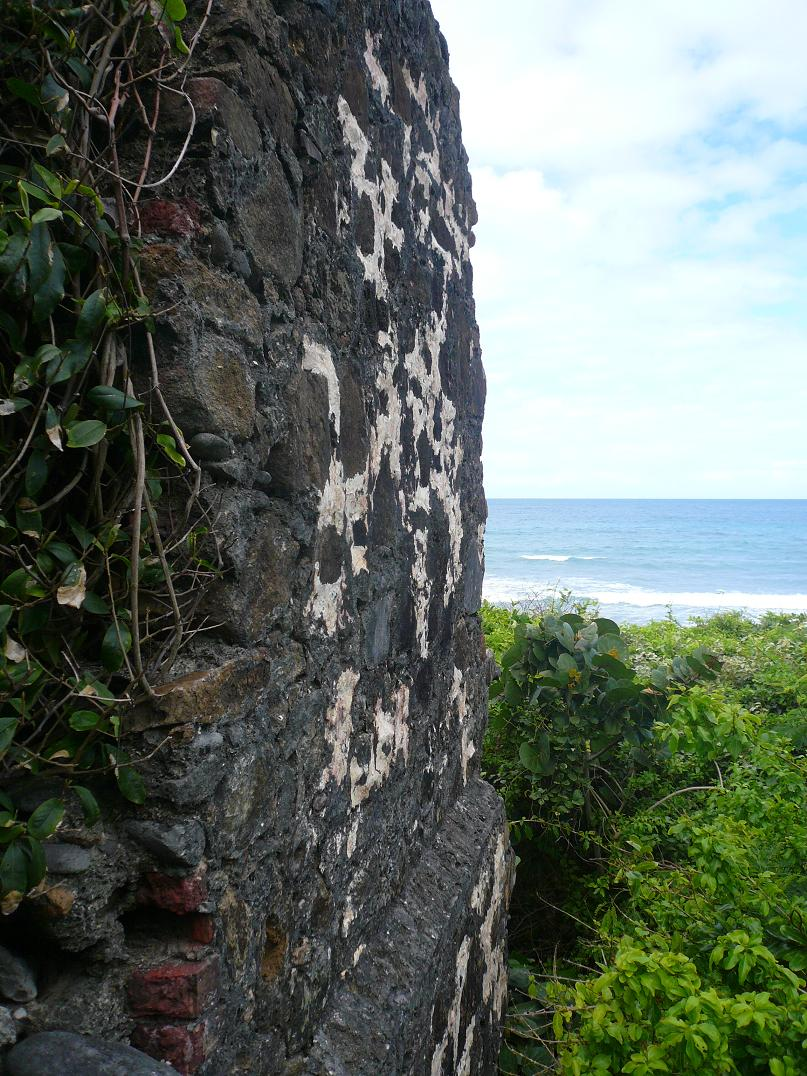
East side of the ruin, looking out to sea

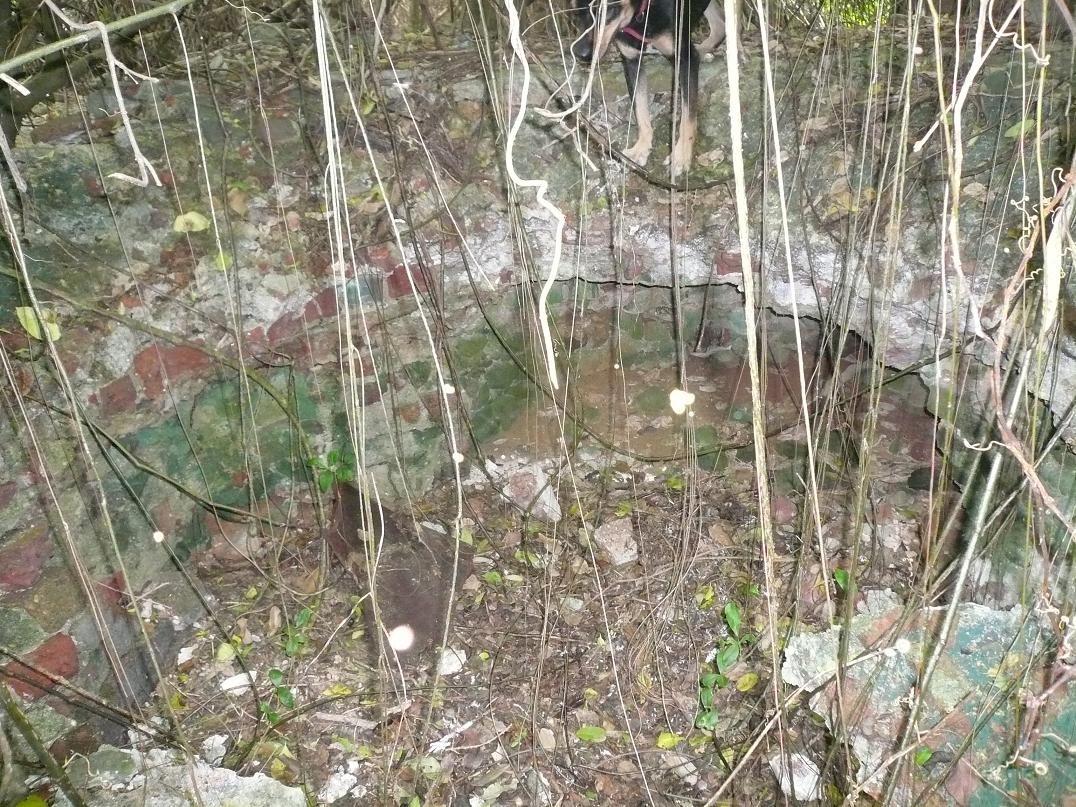
Location of the copper vat

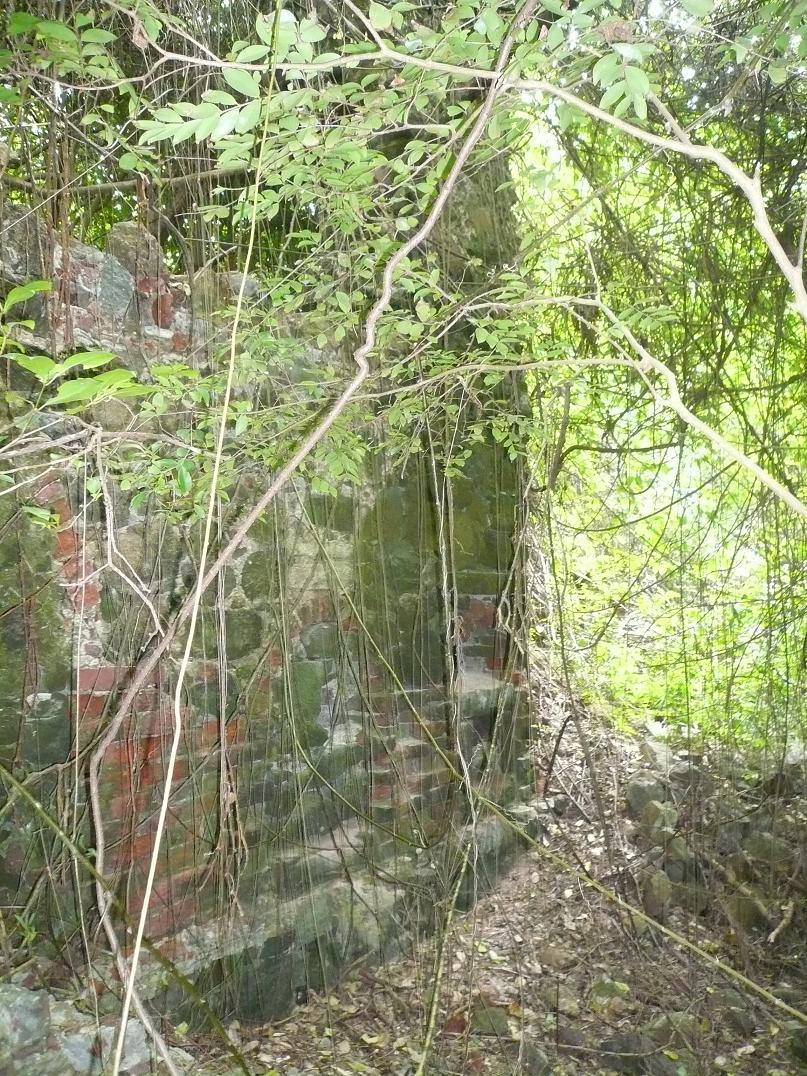
Examples of imported brick, indicating wealth

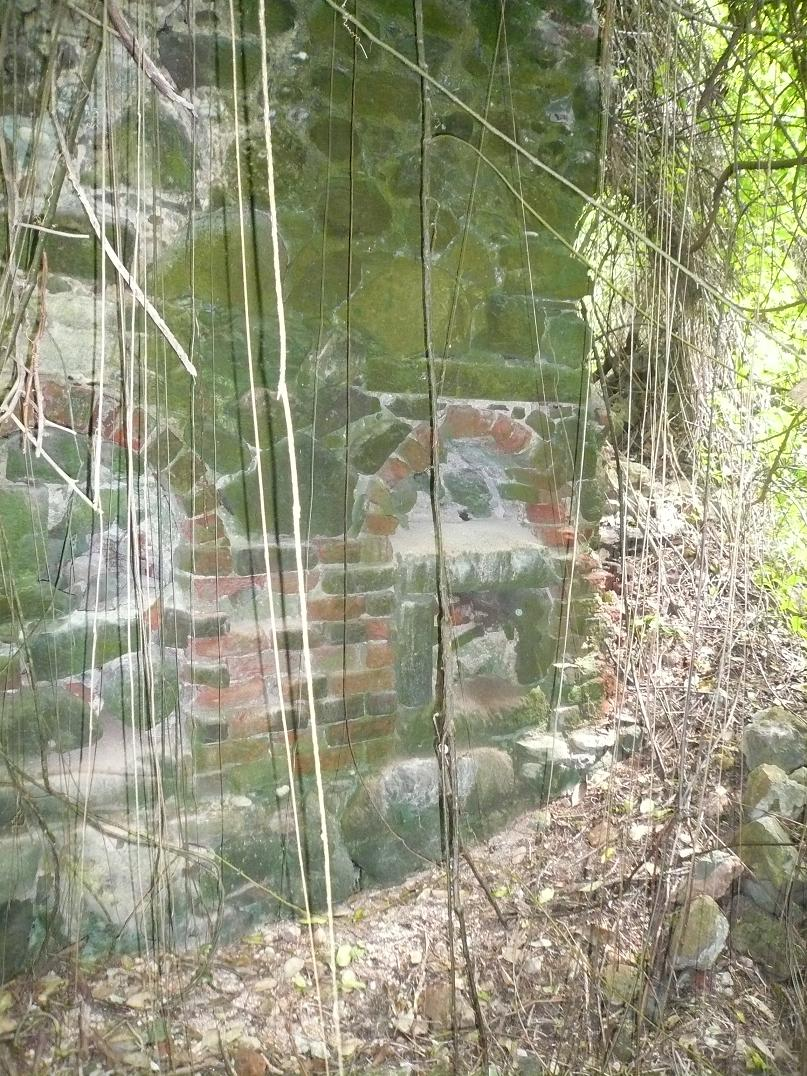
More fine brickwork

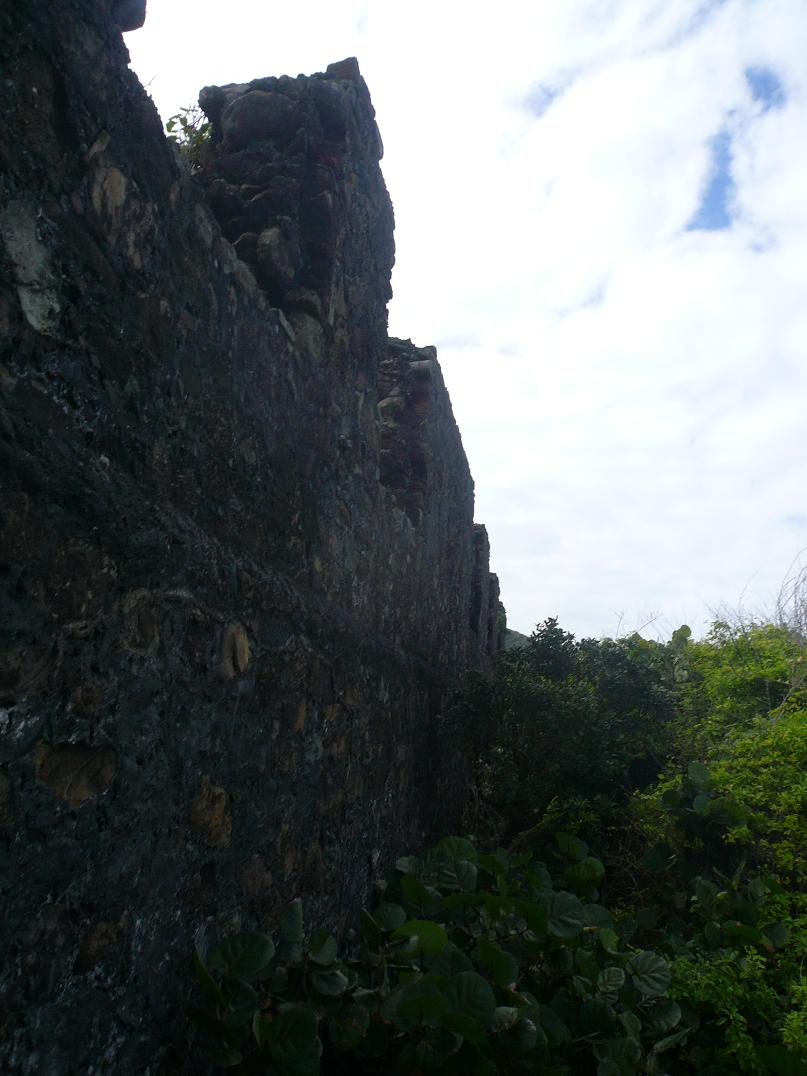
Much of the upper story structure remains intact
