= Bertechramnus =

Bishop of Le Mans from 587 to 623

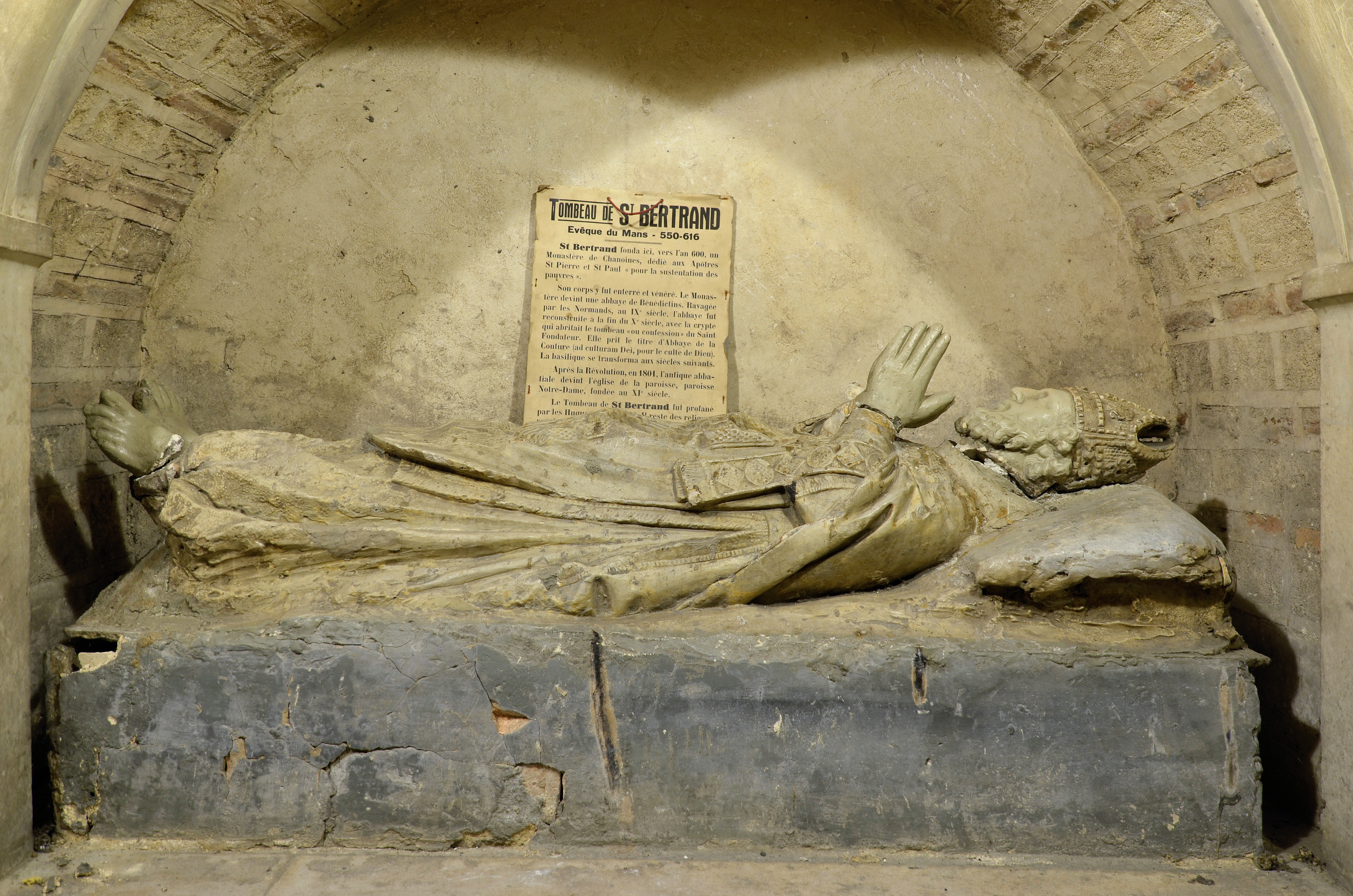
Tomb of Bertram of Le Mans in the crypt of Notre-Dame de la Couture church in Le Mans.

Bertechramnus or Bertram of Le Mans was one of the wealthiest bishops of 6th-century Gaul. He was bishop of Le Mans from 587 until 623.

At the time of his death his will listed a private holding of over 3,000 square kilometres of land. By the end of his time as bishop there were 18 churches in Le Mans.
