= Actus pontificum Cenomannis =

The Actus pontificum Cenomannis in urbe degentium ("Acts of the bishops dwelling in the city of Le Mans") is a series of short biographies of the Bishops of Le Mans, starting with the first legendary bishop Julian, one of the Seventy Disciples. The core text was written in the middle ninth century, probably by a cleric or clerics of the cathedral of Le Mans, though it had several subsequent continuations into the High Middle Ages. Much of the information this core contains, including several charters and diplomas, is partly or wholly fictitious.

The Actus were probably part of an ambitious campaign to extend the bishop's rights over neighbouring monasteries, particularly the Benedictine abbey of Saint-Calais, though the attempt collapsed at the royal council of Verberie in 863. The text is important as evidence for late Carolingian episcopal ideology.

== See also ==
- Catholic Church in France
