= Lomer (saint) =

French saint (died January 19, 593)

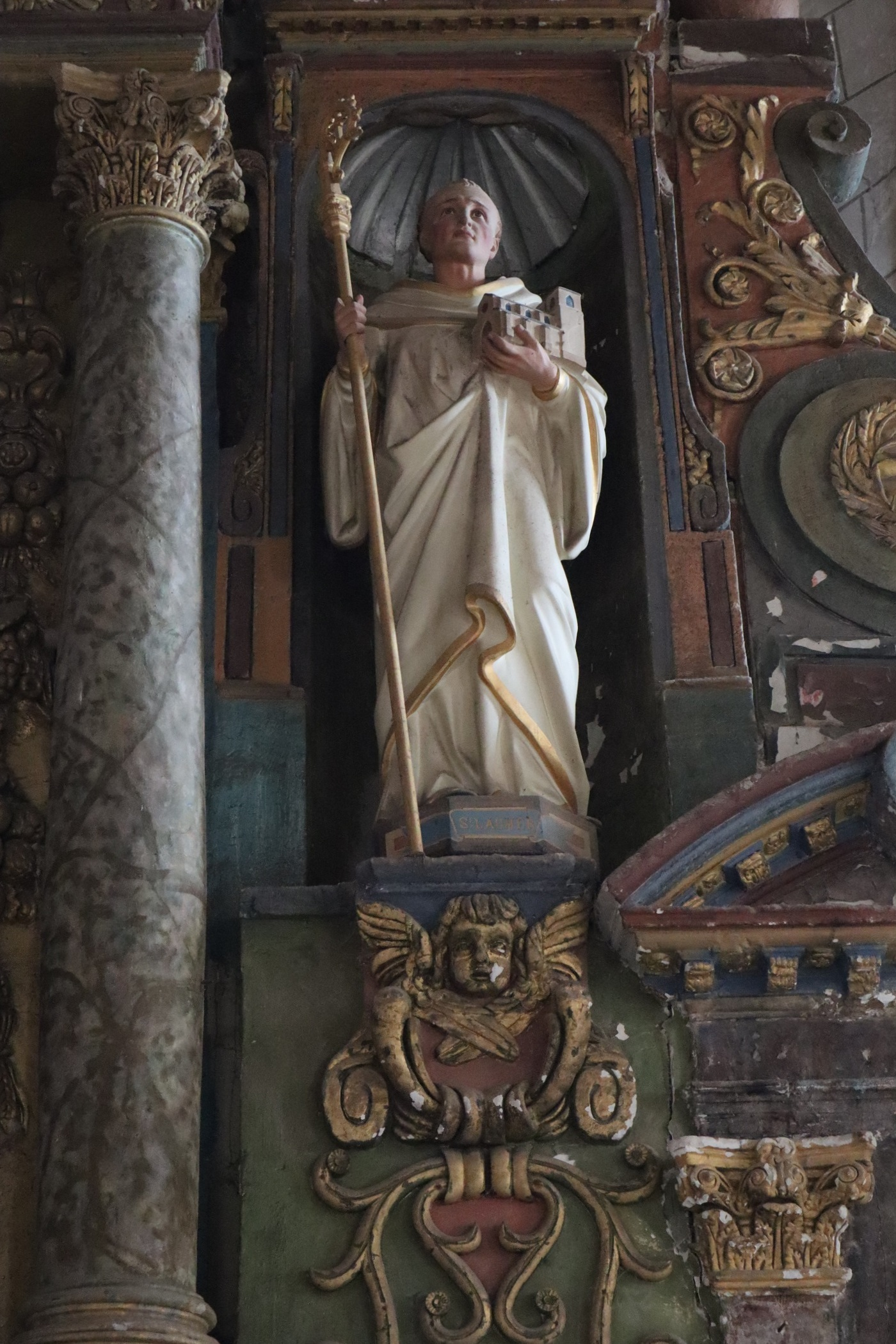
Saint Lomer.

Lomer (died January 19, 593), also known as Laumer, Laudomarus, Launomar, or Launomaro, is a Christian saint whose feast day is January 19. He founded an abbey at Corbion near Chartres in present-day France. The vita of Saint Lomer reveals that, as a youth, Lomer was a shepard, before being accepted into the monastery of St. Mesmin, near Orleans, and would eventually become a priest in Chartres. The vita also states that Lomer lived to be more than one hundred years old. One known copy of this vita was begun by Orderic Vitalis while he was copyist at the library of Saint-Évroul.

Lomer was initially trained for the priesthood by a priest by the name of Chirmirius, was ordained, and then served as priest in Chartres and the surrounds, where he was made both canon and cellarer. Later in life, Lomer withdrew to live a eremitic lifestyle in the forests of La Perche. Due to his reputation for performing miracles, including the gift of prophecy, a number of disciples came to his hermitage in the forest. According to Rev. Alban Butler, the location of this hermitage was later the site of Fontevraud Abbey. The presence of these disciples led Lomer to eventually found a cenobitic community, the monastery of Curbio, in c. 570.

Following his death in 593, his relics were translated to Blois in c. 920, where a monastery had been constructed and dedicated to him, the monastery of Saint-Lomer. These Benedictine monks were fleeing from the Scandanvian invasion of Neustria, which would come to be known as Normandy. While most of his body is said to have been translated to the monastery at Blois, his head was allegedly interred at a priory in Auvergne. The monastery outside of Blois would eventually be destroyed during the French Wars of Religion, although the church itself still stands, known as the Church of Saint Nicholas.

In the early twentieth century, an event in the life of St. Lomer - an incident involving the theft of the saint's favourite cow - was published in The Book of Saints andFriendly Beasts, a collection of brief hagiographical tales for children, compiled by Abbie Farwell Brown. Lomer's vita states that the abbot was so holy that 'savage wild beasts obeyed when he commanded'; according to Robert Bartlett, this obedience was intended to remind readers of the idyllic lives of Adam and Eve in the Garden of Eden.
