= Carilef =

Carilef (French Calais, Latin Calevisus; died 541) was a hermit who founded the monastery of Aniole. The town of Saint-Calais takes its name from him. According to his ancient biography, the Vita Carileffi, King Childebert I granted him lands after encountering the hermit in a forest where the king was hunting. Laumer was his successor and Siviard, another successor, wrote the Vita.

In the Roman Catholic Church, his feast is celebrated on 1 July.
