= Vasilisa =

Vasilisa may refer to:

== Name ==
- Vasilisa (name), a given name (and a list of people and characters with the name)
- Vasilisa (2014 film), a Russian historical film with Svetlana Khodchenkova
- Vasilisa (2000 film), a German-Russian film featuring Simon Verhoeven and Nina Hagen

== See also ==
- Vasilisa the Beautiful, Russian fairy tale
- Vasilisa the Beautiful (1939 film), Russian film
- Vasilisa the Beautiful (1977 film), Russian animation film
- Vasilisa the Wise, Eastern European variant of the fairy tale The Frog Princess
- Basilissa (disambiguation)
- Vasilissa (disambiguation)

== Other languages ==
- Regina Ιταλία
- Reina Ισπανία
