= December 28 (Eastern Orthodox liturgics) =

Day in the Eastern Orthodox liturgical calendar

Eastern Orthodox liturgical calendar
December 27	December 28	December 29
December 28 O.S. ≍ January 10 N.S. December 28 N.S ≍ December 15 O.S.

An Eastern Orthodox cross

December 28 in Eastern Orthodox liturgical calendars is a feast day and a day of commemoration of saints and martyrs. Although some Orthodox churches use the Revised Julian Calendar and others use the traditional Julian calendar, the fixed commemorations for their respective December 28 are broadly the same, no matter which calendar is used. (Note: Despite the dates being the same, the days to which they refer typically differ by 13 days. The notation Old Style or O.S. is sometimes used to indicate a date in the traditional Julian Calendar (the "Old Calendar"). The notation New Style or N.S. indicates a date in the Revised Julian calendar (the "New Calendar").)

== Feasts ==
- Afterfeast of the Nativity of Christ

== Saints ==
- Apostle Nicanor the Deacon, one of the Seven Deacons, and one of the Seventy (34)
- Martyr Secundus, an Enlightener of Spain, sent by the Apostles to Spain to preach the Gospel of Jesus Christ (1st century) (Note: This Secundus is likely the same individual as the Secundus mentioned in the Seven Apostolic Men; see also May 15.)
- The 20,000 Martyrs of Nicomedia (302), including:
  - Hieromartyr Glycerius, priest
  - Deacons Theophilus and Migdonius
  - Martyrs Zeno, Dorotheus, Mardonius, Indes, Gorgonius, Peter, and Euthymius
  - Virgin Martyrs Agape, Domna (the former pagan priestess), Theophila, and others (Note: further: St. Anthimus of Nicomedia (September 3 (Eastern Orthodox liturgics)))
- Martyr Ploutodoros. (Note: He is unknown in the Synaxaria. However his memory is recorded in Patmos Codex 256 as follows: "On this day, the contest of the Holy Martyr Ploutodoros"; ((in Greek): «τῇ αὕτῃ ἡμέρᾳ, ἄθλησις τοῦ Ἁγίου μάρτυρος Πλουτοδώρου»).)
- Venerable Babylas of Tarsus in Cilicia.
- Venerable Stephen the Wonderworker. (Note: This is likely the same saint as the one commemorated on March 31; however a minority of Menologia place his memory here on December 28. In Parisian Codex 1623 f.1436 are found remnants of his Akolouthia. From this evidence it becomes clear that he was ascetic, although it is unknown when and where. S. Efstratiadis speculates that it is not at all unlikely, that this St. Stephen is one and the same person as the Venerable Stephen of Mar Sabbas monastery, the Wonderworker, whose memory is celebrated on October 28 (Eastern Orthodox liturgics).)

== Pre-Schism Western saints ==
- Martyrs Castor, Victor and Rogatian, in North Africa.
- Saint Domnio (Domnion), a righteous priest in Rome. (Note: "At Rome, St. Domnion, priest.")
- Saints Romulus and Conindrus, two of the first people to preach Orthodoxy on the Isle of Man, they were contemporaries of Saint Patrick (c. 450) (Note: "ST. ROMULUS and ST. CONINDRUS were probably the first preachers of the Gospel in the island, and flourished while St. Patrick was exercising his apostolate in Ireland. St. Patrick himself is venerated as one of the chief Patrons of Man, and may have visited it some time during his life; but it does not seem reconcilable with his Acts to say, as some have done, that he was its first evangelist.")
- Saint Maughold (Maccaldus), a former brigand in Ireland, was converted by Saint Patrick and sent to the Isle of Man, where his episcopate was very fruitful (c. 488)
- Saint Antony of Lérins (Anthony the Hermit), renowned for miracles (c. 520) (Note: Born in Lower Pannonia, he served God as a hermit in several places north of the Alps until he found rest for the last two years of his life as a monk at Lérins in France.)

== Post-Schism Orthodox saints ==
- Saint Simon the Myrrhgusher, founder of Simonopetra, Mount Athos (1287)
- Saint Ignatius, Monk, of Loma (Vologda) (Ignatii of Lomsk and Yaroslavsk) (1591)
- Saint Nephon the New Cenobiarch (1809)
- Saint Cornelius, monk of Krypetsk Monastery, Pskov (1903) (Note: See: (in Russian) Корнилий Крыпецкий. Википедии. (Russian Wikipedia).)

=== New martyrs and confessors ===
- New Hieromartyr Nikodim (Νikodemos) Kononov, Bishop of Belgorod, at Solovki (1918)
- New Hieromartyr Arcadius Reshetnikov, Deacon (1918)
- New Hieromartyr Alexander Dagaev, Priest (1920)
- New Hieromartyrs Theoctistus Khoperskov, Leonid Viktorov, and Nicholas Rodimov, Priests (1937)
- New Hieromartyr Alexander Tsitseronov, known as Cicero, Priest (1938)
- New Hieromartyr Arethus Nasonov, Priest (1938) (Note: See: (in Russian) Насонов, Арефа Акимович. Википедии. (Russian Wikipedia).)
- New Confessor Smaragda (Onishchenko), Abbess of Nezhinsk (uk), Ukraine (1945) (Note: See: (in Ukrainian) Введенський жіночий монастир (Ніжин). (Ukrainian Wikipedia).) (Note: See: (in Ukrainian) Смарагда (Онищенко) Ніжинська. Вікіпедія. (Ukrainian Wikipedia).) (Note: further: January 2 (Eastern Orthodox liturgics) - Abbess of Nezhinsk birth; and April 20 (Eastern Orthodox liturgics) - glorification)

== Other commemorations ==
- Repose of Joseph the Hesychast, Romania (1828)

== Icon gallery ==
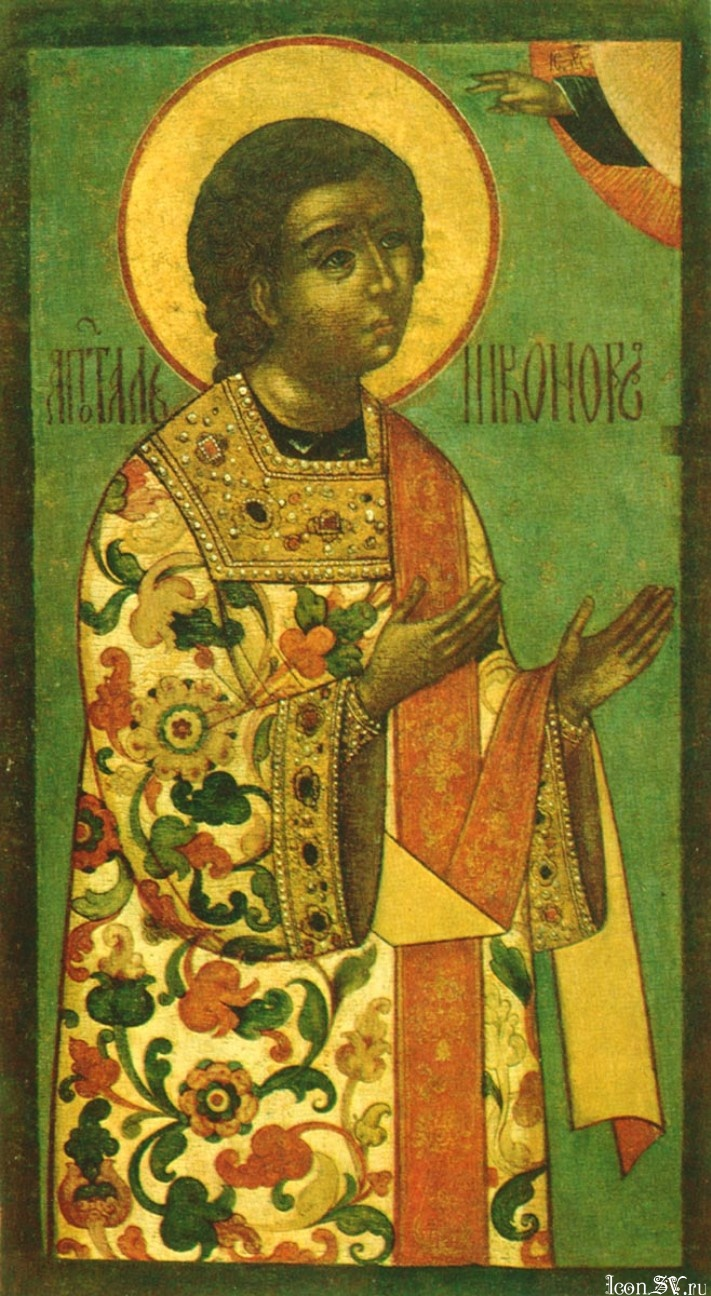
Apostle Nicanor the Deacon.

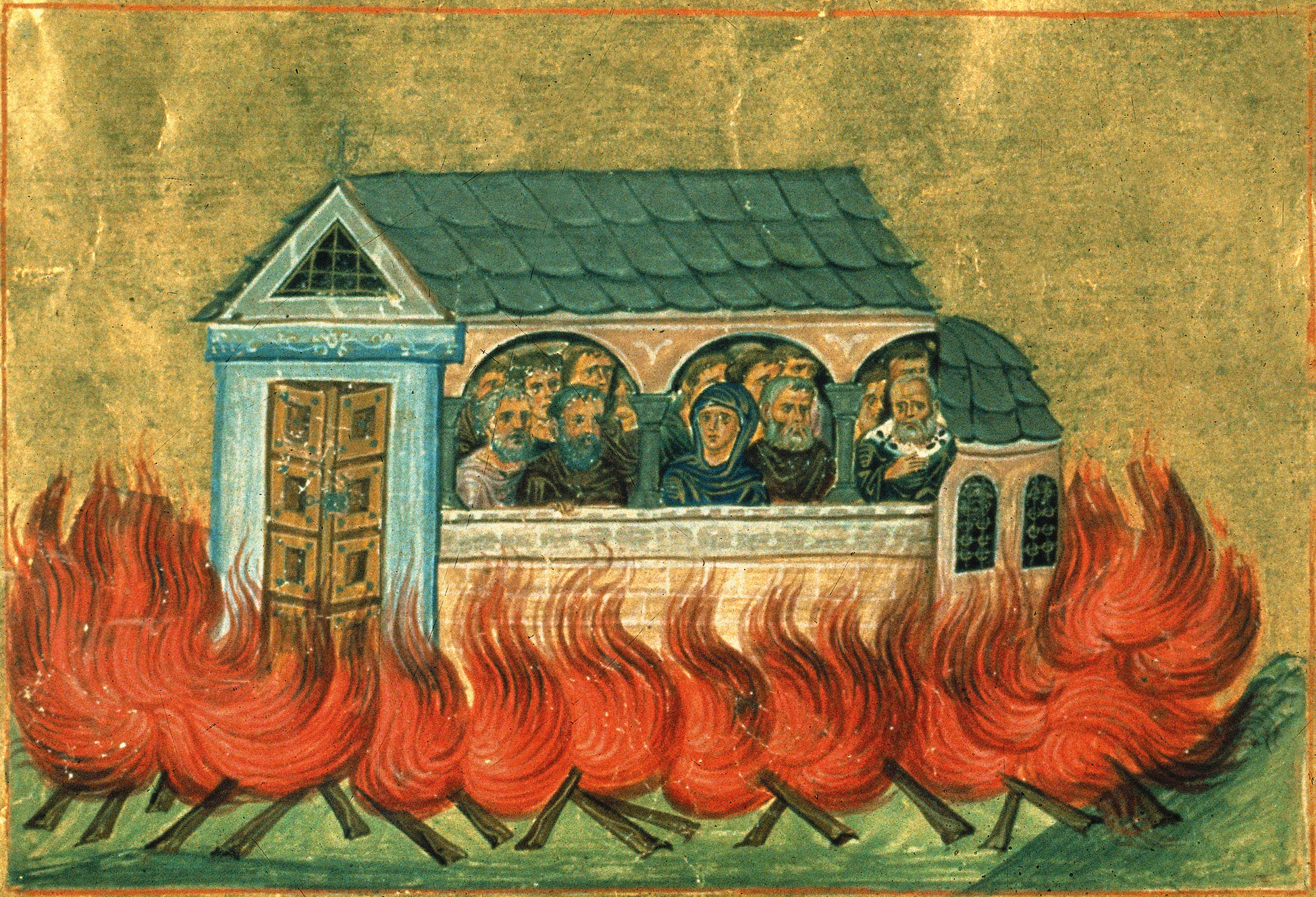
The 20,000 Martyrs of Nicomedia.
(Menologion of Basil II, 10th century).

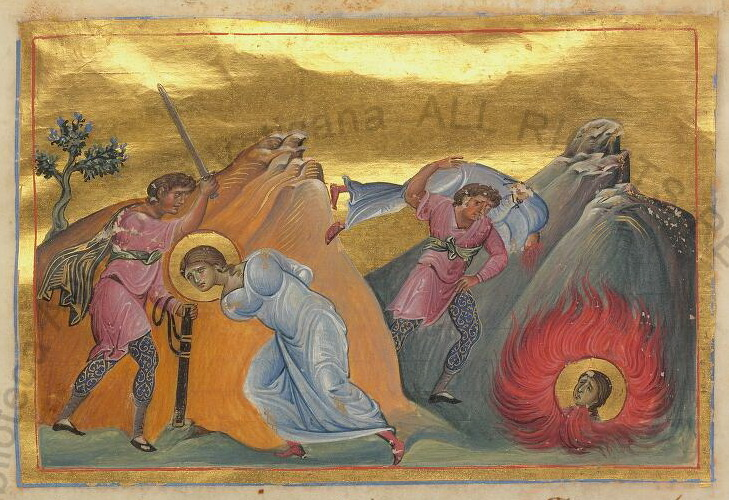
Martyrs Indris and Domna.
(Menologion of Basil II, 10th century).

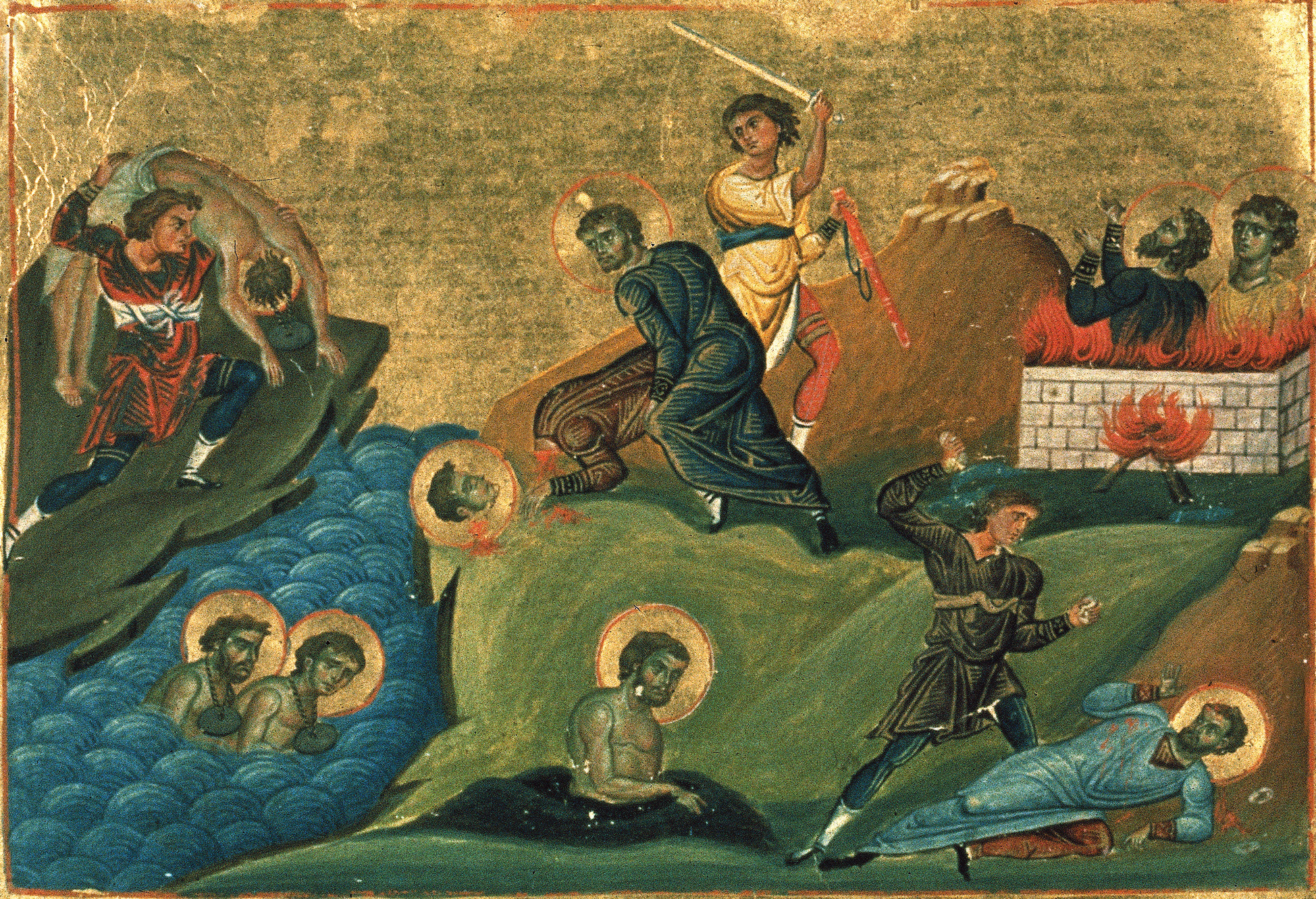
Martyrs: Peter, Indes, Gorgonius by drowning;
Zeno and Dorotheus by beheading;
Mardonius and Hieromartyr Glycerius, by fire;
Theophilus the Deacon by stoning;
and Migdonius in a cesspool.

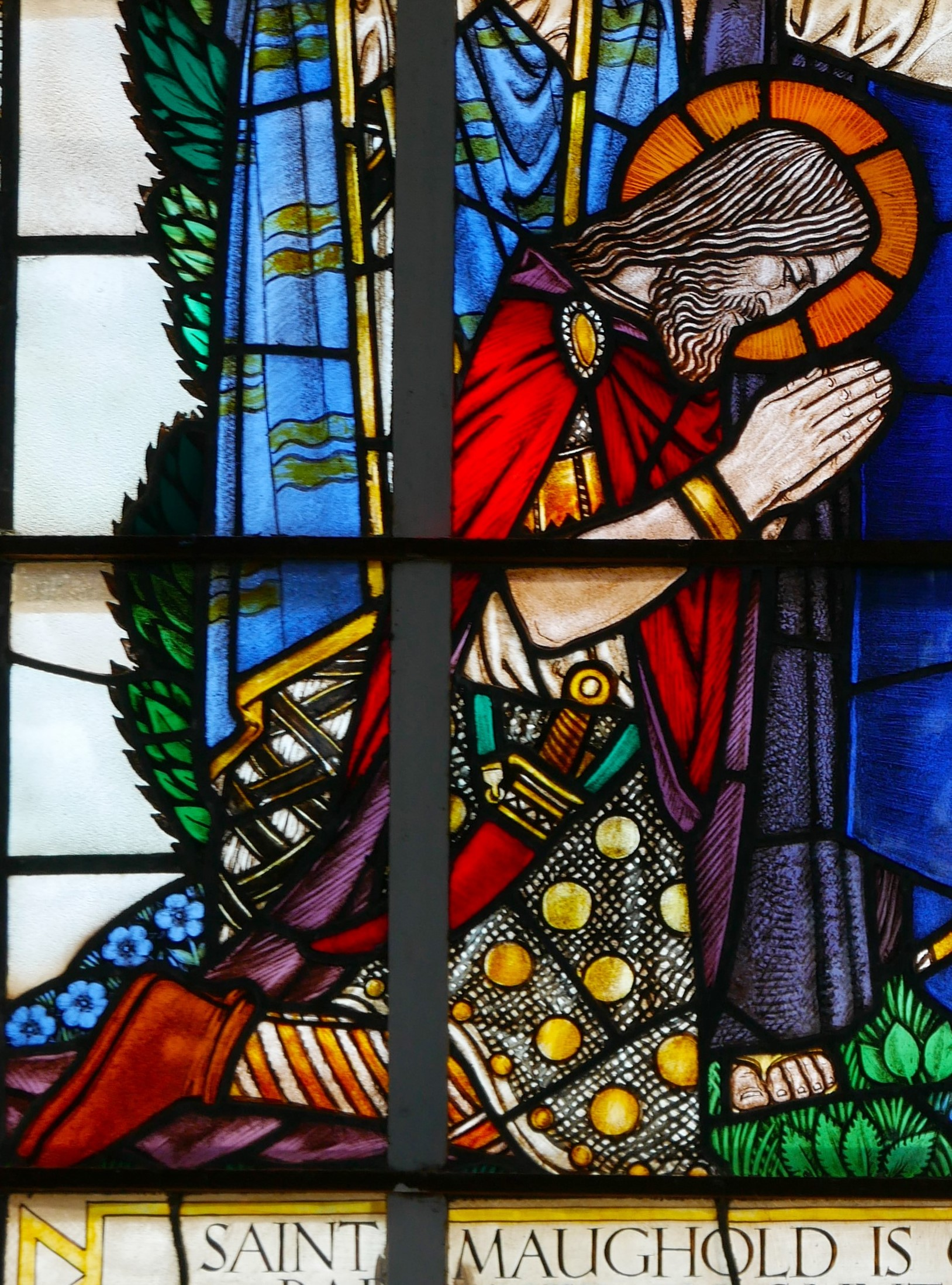
St. Maughold.

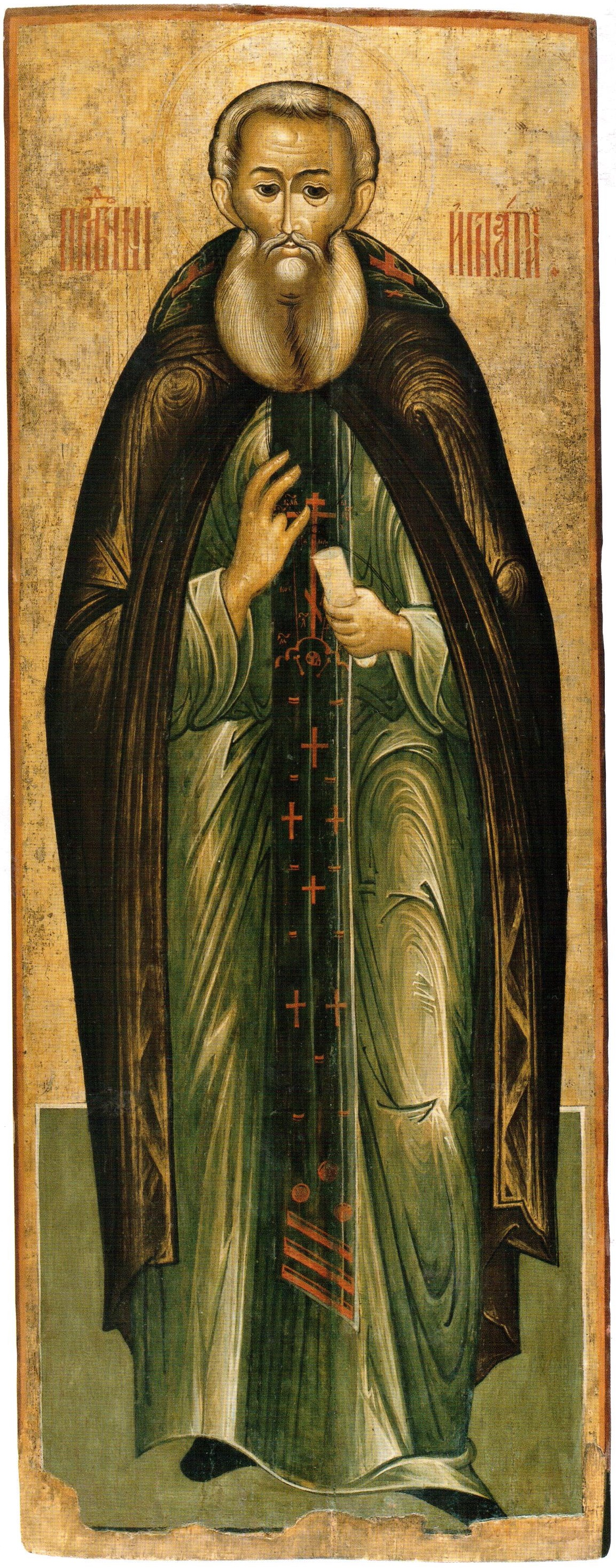
Ignatius of Lomsk and Yaroslavsk.

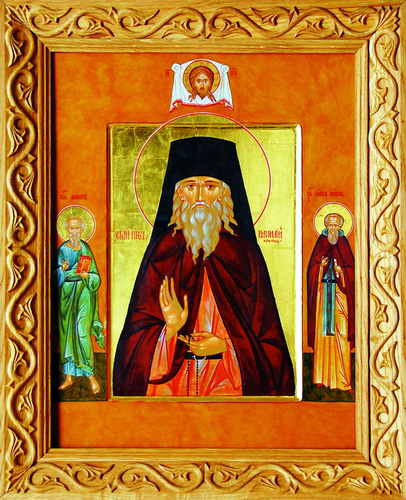
St. Cornelius, monk of Krypetsk Monastery, Pskov.

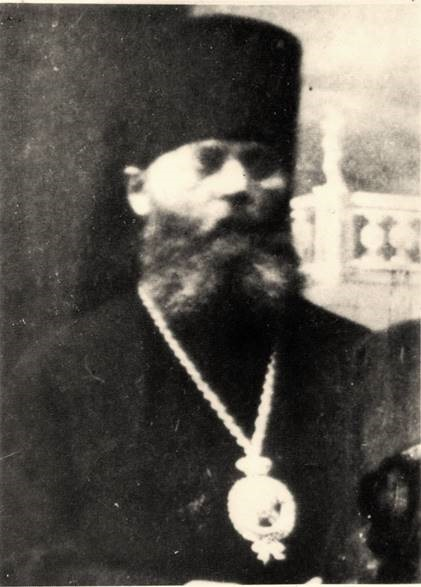
New Hieromartyr Nikodim (Kononov), Bishop of Belgorod.

New Hieromartyr Arethus Nasonov, Priest.

== Sources ==
- December 28/January 10. Orthodox Calendar (PRAVOSLAVIE.RU).
- January 10 / December 28. HOLY TRINITY RUSSIAN ORTHODOX CHURCH (A parish of the Patriarchate of Moscow).
- December 28. OCA - The Lives of the Saints.
- The Autonomous Orthodox Metropolia of Western Europe and the Americas (ROCOR). St. Hilarion Calendar of Saints for the year of our Lord 2004. St. Hilarion Press (Austin, TX). p. 3.
- December 28. Latin Saints of the Orthodox Patriarchate of Rome.
- The Roman Martyrology. Transl. by the Archbishop of Baltimore. Last Edition, According to the Copy Printed at Rome in 1914. Revised Edition, with the Imprimatur of His Eminence Cardinal Gibbons. Baltimore: John Murphy Company, 1916. pp. 399–400.

Greek Sources

- Great Synaxaristes: (in Greek) 28 ΔΕΚΕΜΒΡΙΟΥ. ΜΕΓΑΣ ΣΥΝΑΞΑΡΙΣΤΗΣ.
- (in Greek) Συναξαριστής. 28 Δεκεμβρίου. ECCLESIA.GR. (H ΕΚΚΛΗΣΙΑ ΤΗΣ ΕΛΛΑΔΟΣ).

Russian Sources

- (in Russian) 10 января (28 декабря). Православная Энциклопедия под редакцией Патриарха Московского и всея Руси Кирилла (электронная версия). (Orthodox Encyclopedia - Pravenc.ru).
- (in Russian) 28 декабря (ст.ст.) 10 января 2015 (нов. ст.). Русская Православная Церковь Отдел внешних церковных связей. (DECR).
