= Basilissa (disambiguation) =

Basilissa (Ancient Greek: Βασίλισσα) is a feminine form of the Greek title basileus ("king" or "emperor").

Basilissa may also refer to:

- Basilinna or Basilissa, the ritual queen who was wed to Dionysus during the Anthesteria in ancient Athens
- Basilissa (gastropod), a genus in the family Seguenziidae
- Basilissa (name)

== See also ==
- Basilia (disambiguation)
- Basilica (disambiguation)
- Vasilisa (name)
- Vasilissa (disambiguation)
