= Danube Gorge =

Danube Gorge may refer to various gorges along the River Danube in Europe:

- Danube Gorge (Weltenburg), near Weltenburg, Bavaria, Germany
- Danube Gorge (Beuron), near Beuron, Baden-Wurttemberg, Germany
- Danube Gorge (Iron Gates), near Orsova, Romania
- Various other gorges along the Danube, see Danube
