= September 3 (Eastern Orthodox liturgics) =

Day in the Eastern Orthodox liturgical calendar

Eastern Orthodox liturgical calendar
September 2	September 3	September 4
September 3 O.S. ≍ September 16 N.S. September 3 N.S ≍ August 21 O.S.

An Eastern Orthodox cross

September 3 in Eastern Orthodox liturgical calendars is a feast day and a day of commemoration of saints and martyrs. Although some Orthodox churches use the Revised Julian Calendar and others use the traditional Julian calendar, the fixed commemorations for their respective September 3 are broadly the same, no matter which calendar is used. (Note: Despite the dates being the same, the days to which they refer typically differ by 13 days. The notation Old Style or O.S. is sometimes used to indicate a date in the traditional Julian Calendar (the "Old Calendar"). The notation New Style or N.S. indicates a date in the Revised Julian calendar (the "New Calendar").)

== Saints ==
- Saint Phoebe, Deaconess of Cenchreae near Corinth (1st century) (Note: Name days celebrated today include: Phoebe (Φοίβη); Phoebos (Φοῖβος).) (Note: "At Corinth, the birthday of St. Phoebe, mentioned by the blessed apostle Paul in his epistle to the Romans.")
- Hieromartyr Aristion of Alexandria (Kelladion), Bishop of Alexandria Scabiosa (modern Iskenderun) (c. 167) (Note: Name days celebrated today include: Aristion (Ἀριστίων); Aristea (Ἀριστέα).)
- Hieromartyr Anthimus of Nicomedia, Bishop of Nicomedia (302) (Note: Name days celebrated today include: Anthimos (Ἄνθιμος).)
- Hieromartyr Theophilus the Deacon, and martyrs Dorotheus, Mardonius, Migdonius, Peter, Indes, Gorgonius, Zeno, Virgin Domna, and Euthymius (302)
- Martyr Basilissa of Nicomedia (309) (Note: "At Nicomedia, the martyrdom of St. Basillissa, virgin and martyr, in the persecution of Diocletian, under the governor Alexander. At the age of nine years, after having, through the power of God, overcome scourging, fire, and the beasts, she gave up her soul to her Creator in prayer.")
- Martyr Zenon, immersed in a cauldron of boiling lead. (Note: "Also, the holy martyrs Zeno and Chariton. The one was cast into a caldron of melted lead, the other into a burning furnace.")
- Martyr Chariton, thrown into a pit of boiling lime.
- Martyr Archontius.
- Venerable Theoctistus of Palestine, fellow ascetic with Venerable Euthymius the Great (451)
- Saint Constantine the New (Heraclius Constantine), Emperor of Byzantium, in the Church of the Holy Apostles (641)
- Saint Trivelius Theoktist (Khan Tervel of Bulgaria), who played an important role in defeating the Arabs during the Siege of Constantinople in 717–718 (721) (Note: See also: August 15 - Commemoration of the Miracle of the Theotokos at the Siege of Constantinople (717–18).)

== Pre-Schism Western saints ==
- Saints Euphemia, Dorothy, Thecla and Erasma, a group of virgin-martyrs in Aquileia in Italy, venerated in Venice and Ravenna (1st century) (Note: "At Aquileia, the holy virgins and martyrs Euphemia, Dorothea, Thecla, and Erasma. Under Nero, after enduring many torments, they were slain with the sword, and buried by St. Hermagoras.")
- Saint Mansuetus (Mansuy), Bishop of Toul in France, Confessor (c. 350)
- Saint Ambrose, Bishop of Sens in France (c. 455)
- Saint Macanisius (Mac Nisse of Connor), the founder and first bishop-abbot of Connor (514) (Note: By tradition he was baptised as an infant by St Patrick, who later consecrated him bishop. He also founded a monastery, probably in Kells.)
- Saint Auxanus (Sant'Ansano), Bishop of Milan (568)
- Saint Maurilius, Bishop of Cahors in France (580) (Note: It is recorded that he knew the whole Bible by heart.)
- Saint Natalis, a priest in Casale in Piedmont (6th century)
- Saint Gregory the Great (the Dialogist), Pope of Rome (604) (Note: Born in Rome of patrician parents, he became the prefect of the city. He soon resigned the office, turned his home on the Caelian Hill into a monastery and became a monk. Next he was sent to Constantinople as apocrisarius or ambassador. On his return he was chosen Pope (590). First in importance was his mission to England. This was important not only for the conversion of England, but also for the spreading of Orthodoxy among the other Germanic peoples of north-west Europe. He also encouraged the conversion of the Lombards in Italy and the Goths in Spain, embellished the liturgy, defended and befriended monasticism and cared for the poor. He was a prolific writer; his dialogues and his Regula Pastoralis are classics of Orthodox literature.) (Note: "At Rome, the raising to the Sovereign Pontificate of St. Gregory the Great, an incomparable man, who, being forced to take that burden upon himself, sent forth from the more exalted throne brighter rays of sanctity upon the world.") (see also: March 12)
- Saint Remaclus, Bishop of Maastricht (c. 663) (Note: A noble born in Aquitaine in France, he became a monk and the first Abbot of Solignac near Limoges and then of Cougnon in Luxembourg. About the year 648 he founded the monasteries of Stavelot and Malmédy in Belgium and in 652 he became Bishop of Maastricht in the Netherlands.)
- Saint Frugentius, a monk at Fleury Abbey, martyred with St Aigulphus, Abbot of Lérins in France (675)
- Saint Aigulphus of Provence (Ayou, Ayoul), Abbot of Lérins (c. 676) (Note: Born in Blois in France, at the age of twenty he became a monk at Fleury. He was sent to Montecassino to attempt to obtain the relics of St Benedict and later became Abbot of Lérins. With four of his monks he was taken by evildoers to an island near Corsica where they were all martyred.) (Note: "The same day, the birthday of the holy martyrs Aigulphus, abbot of Lerins, and the monks, his companions, who, after their tongues were cut off, and their eyes plucked out, were killed with the sword.") (Note: See: (in French) Aigulphe de Lérins. Wikipédia. (French Wikipedia).)
- Saint Hereswith, a princess from Northumbria in England, and sister of St Hilda, she ended her life as a nun at Chelles Abbey in France (c. 690) (Note: "ST. HERESWITHA was daughter of Ereric, the nephew of St. Edwin, King of Northumbria, and sister of St. Hilda of Whitby. She was married to St. Ethelhere, who succeeded his brother Anna as King of the East Angles, but reigned only one year, being killed in the wars with Oswy in 655. Having thus become a widow, Hereswitha resolved to embrace the religious life, and for this purpose went to Chelles, at that time in the diocese of Paris. There she was professed, and faithfully persevered in her holy state until death. It was the intention of St. Hilda to have joined her sister, but before she would leave England she was recalled by St. Aidan to establish a monastery of Virgins in Northumbria. (Thomas of Ely says that Hereswitha was the wife of Anna, but there are difficulties which seem to make it impossible. Florence and Malmesbury agree that her husband was Ethelhere.).)
- Saint Regulus (Reol), a monk at Rebais in France with St Philibert, later Archbishop of Rheims and founder of the monastery of Orbais (698)
- Saint Hildebold, first Archbishop of Cologne (818)
- Saint Sandalus (Sandila, Sandolus, Sandulf), a martyr in Cordoba in Spain under the Moors (c. 855)
- Saint Edward the Martyr, Martyr and King of England (978) (see also: March 18 and February 13 - translation of relics)

== Post-Schism Orthodox saints ==
- Saint Ioannicius II, First Serbian Patriarch, Wonderworker (1354) (Note: See: (in Serbian) Свети Јоаникије II. Википедију. (Serbian Wikipedia).)
- Blessed John "the Hairy", Fool-for-Christ of Rostov (1580)
- New Martyr Polydorus of Leucosia, Cyprus, at New Ephesus (1794) (Note: Name days celebrated today include: Polydorus (Πολύδωρος).)
- Venerable Saints Neophytes and Meletios of Stânișoara Monastery

=== New martyrs and confessors ===
- New Hieromartyr Pimen (Belolikov), Bishop of Vernensk and Semirechensk (1918) (Note: See: (in Russian) Пимен (Белоликов). Википедии. (Russian Wikipedia).)
- New Hieromartyr Meletius (Golokolosv), Hieromonk of the Issyk-Kul Holy Trinity Monastery, Kyrgyzstan (1918)
- New Hieromartyrs Sergius Fenomenov, Basil Kolmikov, Philip Shatsky, and Vladimir Dmitrievsky, Priests (1918)
- New Hieromartyrs Basil Krasivsky and Parthenius Krasivsky, Priests (1919)
- New Hieromartyrs Andrew Dalnikov and Theophan Sokolov, Priests (1920)
- New Hieromartyrs Vladimir Sadovsky and Michael Sushkov, Priests (1921)
- New Hieromartyr Nicholas Sushchevsky, Priest (1923)
- New Hieromartyr Euthymius Krygovich, Priest, and 4 martyrs with him (1924)
- New Hieromartyr Romanus Marchenko, Priest (1929)
- New Hieromartyr Alexis Zinoviev, Priest (1937)
- New Hieromartyr Elias Bazhanov, Priest (1937)
- New Hieromartyr Peter Sorokin, Deacon of Alma-Ata (1953)

== Other commemorations ==
- Icon of the Theotokos of Pisidian Sozopolis (608)
- Repose of Priest Peter of Uglich, Fool-for-Christ (1866)
- Translation of the relics (1953) of St. Nektarios (Kephalas) of Aegina, Metropolitan of Pentapolis and Wonderworker (1920)
- Translation of the relics of Venerable Anthimos (Vagianos) of Chios (1960) (Note: His feast day is on February 15.)

== Icon gallery ==
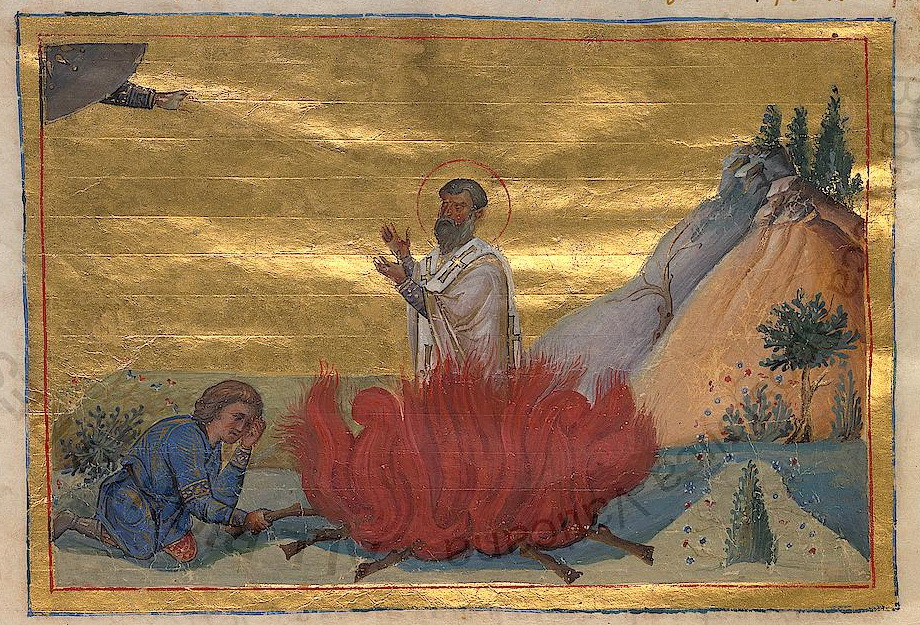
Hieromartyr Aristion of Alexandria (Kelladion), Bishop of Alexandria Scabiosa.
(Menologion of Basil II, 10th century).

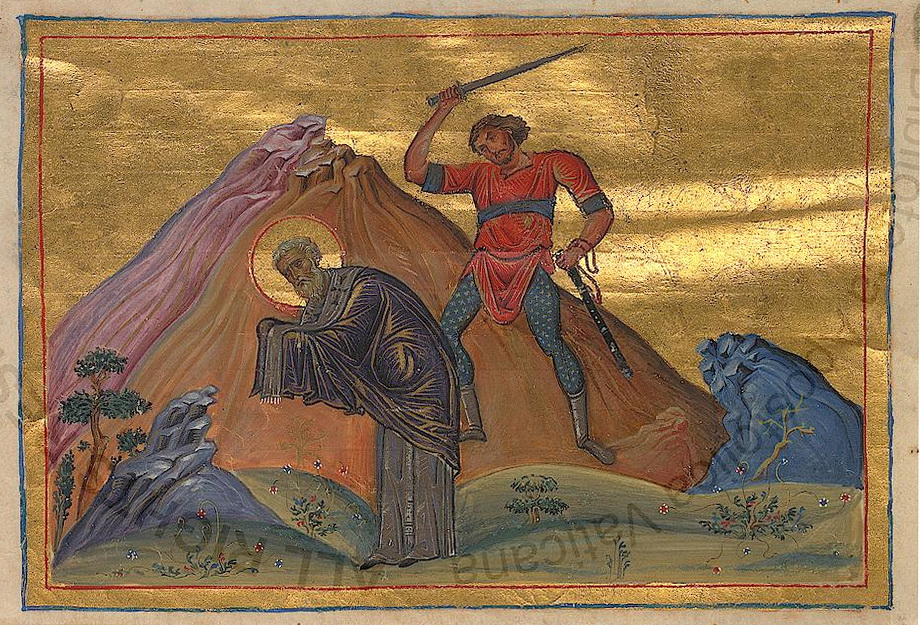
Hieromartyr Anthimus of Nicomedia, Bishop of Nicomedia.
(Menologion of Basil II, 10th century).

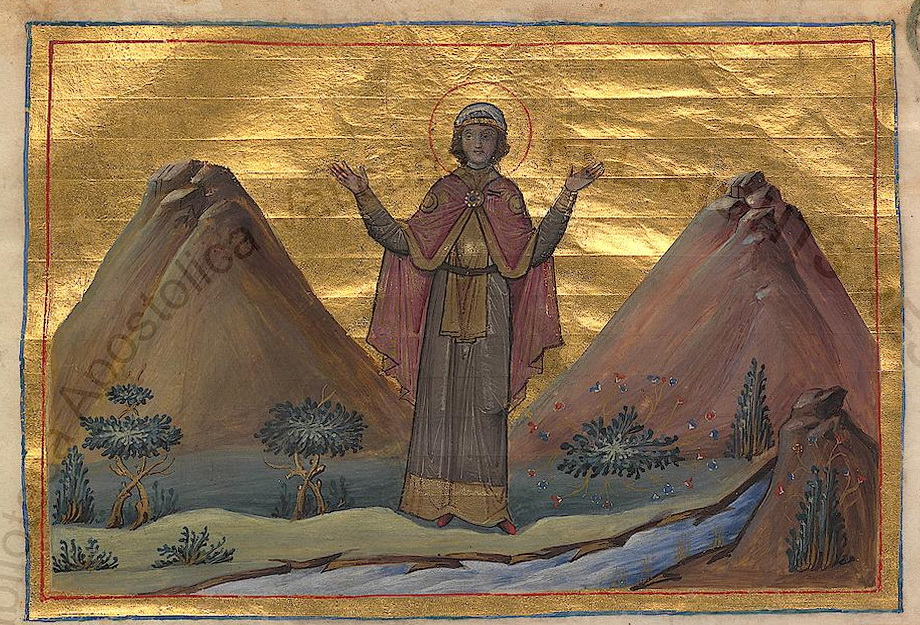
Martyr Basilissa of Nicomedia.
(Menologion of Basil II, 10th century).

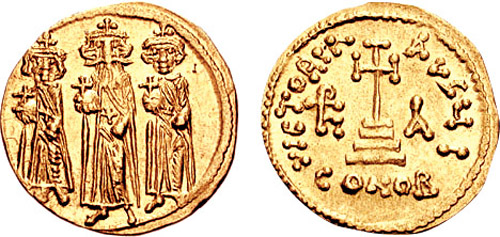
Byzantine coin depicting Constantine the New with his father Heraclius and brother Heraklonas.

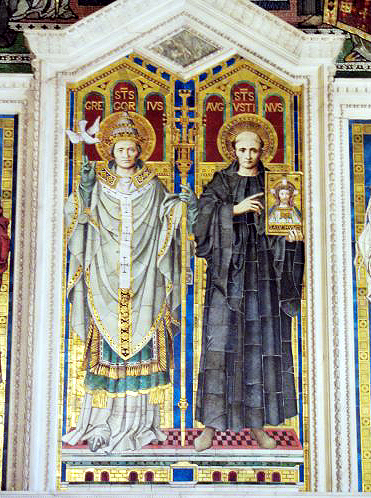
St. Gregory the Dialogist, Pope of Rome, with St. Augustine of Canterbury.

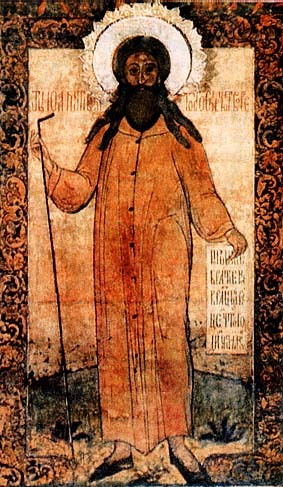
Blessed John "the Hairy", Fool-for-Christ of Rostov.

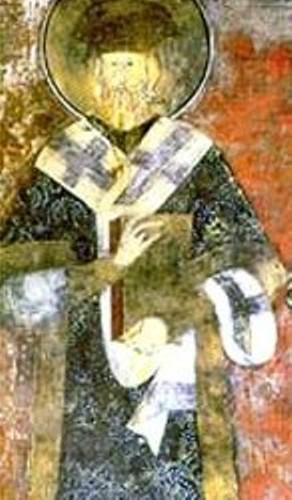
St. Ioannicius II, First Serbian Patriarch.

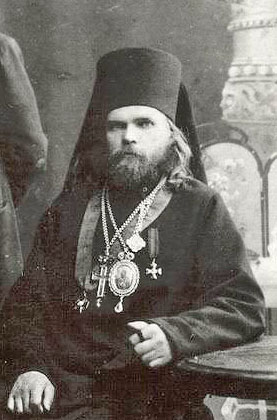
New Hieromartyr Pimen (Belolikov), Bishop of Vernensk and Semirechensk.

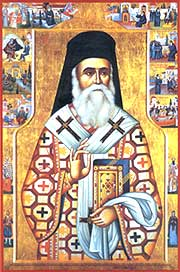
St. Nektarios (Kephalas) of Aegina, Metropolitan of Pentapolis.

== Sources ==
- September 3/September 16. Orthodox Calendar (PRAVOSLAVIE.RU).
- September 16 / September 3. HOLY TRINITY RUSSIAN ORTHODOX CHURCH (A parish of the Patriarchate of Moscow).
- September 3. OCA - The Lives of the Saints.
- The Autonomous Orthodox Metropolia of Western Europe and the Americas (ROCOR). St. Hilarion Calendar of Saints for the year of our Lord 2004. St. Hilarion Press (Austin, TX). p. 65.
- The Third Day of the Month of September. Orthodoxy in China.
- September 3. Latin Saints of the Orthodox Patriarchate of Rome.
- The Roman Martyrology. Transl. by the Archbishop of Baltimore. Last Edition, According to the Copy Printed at Rome in 1914. Revised Edition, with the Imprimatur of His Eminence Cardinal Gibbons. Baltimore: John Murphy Company, 1916. pp. 269–270.
- Rev. Richard Stanton. A Menology of England and Wales, or, Brief Memorials of the Ancient British and English Saints Arranged According to the Calendar, Together with the Martyrs of the 16th and 17th Centuries. London: Burns & Oates, 1892. pp. 434–435.

Greek Sources

- Great Synaxaristes: (in Greek) 3 ΣΕΠΤΕΜΒΡΙΟΥ. ΜΕΓΑΣ ΣΥΝΑΞΑΡΙΣΤΗΣ.
- (in Greek) Συναξαριστής. 3 Σεπτεμβρίου. ECCLESIA.GR. (H ΕΚΚΛΗΣΙΑ ΤΗΣ ΕΛΛΑΔΟΣ).
- (in Greek) 03/09/2026. Ορθόδοξος Συναξαριστής.

Russian Sources

- (in Russian) 16 сентября (3 сентября). Православная Энциклопедия под редакцией Патриарха Московского и всея Руси Кирилла (электронная версия). (Orthodox Encyclopedia - Pravenc.ru).
- (in Russian) 3 сентября по старому стилю / 16 сентября по новому стилю. Русская Православная Церковь - Православный церковный календарь на 2026 год.
