= Agilus =

French monk

Saint Agilus
- Born: c.580 Gaul (modern France)
- Died: c.650 Rebais, France
- Feast: 30 August

Saint Agilus (or Agilo, Ayeul, Aisle, Ail, Aile; c. 580–650) was a Frankish nobleman who became a Christian missionary in Bavaria and later was abbot of Rebais monastery near Paris, France. He was considered a saint, and his feast day is 30 August.

== Life ==
Saint Agilus or Ayeul was from a noble Frankish family, son of Chagnoald and descended from Pharamond and Frotmund. He was educated by Saint Columbanus in Luxeuil Abbey, France. He served as a missionary in Bavaria, Germany. According to tradition, Weltenburg Abbey in Bavaria was founded around 617 AD in the course of the Hiberno-Scottish mission by Agilus and Eustace of Luxeuil, two monks of Luxeuil Abbey. At the council of Clichy on 1 May 636 Agilus was made the first abbot of the Rebais monastery. He died in 650 AD. He was buried in the Saint-Jean church, which became the parish church of the town of Rebais. He was succeeded as abbot by his disciple Saint Filibert.

== Butler's account ==
The hagiographer Alban Butler wrote,

August 30

St. Agilus, commonly called St. Aile, A.

HE was son of Agnoald, one of the principal lords at the court of Childebert II, king of Austrasia and Burgundy. The examples of virtue, which he found in his family, inspired him early with the fear of God. His parents, by the advice of St. Columban, consecrated him to religion in the monastery of Luxeu, where he studied knowledge, and the maxims of perfection, under the holy abbot St. Eustasius; and was no sooner of age to practise the rule than he distinguished himself by his fervour, his humility, and the austerity of his penance. Agil’s father dying, St. Columban, now without a protector at court, lay open to a violent persecution from Queen Brunehault, enraged against the saint for refusing women an entrance into his monastery. The persecution extended also to his disciples, who were commanded to quit their retreats. St. Agil on this occasion solicited an audience of King Thierri. He was graciously received; at his suit a stop was put to the ill effects of Brunehault’s animosity; and the statute of St. Columban’s rule regarding women was confirmed. Some years after, the bishops sent to St. Agil and St. Eustatius to preach the gospel to infidels who lived on the further side of Mount-jura. The two apostolical men penetrated into Bavaria; and their mission was attended with the happiest success. At their return, St. Agil resumed his penitential exercises with the usual exactness; but was soon taken out of his retreat to govern the monastery of Rebais, which St. Owen, chancellor of France, had founded in the diocess of Meaux. He was appointed first abbot of it at a meeting of bishops in Clichy, in 636. The saint caused the strictest regularity to be observed at Rebais, till he died, about the year 650, in the sixty-sixth year of his age. He is mentioned in the Benedictin Martyrology. See his life by an anonymous writer, published by Mabillon, Act. SS. Ben., t. 2, and by Chifflet, Histoire de l’Abbaye de Tournus; Bulteau, Hist. de l’Ordre de Saint Benoit, l. 3, c. 14, and Baillet on the 30th of August.

== Sources ==
- Altmann, Lothar (2012), Benediktinerabtei Weltenburg an der Donau (German), Schnell & Steiner-Verlag, Regensburg, ISBN 978-3-7954-4248-4
- Baus, Karl; Beck, Hans-Georg; Ewig, Eugen; Vogt, Hermann Josef; Biggs, Anselm (tr.) (1980), History of the Church: The imperial church from Constantine to the Early Middle Ages, London: Burns & Oates, ISBN 9780860120858
- Butler, Alban (1833), The Lives of the Fathers, Martyrs, and Other Principal Saints: Compiled from Original Monuments and Other Authentic Records, Illustrated with the Remarks of Judicious Modern Critics and Historians, R. Coyne
- Guérin, Louis François (1854), Dictionnaire de l'histoire universelle de l'Eglise (in French), Migne
- "Saint Agilus", CatholicSaints.info
- Starr, Brian Daniel (2013-05-24), Dictionary of Saints, Xlibris Corporation, ISBN 978-1-4836-3600-9
