= Basilissa (name) =

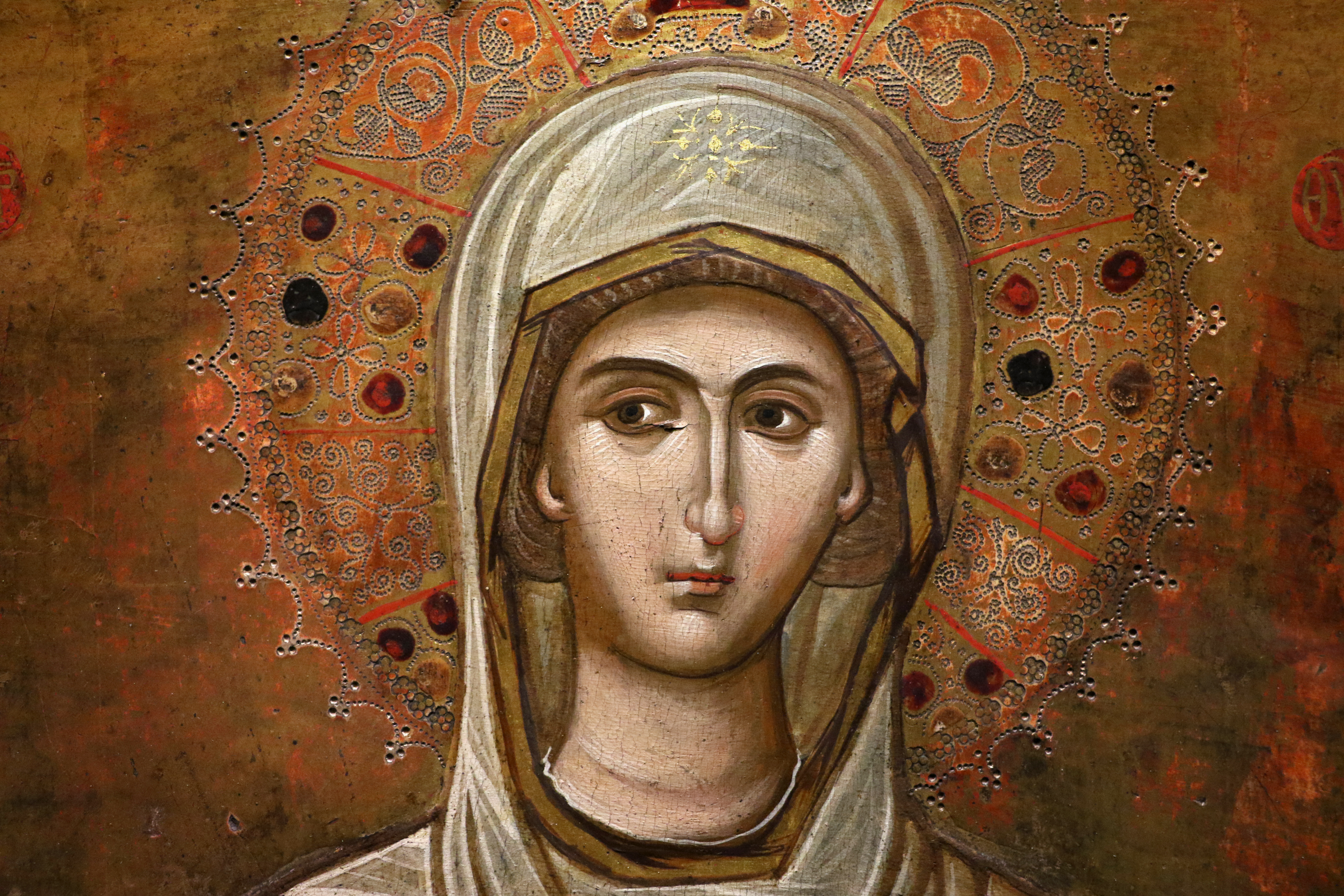
Madonna Basilissa (Pinacoteca Vaticana)

Basilissa or Vasilissa (Greek :Βασίλισσα) is a female first name, derived from the title Basilissa.

The name may refer to:

- Basilissa of Saints Basilissa and Anastasia (died 68 AD), Christian martyr
- Basilissa of Saints Callinica and Basilissa (died 252 AD), Christian martyr
- Basilissa of Saints Julian and Basilissa (died c. 304 AD), Christian martyr
- Basilla of Rome (died 257 AD), Christian martyr
- Vasilissa (child martyr), early 4th century
- A spelling variant of Vasilisa (name)

== See also ==
- Basilinna
