= Vasilissa =

Vasilissa may refer to:

- Vasilissa (child martyr)
- Vasilissa (phasmid), a genus of the Acanthoxylini tribe of stick insects
- Alternative spelling of Vasilisa (name)
- Alternative spelling of Basilissa, a Greek title similar to "queen" of "empress"
- Alternative spelling of Basilissa (name)
- Vasilissa (album), a 2017 album by Eleni Foureira

== See also ==
- Vasilissa ergo gaude
