= Callinicus =

Callinicus or Kallinikos (Ancient Greek: Καλλίνικος) is a surname or male given name; the feminine form is Callinice or Callinica (Ancient Greek: Καλλινίκη). It is of Greek origin, meaning "beautiful victor", "the one that achieves a beautiful victory" or "beautifully triumphant".

== People named Callinicus ==
=== Seleucid rulers ===
- Seleucus II Callinicus (r. 246–225 BC)
- Antiochus VIII Grypus
- Antiochus XII Dionysus
- Antiochus XIII Asiaticus

=== Kingdom of Commagene ===
- King Mithridates I Callinicus, who married the daughter of Antiochus VIII Grypus
- Callinicus (Prince of Commagene), a prince of Commagene who lived in the 1st century

=== Religious figures ===
- Callinicus, the supposed father of the tannaic scholar Onkelos
- Callinicus, the author of the Vita Sancti Hypatii
- Callinicus of Pelusium, a 4th-century bishop, imprisoned by Saint Athanasius of Alexandria
- Martyrs of the Eastern Church:
  - Saint Callinicus (c. 2nd century), martyred together with Meletius Stratelates and many others
  - Callinicus of Phrygia (died 251), martyred together with Leukios and Saint Thyrsus
  - Saint Callinica (or Callinicus), beheaded in Rome in 252
  - Callinicus of Gangra (c. 4th century), martyred in Gangra (modern Çankırı)
- Patriarch Callinicus I of Constantinople (r. 693–705), a saint of the Eastern Orthodox Church
- Patriarch Callinicus II of Constantinople (r. 1688, 1689–1693, 1694–1702)
- Patriarch Callinicus III of Constantinople (r. 1726), died before being enthroned and sometimes not counted among the patriarchs
- Patriarch Callinicus IV of Constantinople (or III) (r. 1757), numbered III when the previous patriarch is not counted
- Patriarch Callinicus V of Constantinople (or IV) (r. 1801–1806, 1808–1809)
- Serbian Patriarch Kalinik I (r. 1691–1710)
- Serbian Patriarch Kalinik II (r. 1765–1766)
- Patriarch Callinicus of Alexandria (r. 1858–1861)

=== Other historical figures ===
- Callinicus (sophist) (c. 3rd century), Greek historian
- Callinicus (eunuch), praepositus sacri cubiculi (chamberlain) and sole witness of the death of Byzantine emperor Justinian I in 565, who designated Justin II as successor
- Callinicus (exarch), Exarch of Ravenna (r. 597–602 or 603)
- Callinicus of Heliopolis (c. 7th century), Byzantine chemist credited with inventing Greek fire

=== Modern individuals ===
- Jannis Kallinikos (born 1954), organization theorist at the London School of Economics
- Alex Callinicos (born 1950), political theorist at King's College London and Trotskyist leader

== Places ==
- Callinicum, a city founded by Seleucus II Callinicus, now modern Raqqa, Syria
  - Battle of Callinicum (531), victory of the Sassanid Persians over the Byzantines
