= Danube Gorge (Weltenburg) =

Gorge in Weltenburg, Kelheim, Germany

Danube Gorge/ Weltenburg Narrows (Weltenburger Enge)
- IUCN category IV (habitat/species management area)
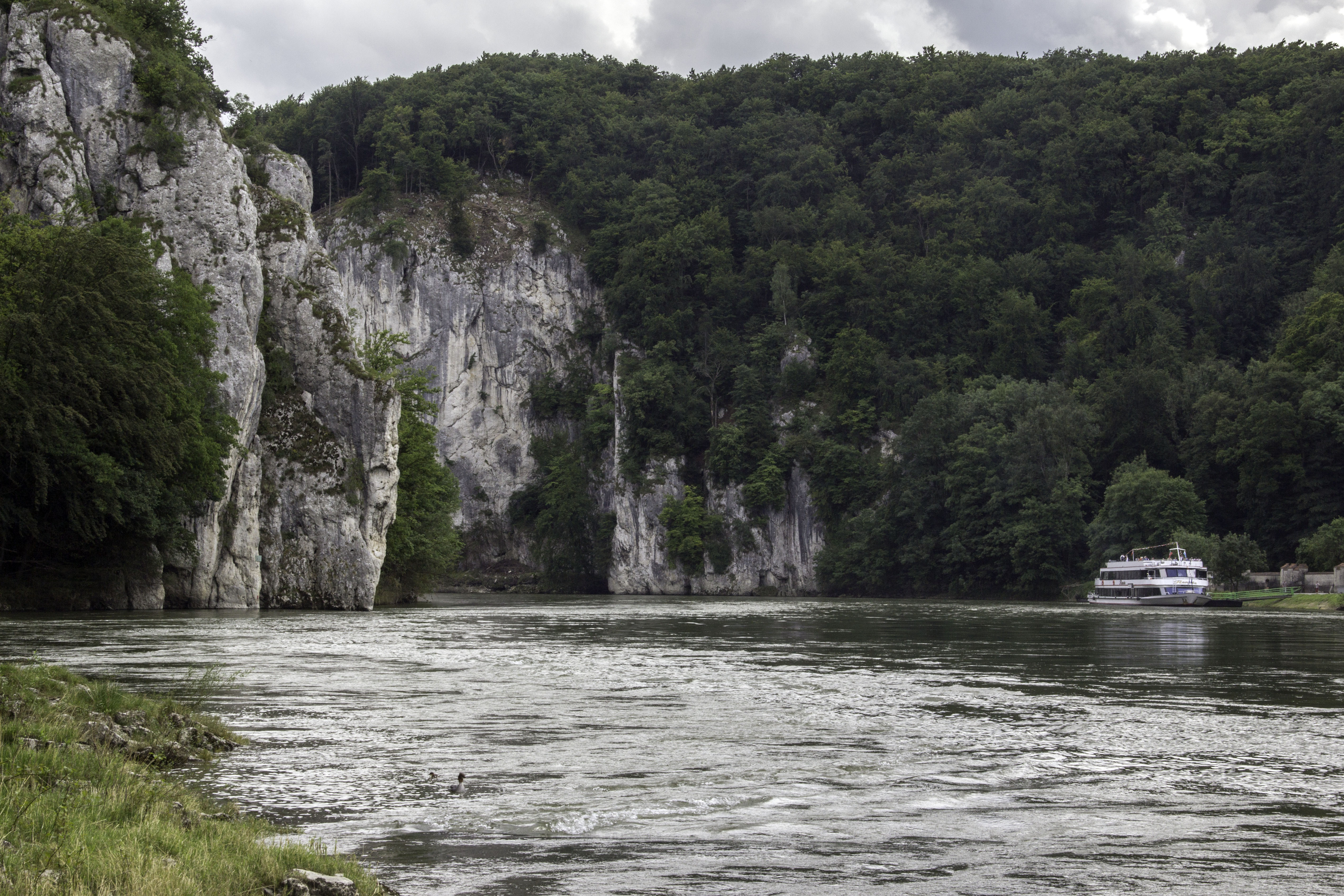
- The Weltenburg Narrows near Weltenburg Abbey
- Interactive map of Danube Gorge/ Weltenburg Narrows (Weltenburger Enge)
- Location: Kelheim, Lower Bavaria, Bavaria, Germany
- Coordinates: 48°54′01″N 11°49′49″E
- Area: 5.6
- Designation: NSG200.002 (NSG-00089.01)
- Established: 11 May 1970

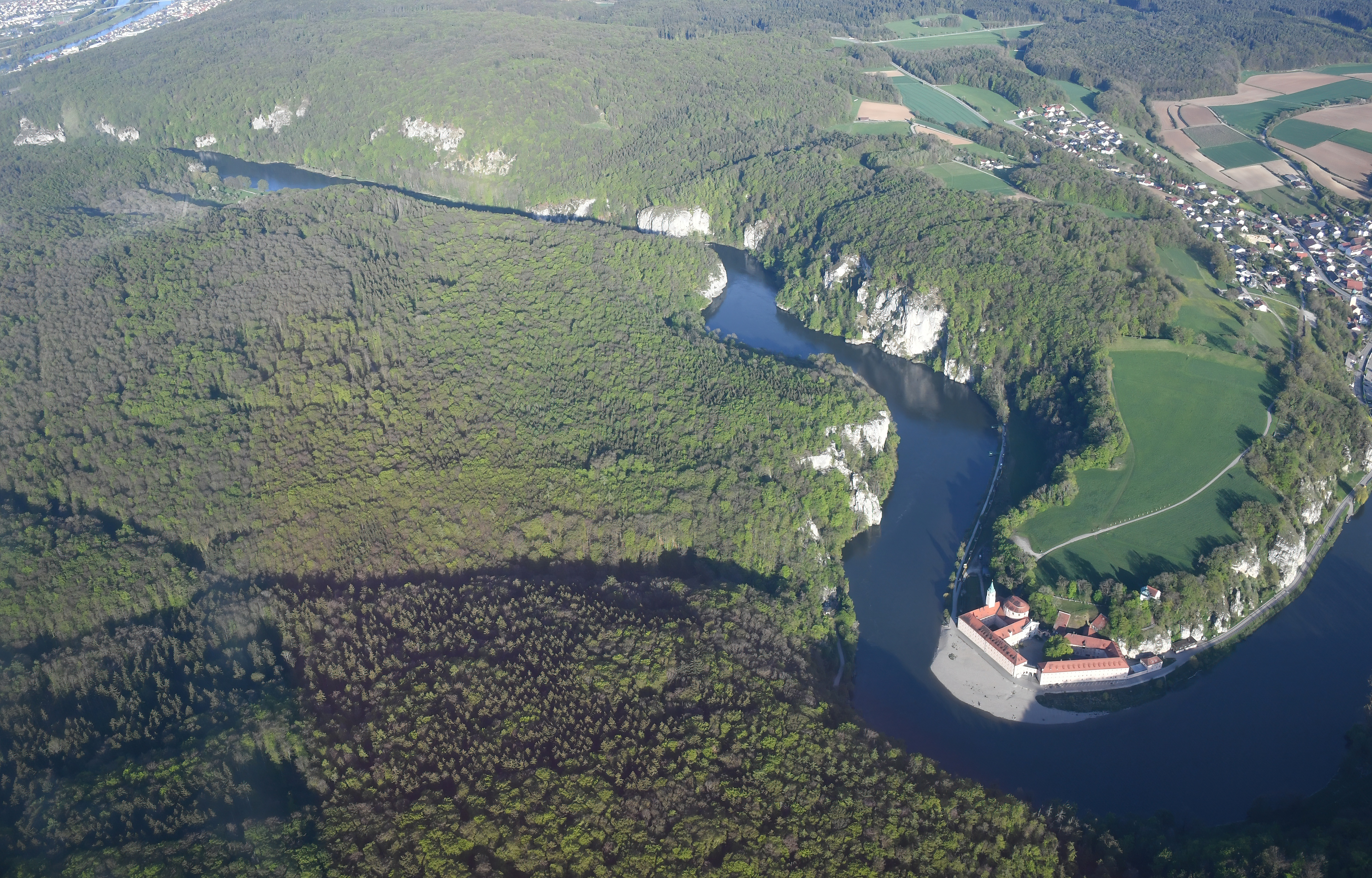
Aerial image of the Danube Gorge near Weltenburg. The Weltenburg Abbey can be seen in the bottom right corner of the image

The Danube Gorge near Weltenburg (German: Donaudurchbruch bei Weltenburg) is a narrow section of the Danube Valley in the Lower Bavarian county of Kelheim, which has been recognised as a nature reserve and geotope. This section of the valley in the southern Franconian Jura is officially called the Weltenburg Narrows (Weltenburger Enge).

== Location ==
The Weltenburg Narrows lies on the Lower Bavarian section of the River Danube between the town of Kelheim and Weltenburg Abbey. The nature reserve covers an area of about 560 hectares, is 5.5 kilometres long and about 400 metres wide.

== Description ==
The area is a designated nature reserve and bears the cadastre number NSG200.002. The area was designated as a natural monument under King Ludwig I of Bavaria as early as 1840. The nature reserve, which has existed since 1938, was awarded the European Diploma on 5 March 1978. It is part of the Natura 2000 network and the protected area of DE7136301, Weltenburg Narrows and Hirschberg and Altmühlleiten.

In addition, the area is also geotope no. 273R005. In 2002 the Weltenburg Narrows was awarded an official seal by the Bavarian Minister for the Environment for being one of Bavaria's most beautiful geotopes. In 2006 The Danube Gorge was listed among the 77 outstanding national geotopes of Germany.

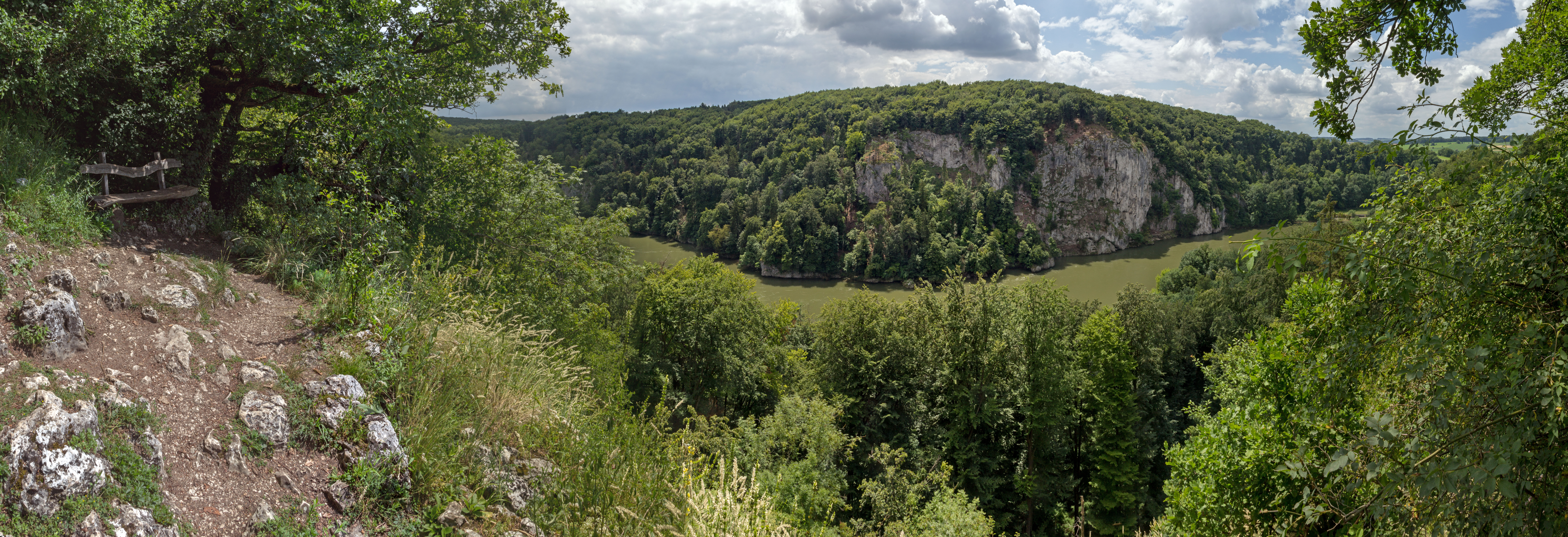
The central highlight of the Weltenburg Narrows, panoramic view from the north bank, 2013

Geologically the Weltenburg Narrows belong to the Upper Jurassic (limestone), and therefore the most fossil-rich formations in Germany, which was laid down about 150 million years ago when the area was still a shallow sea.

The gorge is enclosed on either side by rock faces up to 80 metres high, pierced by numerous small caves. Between the so-called Stillen and the rocks of the Lange Wand (Long Wall) the river narrows by up to 110 metres and attains a depth of 20 metres. The limestone formations bear sometimes fantastical names such as The Three Warring Brothers (Die drei feindlichen Brüder), Pirate Rock (Räuberfelsen), Kuchel Rock (Kuchelfelsen), Petrified Virgin (Versteinerte Jungfrau), Bavarian Lion (Bayerischer Löwe), Bishop's Mitre (Bischofsmütze), Two People Kissing (Zwei Sich-Küssende), Roman Rocks (Römerfelsen), Peter and Paul (Peter und Paul), Beehive (Bienenhaus) (a rock with holes like a honeycomb), Napoleon's Suitcase (Napoleons Reisekoffer, which he is supposed to have left behind during his retreat to France).

By contrast with the enormous water depth at the site of the actual gorge, there is a less striking stretch of river about halfway between Kelheim and Weltenburg, the so-called Wipfelsfurt. This is the shallowest point in the Danube between Ingolstadt and Regensburg. The bowl was probably formed by a meteorite during the Ries event 15 million years ago.

== Gallery ==
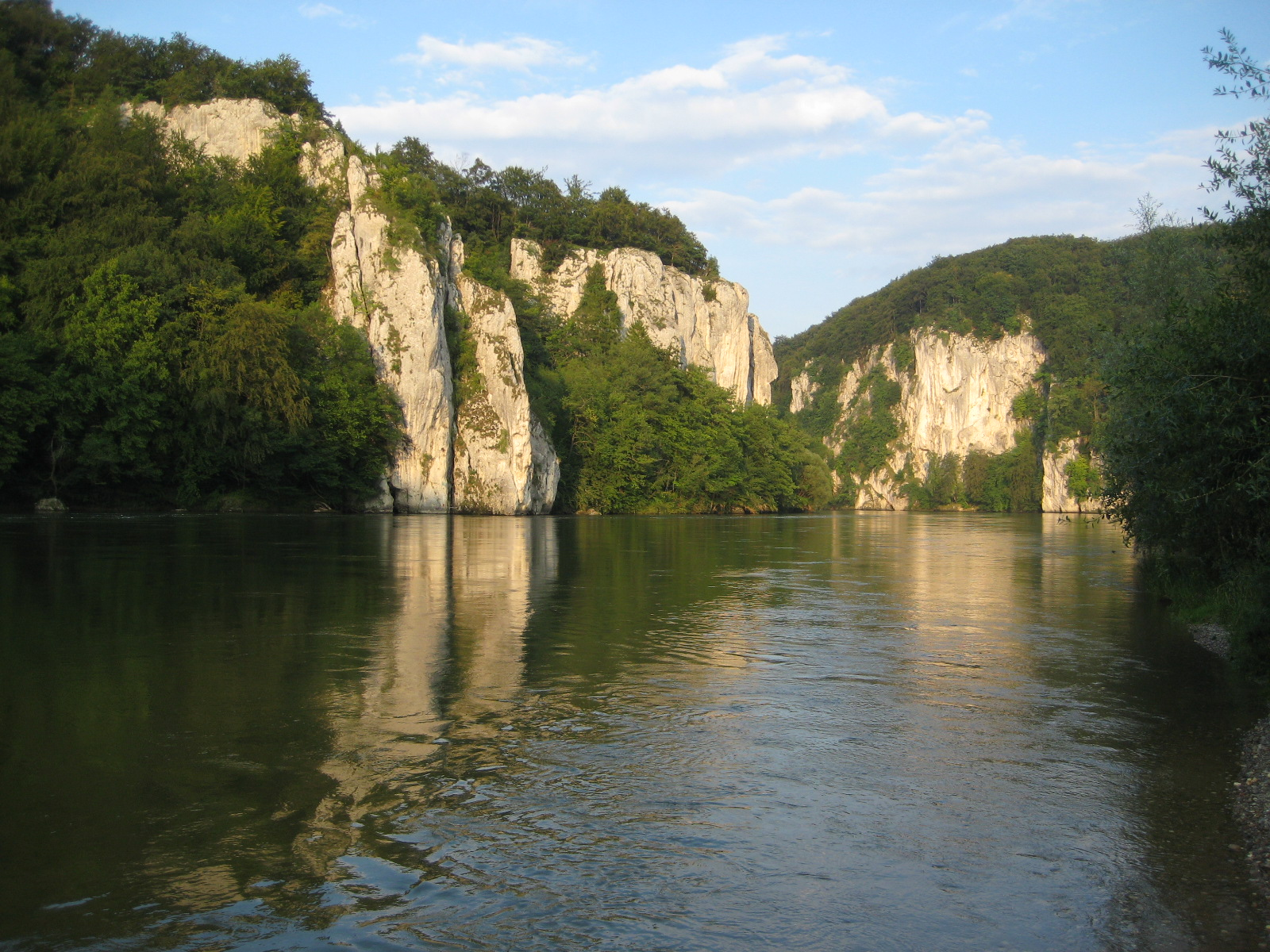
View of the Danube Gorge from Weltenburg Abbey

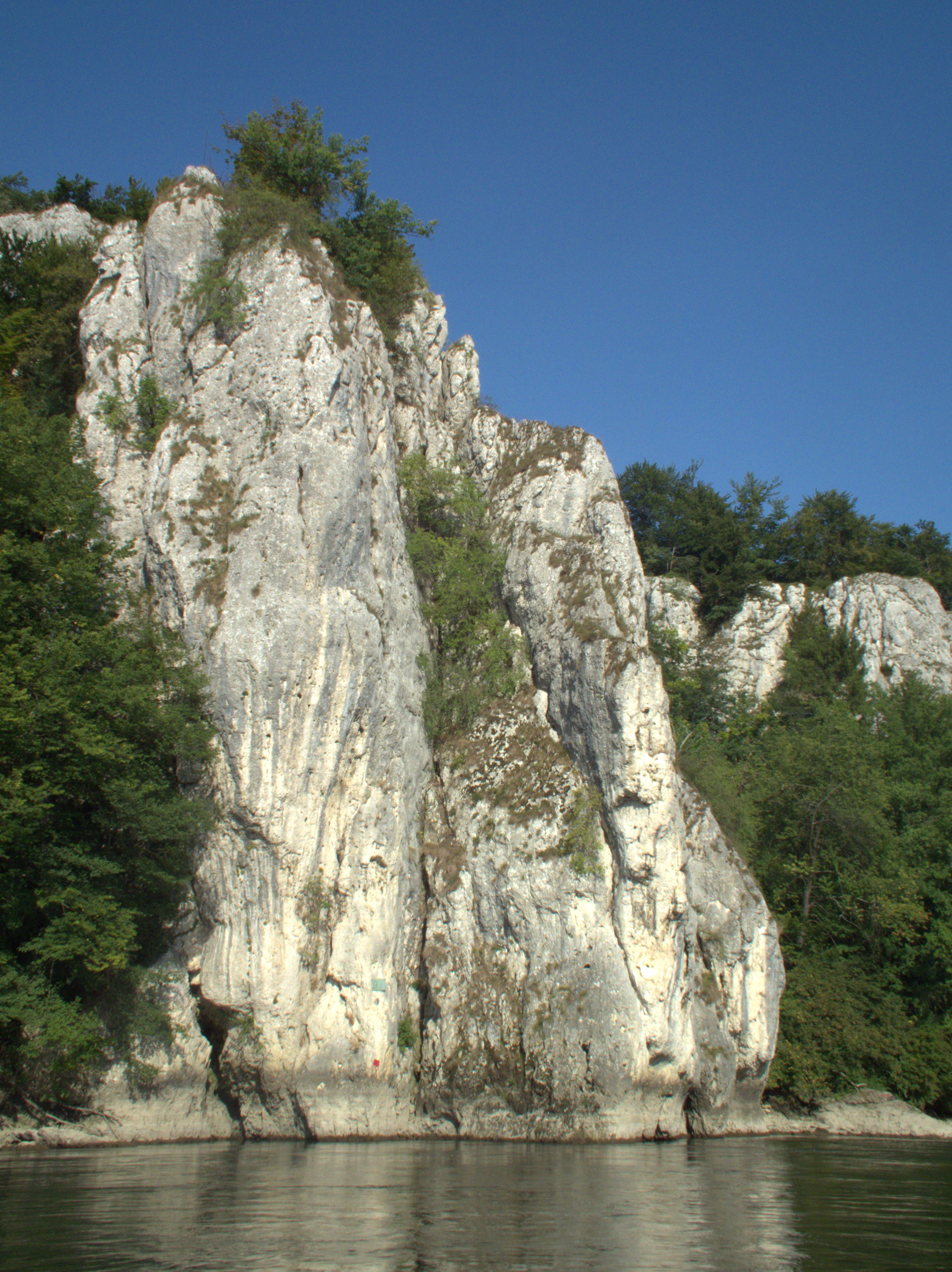
Striking rock formation (the Bavarian Lion) in the actual gorge

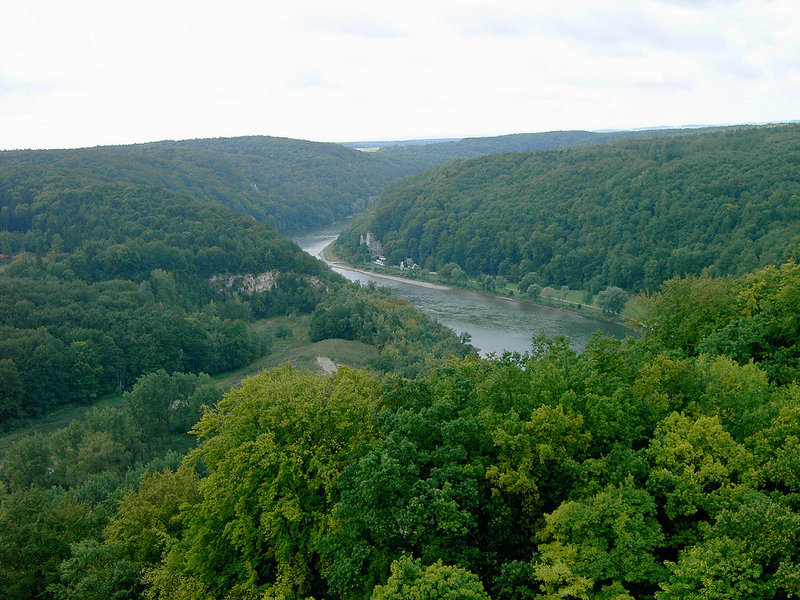
Overview of the gorge areas from the Michelsberg

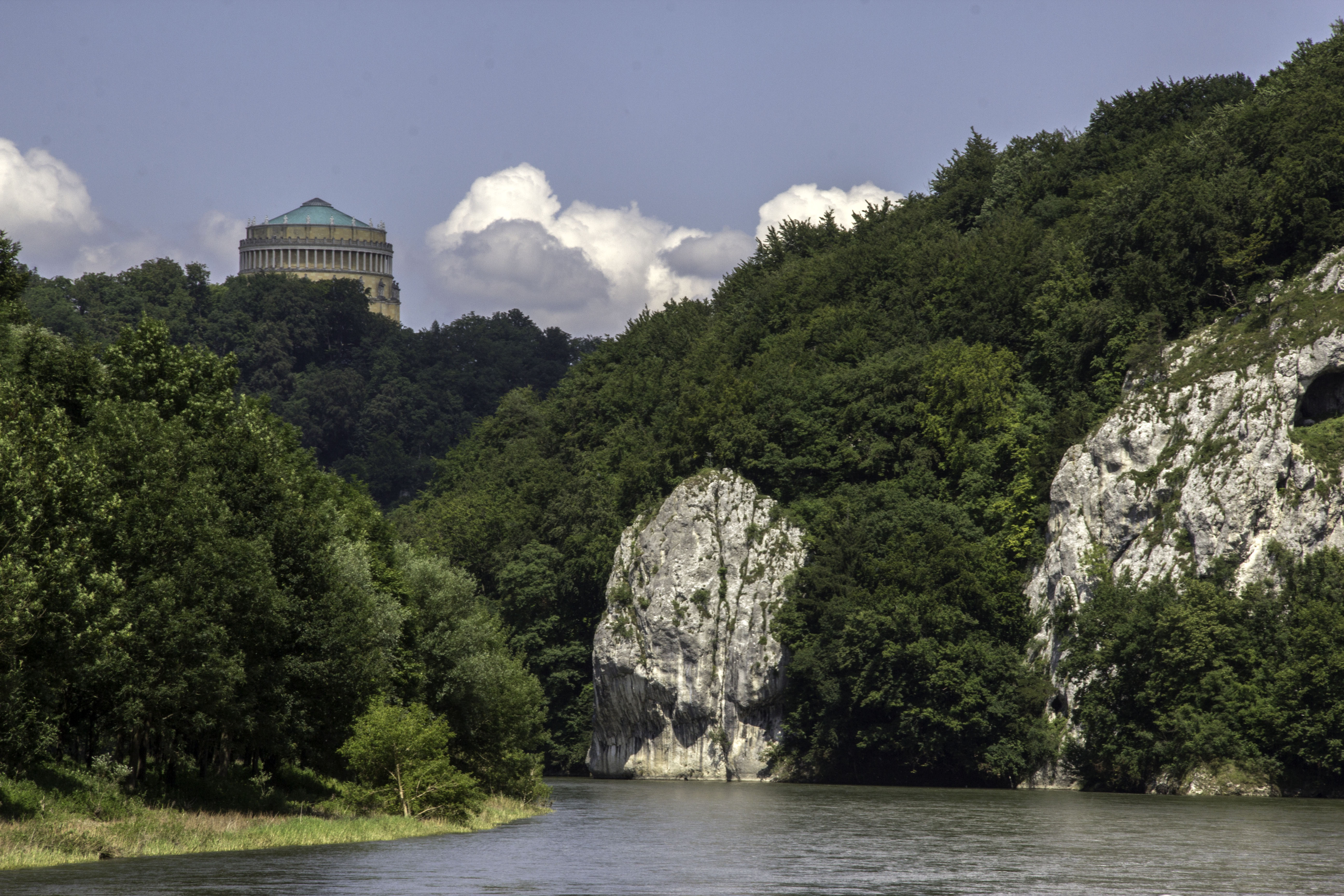
View through the Danube Gorge of Liberation Hall (Befreiungshalle)

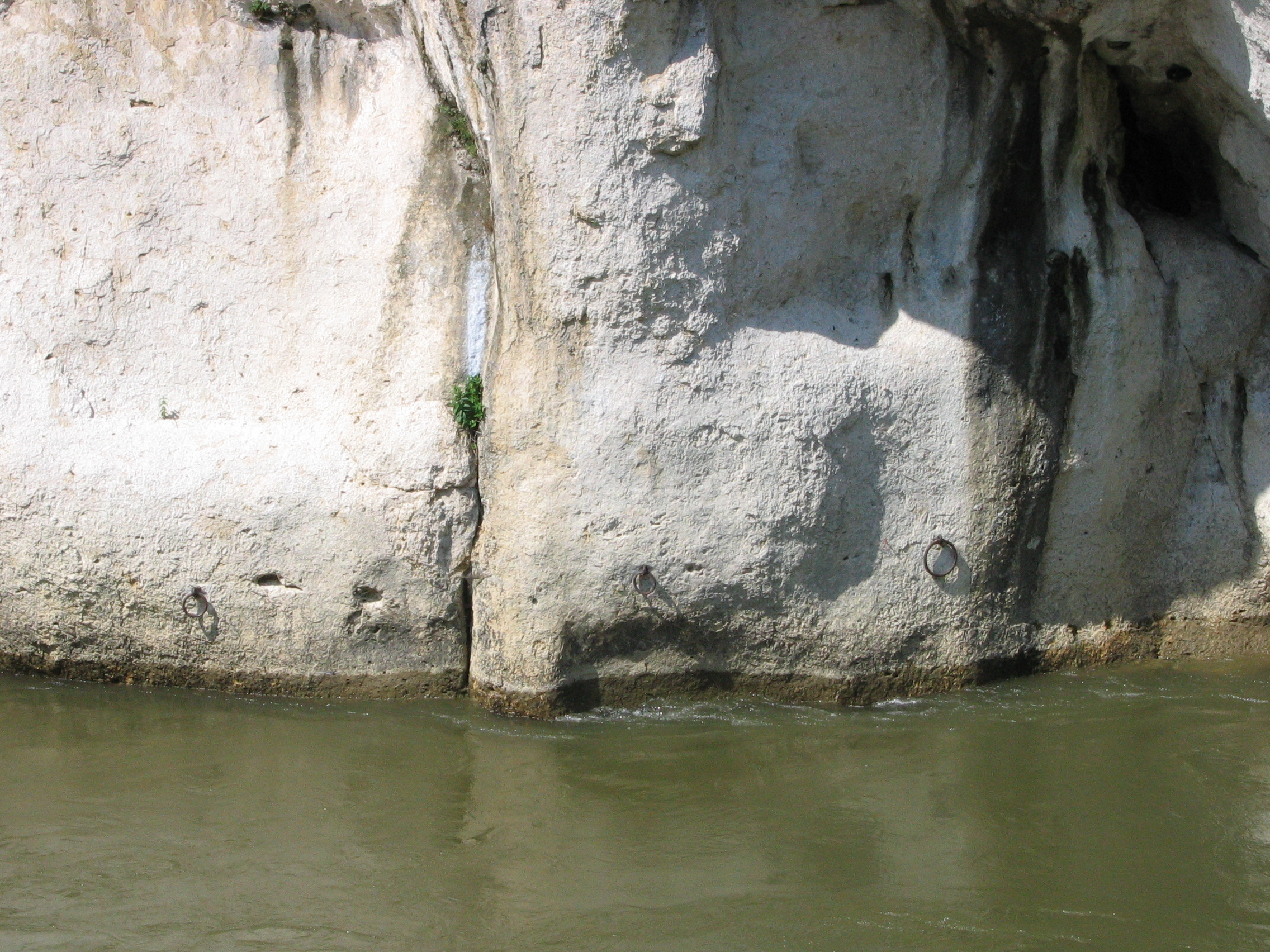
In the Long Wall (Lange Wand), the most dangerous gorge rock, there are rings once used to assist boats travelling upstream.

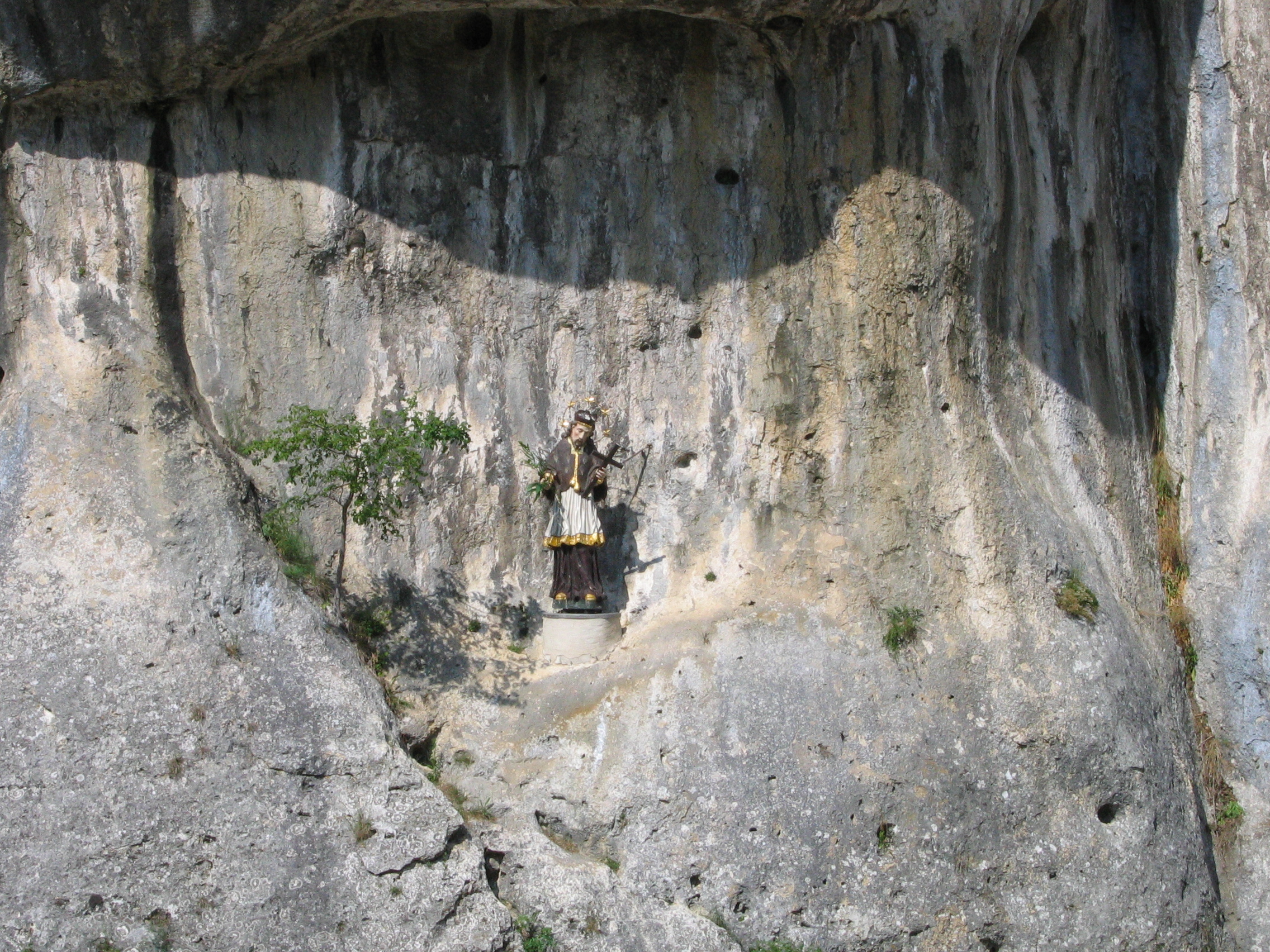
The patron saint, St. Nepomuk, on the Long Wall

== See also ==
- Iron Gates – a gorge on the Danube near Orșova, Romania
