= Martyrs of Nicomedia =

Christian victims of a massacre in Nicomedia

Saints 20,000 Martyrs of Nicomedia
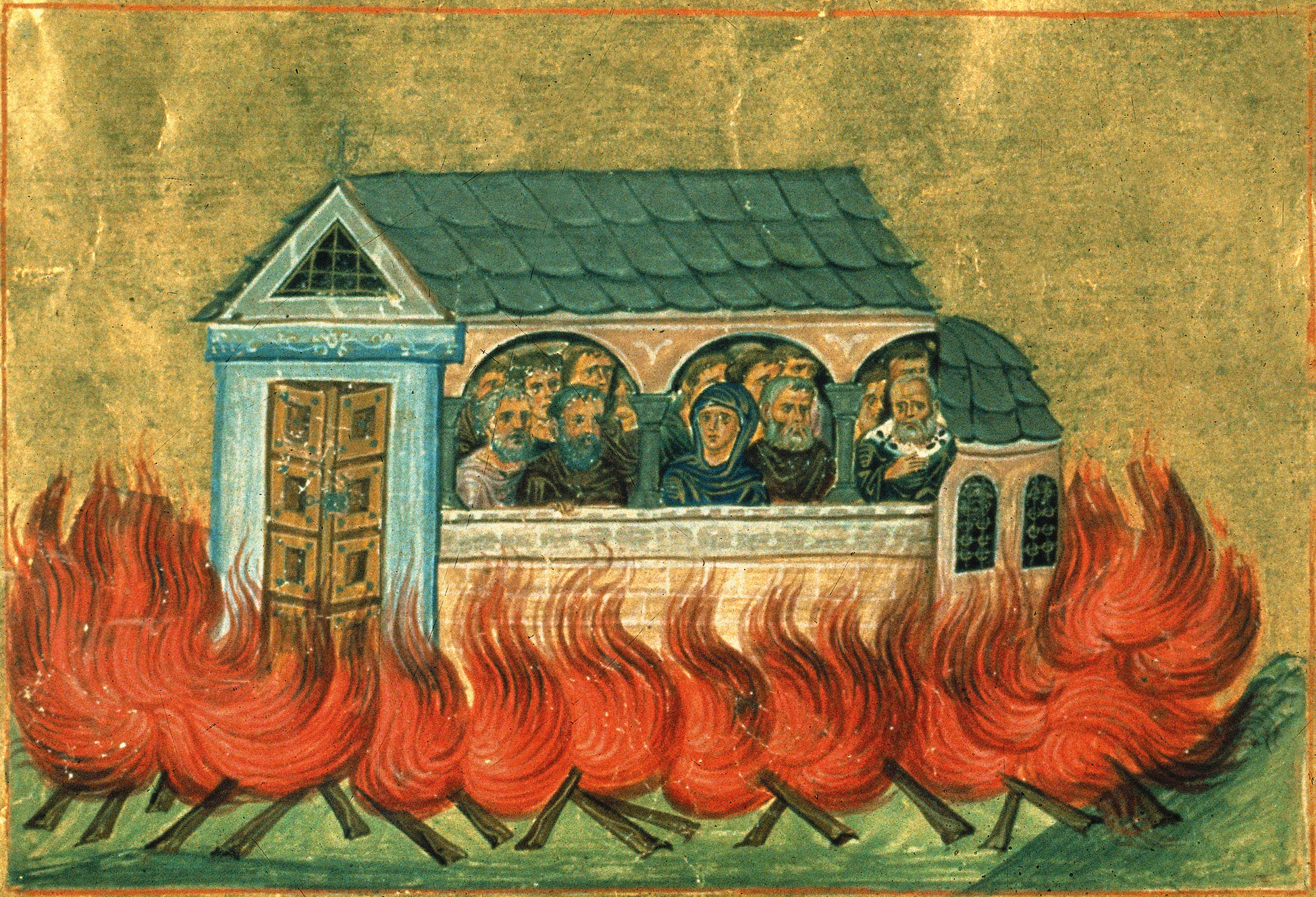
- Miniature depicting the martyrs from the Menologion of Basil II

Martyrs
- Died: c. 304; Nicomedia, Bithynia, Eastern Roman Empire (modern-day İzmit, Turkey)
- Venerated in: Catholic Church; Eastern Orthodox Church; Oriental Orthodox Church; Some Lutheran Churches
- Canonized: Pre-congregation
- Feast: 28 December (Eastern Churches); 23 June (Roman Martyrology)
- Attributes: Crown of martyrdom, Martyr's palm
- Patronage: Persecuted Christians

The Martyrs of Nicomedia were Christians traditionally believed to have been killed in the Roman city of Nicomedia during the persecution of Christians in the Roman Empire. According to Christian tradition, thousands of Christians were killed in the city during the early fourth century after refusing to renounce their faith or offer sacrifices to the Roman gods. The events are usually connected with the final phase of the Diocletianic Persecution, often referred to by historians as the Great Persecution, the most extensive persecution of Christians in the Roman Empire prior to the legalization of Christianity under Constantine the Great.

Later Byzantine traditions describe a particularly large massacre occurring on Christmas Day in 304 AD, when a large gathering of Christians celebrating the Nativity of Jesus was reportedly killed after refusing to participate in pagan sacrificial rites. The number of victims recorded in Christian sources varies widely. Some accounts describe several thousand victims, while later liturgical texts refer to 20,000 martyrs who died in Nicomedia. Modern historians generally treat the larger number as symbolic or hagiographical rather than a precise historical count.

== Background ==
During the late third and early fourth centuries the city of Nicomedia served as one of the principal imperial residences of the Roman Empire and functioned as an administrative center for the eastern provinces under the emperor Diocletian. Because of its political importance, the city became one of the earliest locations where the anti-Christian laws of the Diocletianic persecution were enforced.

According to the historian Eusebius of Caesarea, the persecution began in Nicomedia in 303 AD when Roman authorities ordered the destruction of the principal Christian church in the city and the burning of Christian scriptures.

The imperial edicts issued during the persecution required Christians throughout the empire to offer sacrifices to the traditional Roman gods and participate in public ceremonies honoring the deities of the Roman state religion. Christians who refused were frequently imprisoned, tortured, or executed. As a result, many Christian communities in the eastern provinces experienced severe repression during this period.

== Massacre ==
According to later Byzantine Christian tradition, a large number of Christians gathered in Nicomedia during the celebration of the Nativity of Jesus. Roman authorities reportedly demanded that those assembled offer sacrifices to the Roman gods. When the Christians refused to renounce their faith in Jesus Christ, Roman soldiers are said to have surrounded the gathering.

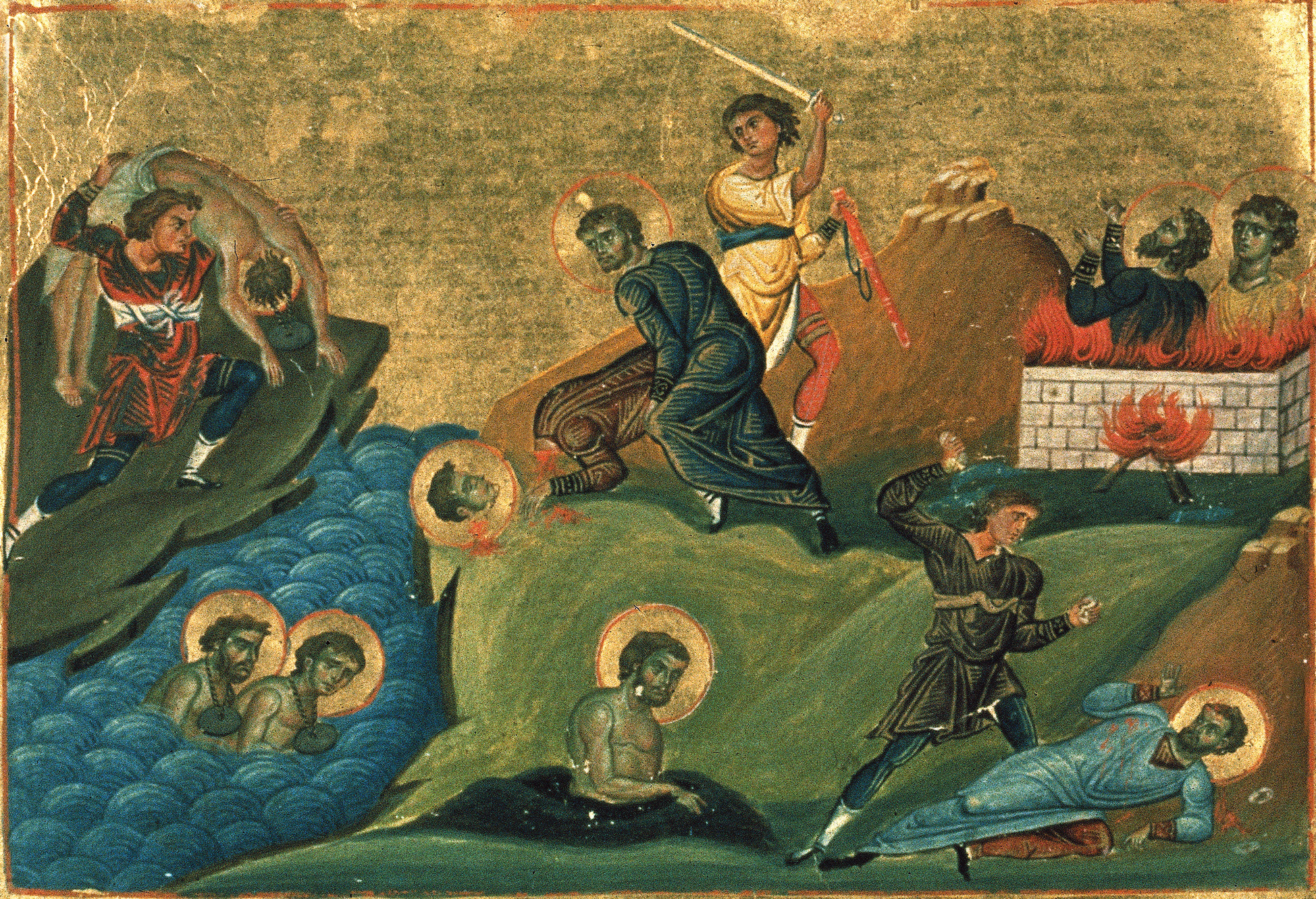
Anthimus of Nicomedia and companions depicted in the Menologion of Basil II

According to hagiographical accounts, many believers were executed through methods including burning, drowning, and beheading. Some traditions state that a large group of Christians were gathered inside a church when Roman soldiers set the building on fire after the worshippers refused to sacrifice to the Roman gods.

Later Christian martyrologies describe the events in Nicomedia as one of the most severe episodes associated with the Great Persecution.

=== Associated martyrs and saints ===
Several individual Christians associated with the persecutions in Nicomedia are commemorated as saints in Christian tradition. Among the most prominent is Anthimus of Nicomedia, the bishop of the city, who according to Christian sources was eventually captured and beheaded.

Other martyrs associated with the persecutions include Saint Gorgonius, a Christian official in the imperial household. Eastern Christian tradition also commemorates Domna of Nicomedia, a convert who was executed during the persecution, and Saint Vasilissa, a child martyr who according to hagiographical sources was later executed for refusing to renounce Christianity. These figures, along with many unnamed believers, are collectively commemorated as the 20,000 Martyrs of Nicomedia.

== Historical sources ==
The persecutions in Nicomedia are described in early Christian historical works, particularly those of Eusebius of Caesarea and Lactantius. These authors record the destruction of churches, the burning of Christian scriptures, and the arrest and execution of Christians who refused to comply with imperial religious policies.

Later Byzantine synaxaria and liturgical texts expanded these accounts and described the martyrdom of large numbers of Christians in the city. Modern historians generally agree that Nicomedia was a major center of persecution during the early fourth century.

However, the traditional number of 20,000 martyrs is widely regarded by scholars as symbolic or exaggerated. Historians such as W. H. C. Frend note that many numerical figures in early martyr literature reflect later hagiographical development rather than precise historical counts. Similarly, the historian G. E. M. de Ste. Croix argues that numerical estimates in martyr narratives often serve theological or literary purposes rather than representing reliable demographic data.

== Veneration ==
The martyrs are commemorated in several Christian traditions. In the Eastern Orthodox Church and the Byzantine Catholic Churches, their collective feast day is celebrated on 28 December. In the Roman Martyrology of the Catholic Church, the martyrs of Nicomedia are commemorated on 23 June.

The story of the martyrs appears in Byzantine liturgical texts and iconography, including illustrations preserved in the Menologion of Basil II.

== See also ==
- Great Persecution
- Persecution of Christians in the Roman Empire
- Forty Martyrs of Sebaste
- Ten Thousand Martyrs
- Menologion of Basil II
