= Basilla of Rome =

Saint Basilla of Rome

Martyr
- Born: Rome
- Died: 257; Rome
- Venerated in: Catholic Church
- Feast: May 20

Basilla of Rome, also known as Basilissa and Babilla, was a saint and martyr of the 3rd century. According to myth she was born into a Roman noble family and was a niece of the emperor Gallienus. She was beheaded in 257 under the Roman emperor Valerian because she refused to marry Pompeius (or Pompey), a patrician and pagan described as "a man of equal rank" to her, after she converted to Christianity. She was baptized by Pope Cornelius. Her maid accused her of being a Christian, and Pompeius betrayed her to Valerian when "she remained steadfast in her refusal to marry him".

Basilla was buried in the cemetery and catacombs of Saint Hermes on the Salarian Way near Rome. Hagiographer Agnes Dunbar states that Basilla was buried in a cemetery that she owned, which may have been named for her or for the other martyrs buried there. In the 9th century, her body was moved to the Basilica of Santa Prassede. In 1654, her relics were found and buried at the Hôtel-Dieu de Bayeux. Saint Basillia's feast day is May 20.
