= Vasilisa Volokhova =

Russian noblewoman (c. 1591)

Vasilisa Volokhova (floruit 1591; Russian: Василиса Волохова) was a Russian noblewoman and courtier, the royal governess and nurse of Prince Dmitry of Uglich. She was said to have participated in the murder of the prince in 1591.
