= Weltenburg Abbey =

Benedictine monastery in Bavaria, Germany

- Kloster Weltenburg
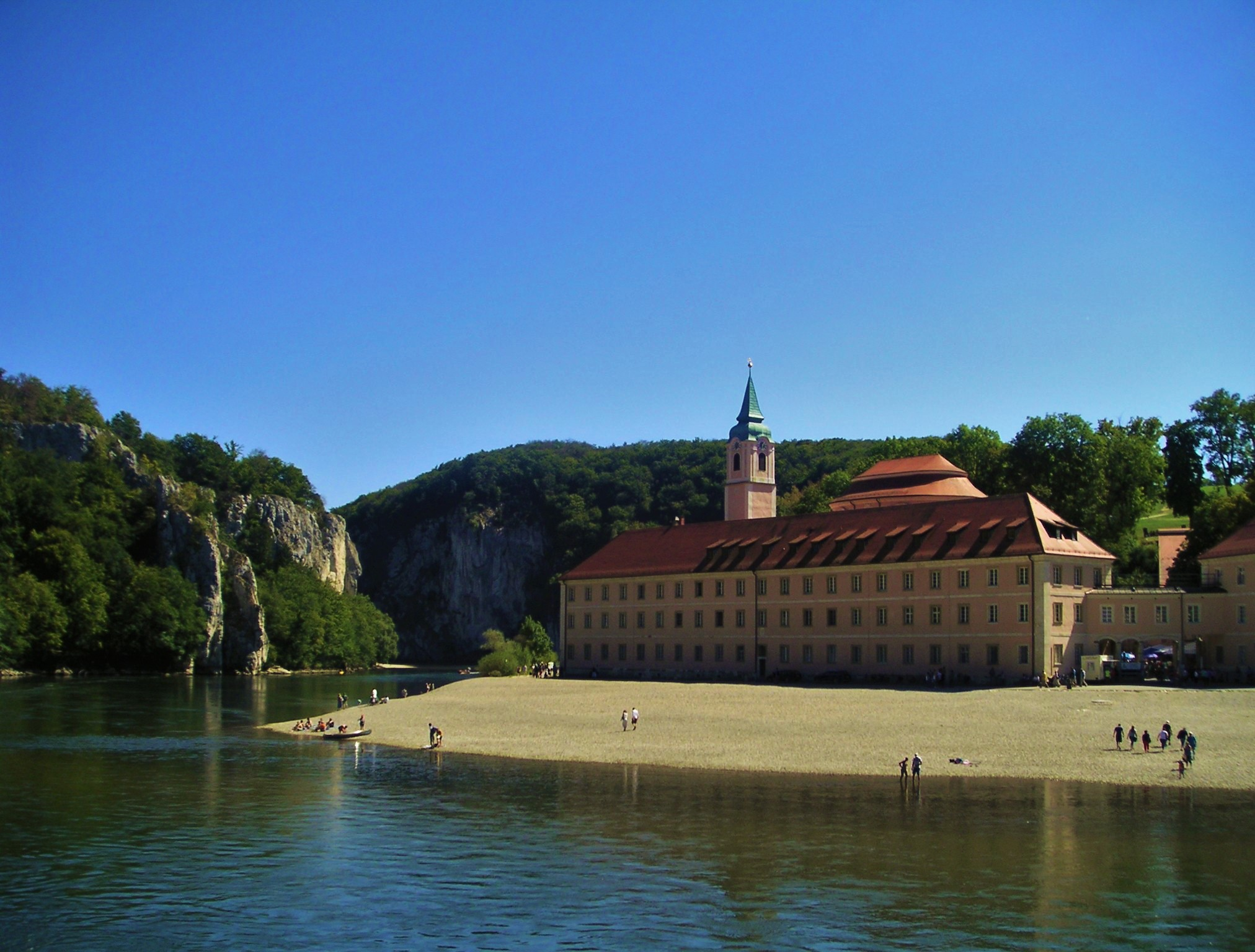
- Weltenburg Abbey as seen across the Danube

- Location within Bavaria Location within Germany

Monastery information
- Order: Benedictines
- Established: 7th century, 1842
- Disestablished: 1803
- Dedication: Saint George

Architecture
- Style: Baroque

Site
- Location: Weltenburg, Kelheim, Germany
- Coordinates: 48°53′56″N 11°49′11″E
- Public access: partial

Weltenburg Abbey (Kloster Weltenburg) is a Benedictine monastery in Weltenburg near Kelheim on the Danube in Bavaria, Germany.

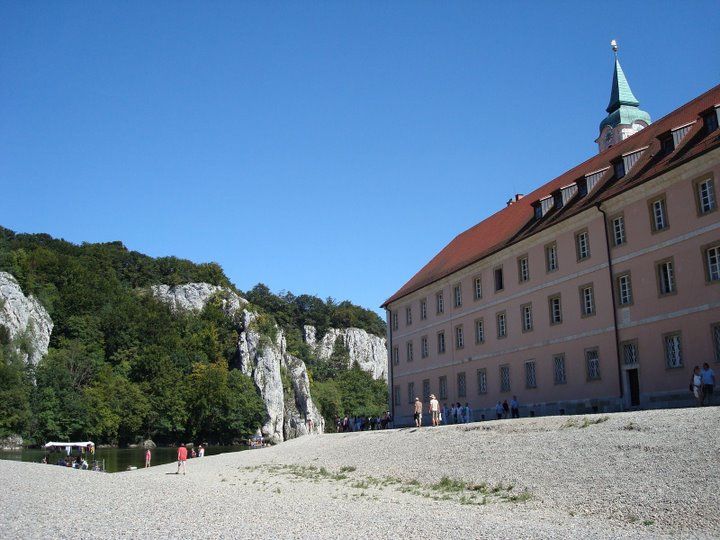
Weltenburg Abbey seen from the river

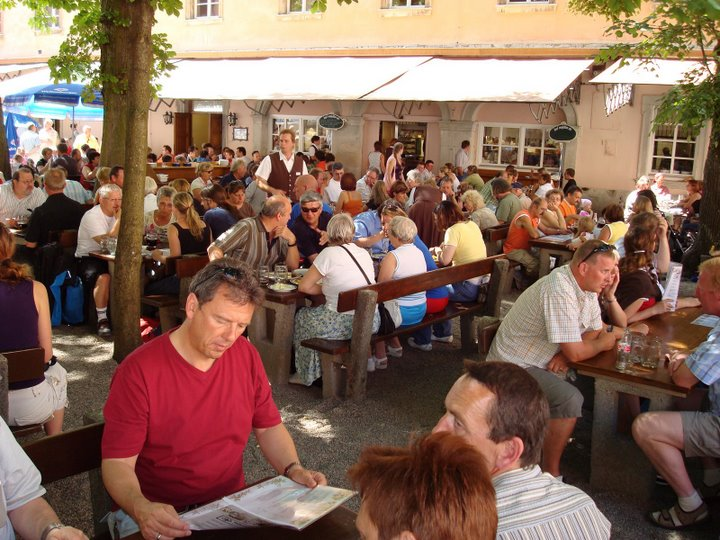
Weltenburg Abbey, beer garden

== Geography ==
The abbey is situated on a peninsula in the Danube, in a section of the river valley called the Weltenburg Narrows (otherwise known as the Danube Gorge).

== History ==
By around 45 AD the Weltenburg area was the starting point of the Via iuxta Danuvium – the Roman military and border road which followed the south bank of the Danube upstream to Brigobannis, the limes fort near Hüfingen. For a long time this road was the most important east–west route north of the Alps. At Mertingen (Sumuntorium) this route met the Via Claudia Augusta from northern Italy. There was already a settlement above the monastery on the Frauenberg in prehistoric times. Archaeological finds and excavations suggest that a Roman military station was constructed there.

=== First foundation ===
According to tradition, the abbey was founded in about 617 in the course of the Hiberno-Scottish mission by Agilus and Eustace of Luxeuil, two monks of Luxeuil Abbey, which had been founded by Saint Columbanus. It is believed to be the oldest monastery in Bavaria.

Reportedly during the first half of the 8th century, the abbey adopted the rules of the Benedictine order and was supported by Tassilo III, Duke of Bavaria.

By 932 at the latest, the abbey was under control of the Bishop of Regensburg. Wolfgang of Regensburg had a residence built on the Frauenberg above today's abbey. The abbey church (replaced in 1716) was consecrated in 1191, a single nave building with a crypt. Under abbot Konrad V (1441–50), the church, abbey buildings were renovated and life in the abbey reformed.

It was not until the 18th century that Weltenburg Abbey rose to prominence under abbot Maurus Bächl (1713–43). The current monastery courtyard with its Baroque buildings date to his period. The abbey church, dedicated to Saint George, was built by the Asam Brothers between 1716 and 1739.

Following the confiscation of the abbey's silver church treasure and a ban on accepting novices, the abbey was officially dissolved on 18 March 1803 as part of the secularization of Bavaria during the process of German mediatisation. The abbey brewery and other manufacturing buildings found buyers, but the church and convent could not be sold. In 1812, they became the parish house, school, teacher house and parish church of the village of Weltenburg.

=== Second foundation ===
On the initiative of King Ludwig I, Weltenburg was re-founded as a priory of Metten Abbey on 25 August 1842. It renovated the convent and repurchased other properties, including the brewery. It has been a member of the Bavarian Congregation of the Benedictine Confederation since 1858 and was raised to the status of an independent abbey in 1913.

The chapel underwent extensive restoration from 1999 to 2008 at a cost of around 6.5 million euro. In addition, the convent was renovated and the abbey fitted with flood protection.

== Today ==
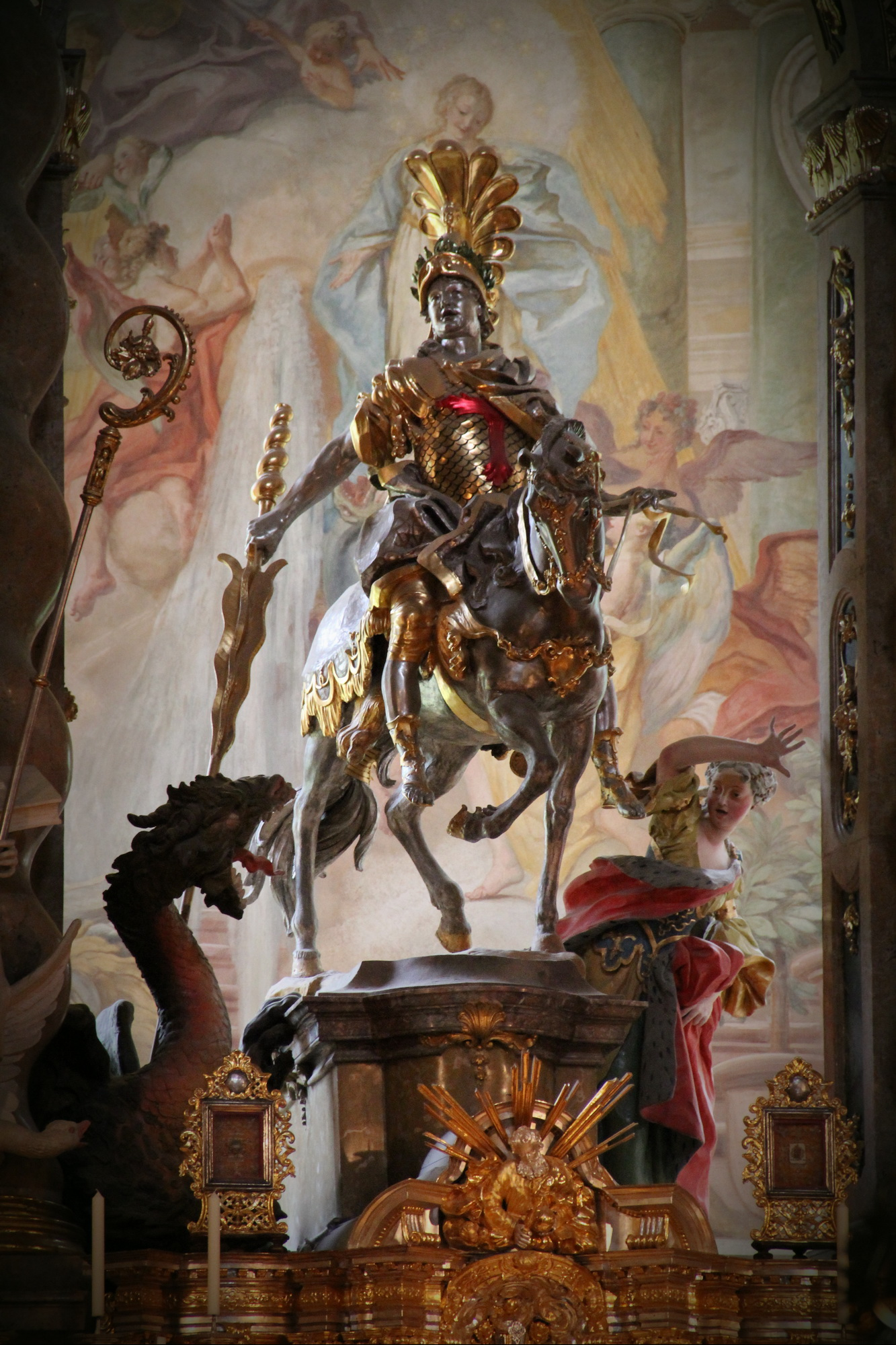
Main altar showing St. George

=== Abbey ===
In addition to its traditional duties of hospitality the abbey has pastoral responsibility for two parishes. It is also active in farming and in adult education, and hosts conferences and lectures as well as concerts. The campus is open to the public except for the section reserved for the monks themselves.

=== Abbey brewery ===
Weltenburg Abbey brewery (Weltenburger Klosterbrauerei) is by some reckonings the oldest monastic brewery in the world, having been in operation since 1050, although the title is disputed by Weihenstephan Abbey. Weltenburger Kloster Barock Dunkel was given the World Beer Cup award in 2004, 2008 and 2012 as the best Dunkel beer in the world. One wing of the abbey which faces the Danube river houses a large restaurant on the ground floor operated by a tenant. The traditional Bavarian menu includes the abbey's cheese and beer, and guests are also served in the monastery courtyard, which houses a large open-air biergarten during the warmer months.

== See also ==
- 18th-century Western domes
