= Callinica and Basilissa =

Two Christian martyrs

Saints Callinica and Basilissa (died 252) were two Christian martyrs. They were "wealthy matrons" who helped imprisoned Christians by providing them with food, money, and other necessities. They were "arrested for their generosity" and beheaded by the sword in Rome in 252, probably during the persecution conducted by Roman emperor Decius. Basilissa was described as "a rich lady of Galatia in Asia Minor, was distinguished for her charitable zeal". Callinica was her helper in her good works. Callinica was arrested first; her testimony led to Basilissa's arrest. Hagiographer Agnes Dunbar said this about them: "Both avowing their belief in Christ, and steadfastly refusing to sacrifice to the idols, they were tortured and beheaded". Their feast day is March 22.

Dunbar also states that some sources refer to Callinica as a man ("Callinicus"), and that other sources say that the two lived during the reign of the Roman emperor Trajan 100–150 years earlier. They also say that the women were part of the five companions of Trajan's daughter Drozella (also known as Drosis). Another source, also according to Dunbar, states that Callinica and Basilissa were companions of Saint Birillus of Antioch, who was the first bishop of Cantania in Sicily, appointed by Saint Peter.
