= Rebais =

- Commune
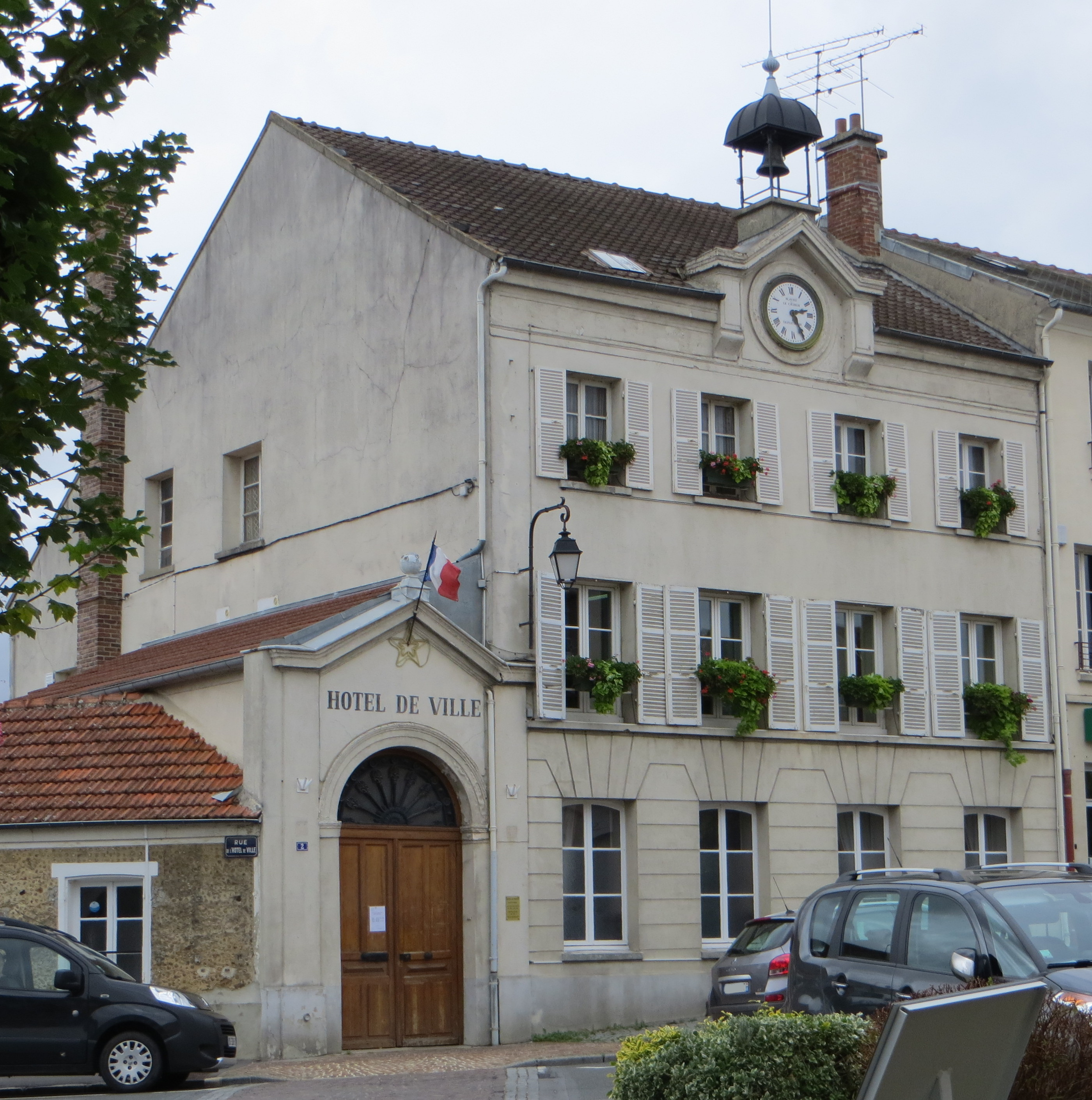
- The town hall in Rebais

- Coat of arms
- Location of Rebais
- Location within France Location within Île-de-France (region)
- Coordinates: 48°50′51″N 3°13′58″E
- Country: France
- Region: Île-de-France
- Department: Seine-et-Marne
- Arrondissement: Provins
- Canton: Coulommiers

Government
  - Mayor (2020–2026): Benoît Carré
- Area^{1}: 11.05 km^{2} (4.27 sq mi)
- Highest elevation: 187 m (614 ft)
- Lowest elevation: 119 m (390 ft)
- Population (2023): 2,294
  - Density: 207.6/km^{2} (537.7/sq mi)
- Time zone: UTC+01:00 (CET)
  - Summer (DST): UTC+02:00 (CEST)
- INSEE/Postal code: 77385 /77510
- ^{1} French Land Register data, which excludes lakes, ponds, glaciers > 1 km^{2} (0.386 sq mi or 247 acres) and river estuaries.

Rebais (French pronunciation: [ʁəbɛ]) is a commune in the Seine-et-Marne department in the Île-de-France region in north-central France.

== Etymology ==
Rebais has historically been attested in Latin as Rebascis in 635/636 and Rebascum in 1214. The toponym Rebais is of Germanic origin, deriving from a High German dialect, ultimately from Proto-West-Germanic *hross. The Germanic hydronym *-bak(i) entered the French language via High German, and took on two forms: the Germanic form -bach and Romantic -bais.

== Population ==
Historical population
| Year | Pop. | ±% p.a. |
|---|---|---|
| 1968 | 1,324 | — |
| 1975 | 1,448 | +1.29% |
| 1982 | 1,707 | +2.38% |
| 1990 | 1,751 | +0.32% |
| 1999 | 2,020 | +1.60% |
| 2007 | 2,104 | +0.51% |
| 2012 | 2,174 | +0.66% |
| 2017 | 2,288 | +1.03% |
| 2023 | 2,294 | +0.04% |
Source: INSEE

The inhabitants are called Resbaciens in French.

== See also ==
- Communes of the Seine-et-Marne department
