= Vasilisa (name) =

Russian female given name

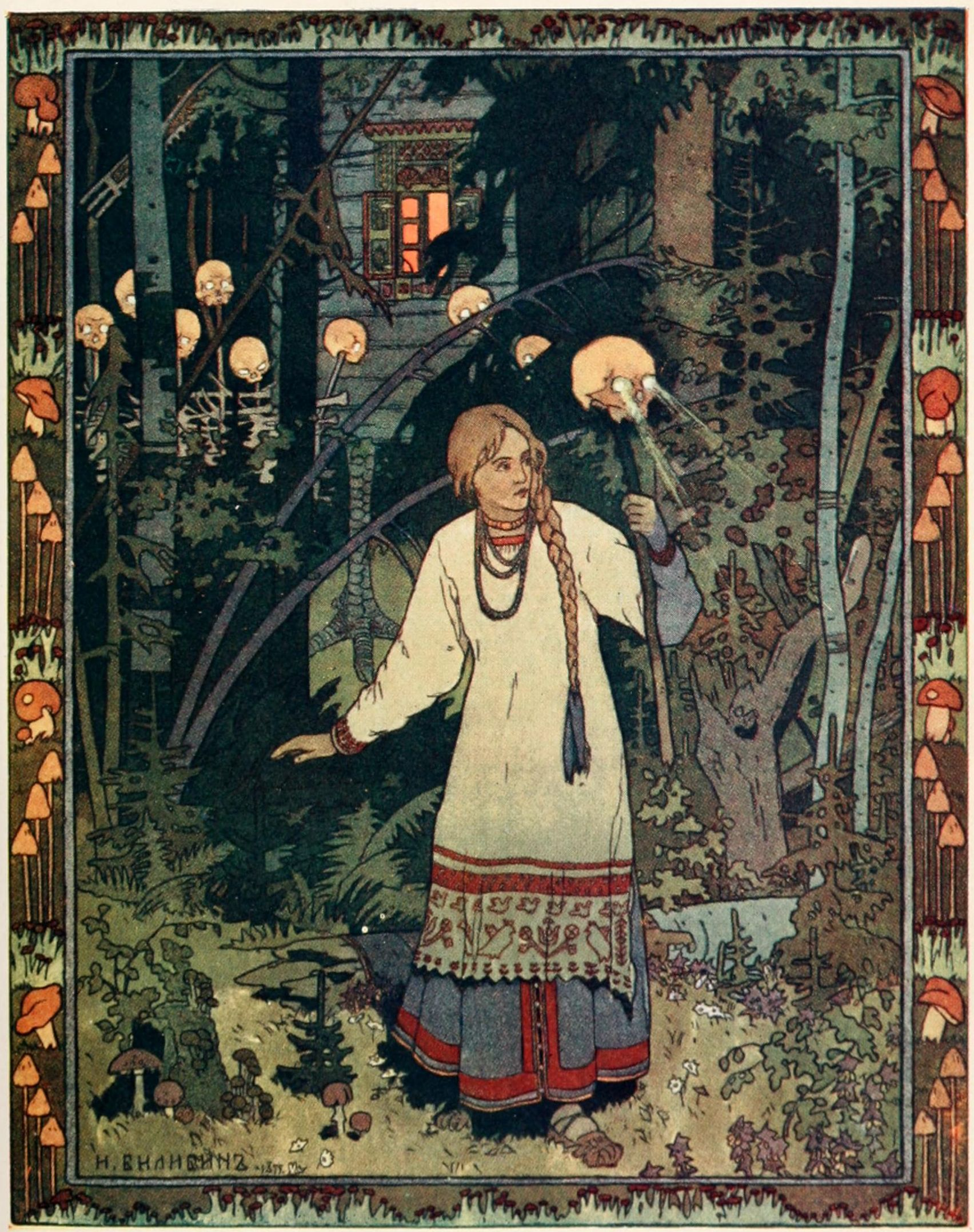
- Princess Vasilisa the Wise or Vasilisa the Beautiful is a stock Russian fairy tale character. Here she is seen at the hut of Baba Yaga in Vasilisa the Beautiful.
- Pronunciation: IPA: [vəsʲɪˈlʲisə]
- Gender: female

Origin
- Origin: Greek, Russian
- Meaning: queenly, Russian feminine form of Vasily or Basil.
- Region of origin: Russia

Other names
- Nickname: Vasya
- Related names: Basilia, Basilissa, Basilla, Vassa, Vasilia, Vasiliki (Greek); Vasilka (Bulgarian); Vasylyna (Ukrainian); Vasilissa

The Russian female name Vasilisa (Russian: Василиса) is of Greek origin (Greek: βασίλισσα, basilissa), which means "queen" or "empress". It is the feminine form of Vasily, the Russian form of the name Basil. The Ukrainian version of this name is Vasylyna (ʋɐsɪˈlɪnɐ), while the Belarusian form is Vasilina (va.sʲiˈlʲi.na).

Its use was inspired by several other early saints who are venerated by the Roman Catholic and Eastern Orthodox churches. It was the name of several early princesses. Vasilisa the Wise and Vasilisa the Beautiful are stock Russian fairy tale characters.

== People with the name ==
- Vasilisa Bardina (b. 1987), Russian tennis player
- Vasilisa Berzhanskaya, Russian operatic mezzo-soprano
- Vasilisa Davankova, Russian ice dancer
- Vasilisa Davydova, Russian tennis player
- Vasilisa Forbes, Russian film director
- Vasilisa Kaganovskaia (born 2005), Russian ice dancer
- Vasilisa Kozhina, Russian guerilla fighter
- Vasilisa Kuzmina (born 1991), Russian actress
- Vasilisa Marzaliuk, Belarusian wrestler
- Vasilisa Melentyeva
- Vasilisa Semenchuk, Russian freestyle skier
- Vasilisa Stepanova (born 1993), Russian rower
- Vasilisa Volodina, Russian television host
- Vasilisa Volokhova, Russian noblewoman

== Fictional characters ==
Today the name is also associated with a fairy-tale princess because of its frequent use in Russian fairy tales. The princess Vasilisa the Beautiful or Vasilisa the Wise is a stock character in Russian fairy tales, including "The Frog Tsarevna" and "Vasilisa the Beautiful". The character often rises in status from a peasant girl to the wife of a prince; or she is a princess who marries the hero after helping him to accomplish difficult tasks. Unlike other fairy-tale heroines who wait to be rescued, Vasilisa often accomplishes a series of tasks that help her defeat the villain of the story. In the tales, the character is also usually a successful housekeeper, which helps her win the love of the prince.

Fictional characters with this name include:

- Vasilisa Dragomir, a character in the book series Vampire Academy by Richelle Mead
- Vasilisa Petrovna, the protagonist of the Winternight trilogy by Katherine Arden

== Similar names ==
- Basilissa (name)
