= Vasilissa (child martyr) =

4th-century Christian martyr and saint

Saint Vasilissa of Nicomedia Василисса Никомидийская
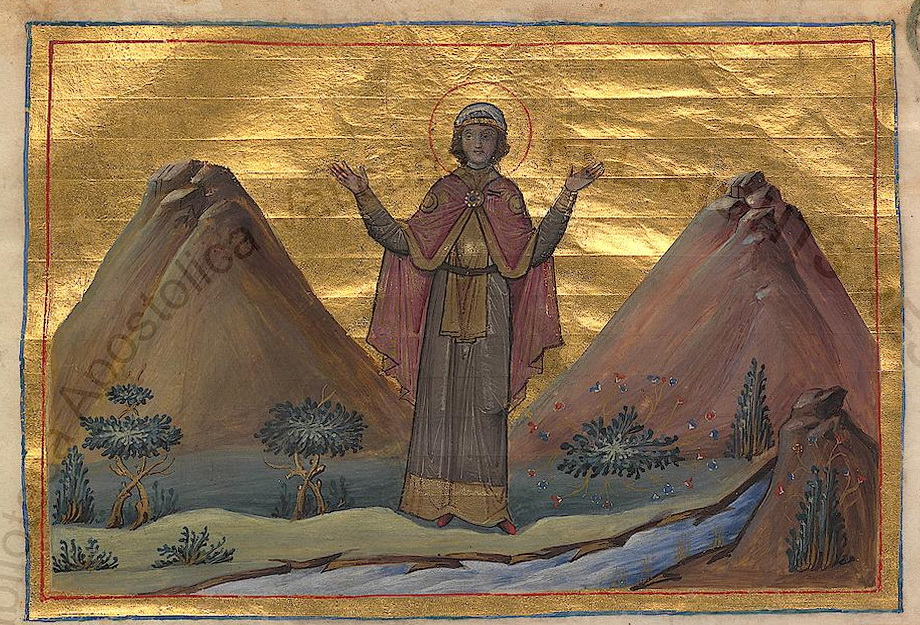

Child Martyr
- Born: 300
- Died: 309; Nicomedia
- Venerated in: Eastern Orthodox Church; Roman Catholic Church
- Feast: 16 September

Vasilissa (300–309) was a Roman Christian girl who is venerated as a child martyr by the Russian Orthodox Church. According to tradition, she was a small child when martyred, suffering in Nicomedia not long after the death of St. Anthimus. The torturers covered her whole body with wounds, but she remained faithful to Jesus Christ.

== Life ==
Vasilissa was born in or c. 300 AD in the Roman Empire. She is thought to have survived the Nicomedia massacre as a four-year-old girl. According to Holy Tradition, she was tortured with fire and wild beasts, yet remained unharmed. Her torturer, Alexander, seeing these wonders, repented and became a Christian. Vasilissa is said to have gone into a field, and fallen to her knees in prayer, thanking God for her endurance under torture, and whilst praying, she was martyred. She died in 309.
