= Anthimus of Nicomedia =

Saint Anthimus of Nicomedia
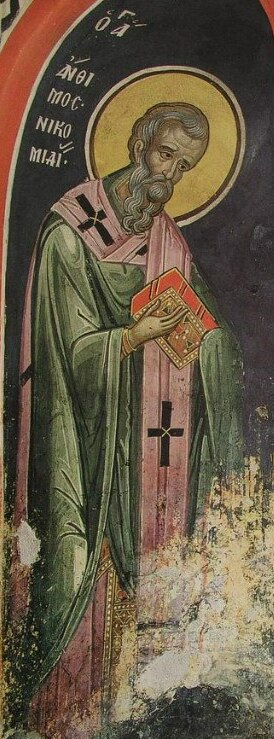

Bishop of Nicomedia and Hieromartyr
- Died: ~303 or 311-12 AD; Nicomedia (modern-day İzmit, Turkey)
- Venerated in: Eastern Orthodox Church; Catholic Church; Oriental Orthodox Church
- Canonized: Pre-congregation
- Feast: 3 September (Eastern Orthodox); 24 April (Roman Catholic)
- Attributes: 20,000 Martyrs of Nicomedia

Anthimus of Nicomedia (Greek: Ἄνθιμος Νικομηδείας; martyred 303 or 311–12), was the bishop of Nicomedia in Bithynia, where he was beheaded during a persecution of Christians, traditionally placed under Diocletian (following Eusebius), in which "rivers of blood" flowed.

== History ==
Nicomedia was Diocletian's chief place of residence and was half-Christian, the palace itself being filled with Christians. Christian sources memorialized the "20,000 Martyrs of Nicomedia". The main Christian church of Nicomedia was destroyed on 23 February 303; the First Edict was published on the following day. Shortly after the promulgation of the edict, a fire broke out in the imperial palace; the Christians were blamed. The massacres transpired in the Christian communities of Bithynia after altars were set up in the marketplaces, in which no transactions were permitted until a token sacrifice to the gods and the daemon of the Augustus had been performed.

At the request of members of his congregation, Anthimus took refuge in the small village of Omana, where he provided aid to survivors and sent letters exhorting the Christians to stand firm. When the soldiers of Maximinus were sent to find him, he welcomed them and fed them before revealing who he was. (The detail referring to Maximinus suggests that two persecutions have been conflated.) Amazed at his kindness, the soldiers promised him to tell Maximinus that they had not found him, but Anthimus returned with them, and converted and baptized them along the way.

Philip Schaff and Henry Wace note that a fragmentary letter preserved in the Chronicon Paschale, as written in prison by the presbyter Lucian of Antioch awaiting death, mentions Anthimus, bishop of Nicomedia, as having just suffered martyrdom. Schaff and Wace note that Lucian was imprisoned and put to death during the persecution of Maximinus Daia (in 311 or 312) and therefore conclude that, if the fragment is genuine, Anthimus suffered martyrdom not under Diocletian but under Maximinus.
