= Montier-en-Der Abbey =

Abbey in Haute-Marne, France

Coordinates: 48°28′41″N 4°46′20″E

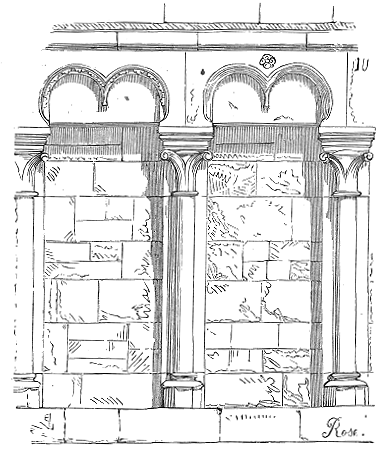
Carolingian Blind arcading in the abbey church, from Viollet-le-Duc, 1856.

The Abbey of Montier-en-Der in Haute-Marne, France, was formerly a Benedictine, later Cluniac, abbey, dissolved during the French Revolution, the grounds and premises of which, since 1806, have been used as the French National Stud Farm.

== Monastery ==
The monastery was founded in about 670, in deep oak forest on the banks of the river Voire, at a place that at first still carried its Gallo-Roman name of Puteolus ("little well") in the diocese of Châlons-sur-Marne. The site, which must have been an aristocratic Gallo-Roman villa, to judge from the quality of the ivory diptych found at the site in modern times (illustration, below right), was at that time in the borderlands of Champagne just north of Burgundy and west of Lorraine. The founder was the monk Bercharius, later canonized; The extensive site, which was part of Bercharius' inheritance, was in the forest of Der; Puteolus, the monasterium in Dervo became Montier-en-Der, which name also came to be applied to the commune that grew up around this important abbey.

The eighth century was a time of eclipse for this monastic community, and when the monastery reemerges in the ninth it was Carolingian property, given by Louis the Pious to the bishop of Reims, and the house was served by canons rather than monks. A monastic refounding was effected by abbot Hauto (827).

In the early tenth century, the monks were forced to flee Viking attacks. They were re-established by the 930s, when Montier-en-Der accepted the Gorze Reform driven by St. Evre's Abbey, Toul; some years after, Montier-en-Der accepted the Cluniac Reforms.

By the end of the century, the primitive buildings had been replaced; the abbot Adso (960-92) set about rebuilding the ruined church in stone; it was reconsecrated in 998. The severe Carolingian—Romanesque nave contrasts with a Gothic choir illuminated by sixteenth-century stained glass windows. The abbey church retains its sixteenth-century wooden roof, reminding the visitor that not all churches were provided with stone vaulting. The Early Gothic choir is of the twelfth and thirteenth centuries.

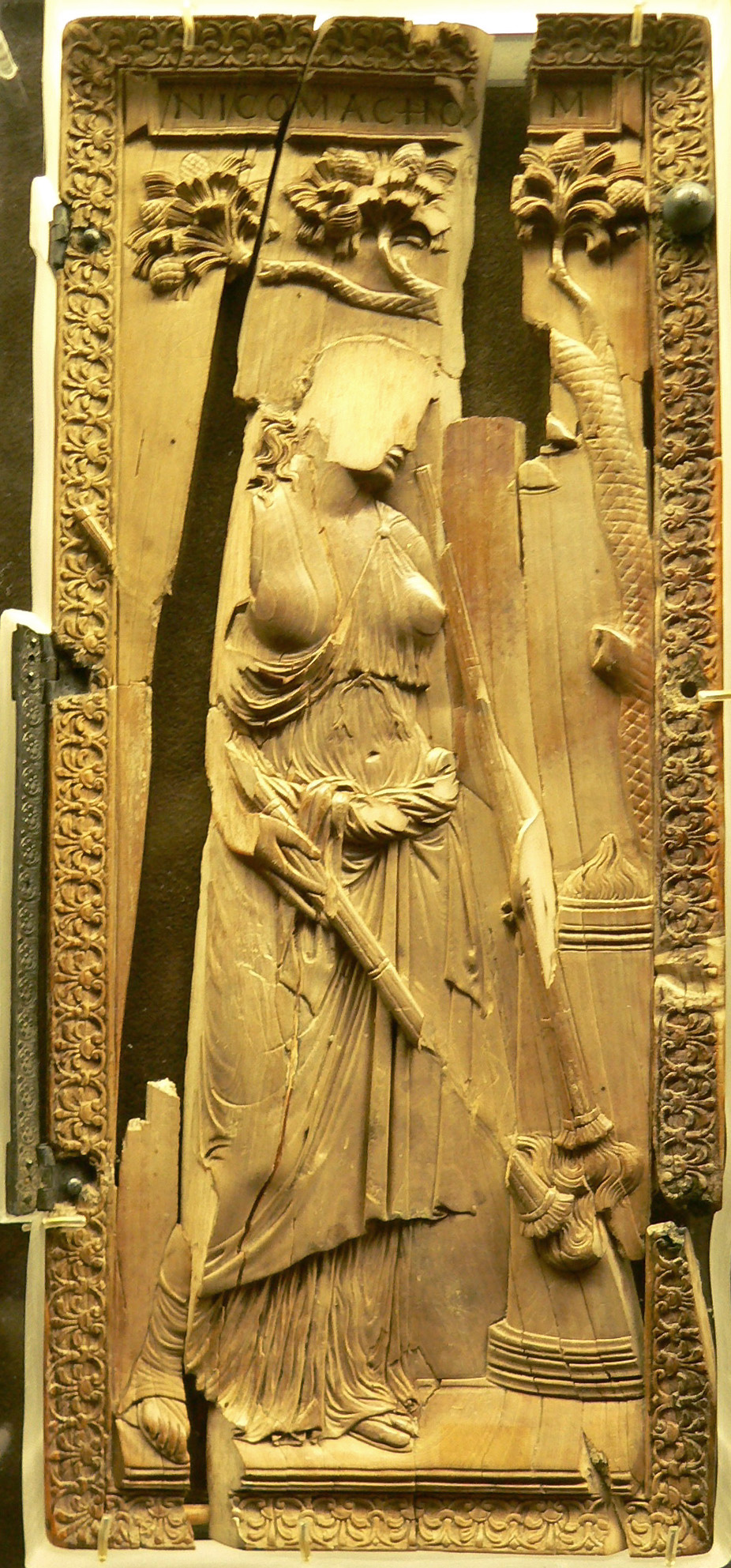
Ivory diptych still in fully classical style, commemorating a wedding linking the Symmachi and Nicomachi ca 400; it was found defaced and thrown in a well (puteolus) at Montier-en-Der. (Musée de Cluny)

The cartulary of Montier-en-Der, assembled in the 1120s at the height of the monastery's prestige and wealth, is a crucial source of information for the history of west Francia; among the genuine charters are a number of forgeries that are equally interesting for the claims that they were intended to support. The charters bear information on popes, kings, and counts, on manorial structures and the obligations of peasant tenants, and on monastic reform.

At the time of the Wars of Religion, Montier-en-Der supervised twelve priories, and the abbey was one of the core benefices in the strategy of Charles, Cardinal of Lorraine, who exercised seigneurial powers over twenty-one villages in the surrounding countryside.

== National Stud Farm ==
The abbey was secularized at the French Revolution (1790); in 1806 Napoleon established the National Stud Farm (Le Haras National) in the grounds of the former monastery, to breed improved horses for the use of the cavalry. The stud farm structures were rebuilt for more modern functionality during the Second Empire.

== See also ==
- Map of the Alods of St Bercharius, the testament of Bercharius that founded the monastery (in Latin).
- List of Carolingian monasteries
- Carolingian architecture
