= Dom Pérignon (monk) =

French Benedictine monk (1638–1715)

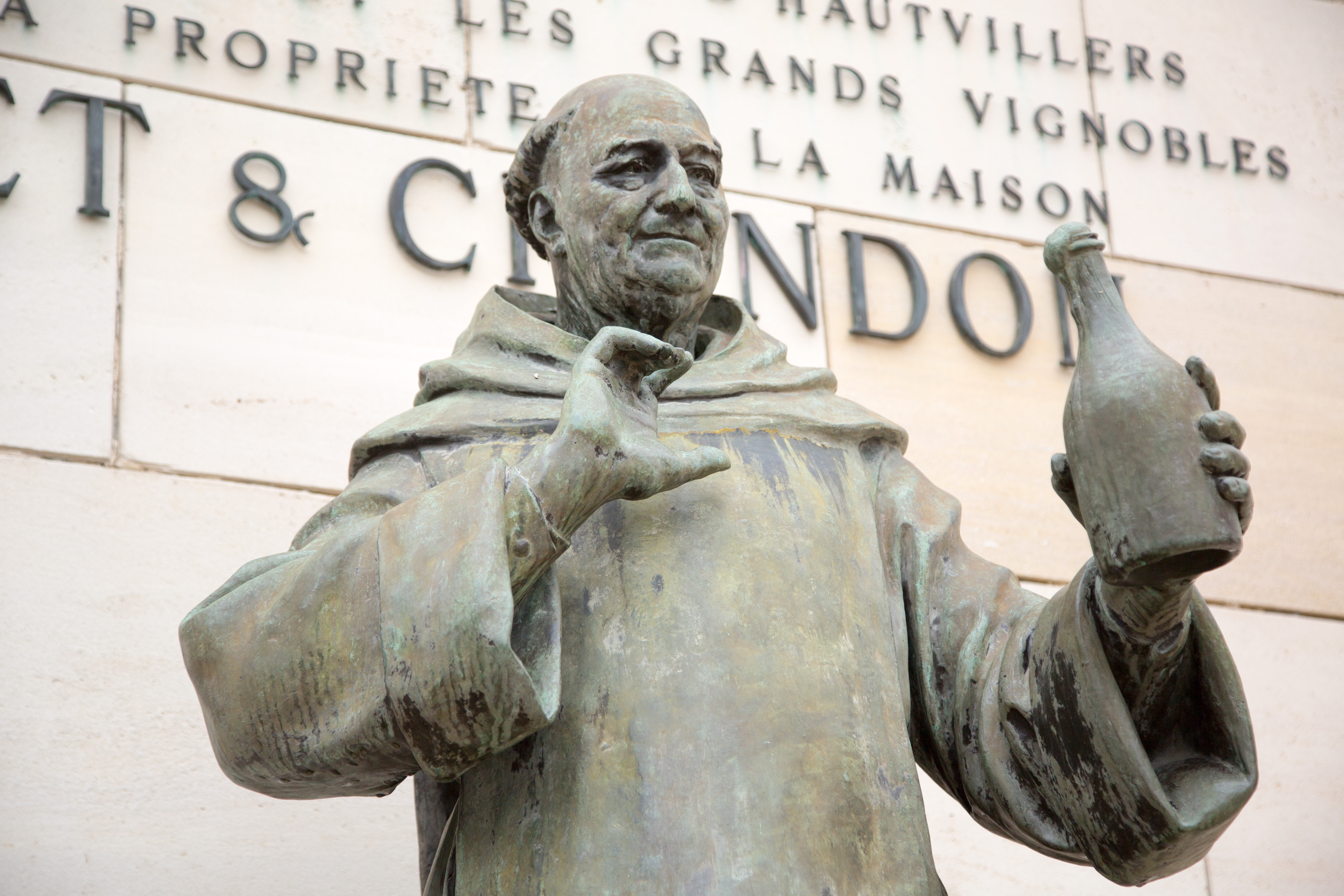
Statue of Dom Pérignon at Moët & Chandon

Dom Pierre Pérignon (French: [dɔ̃ pjɛʁ peʁiɲɔ̃]; December 1638 – 14 September 1715), was a French Benedictine monk who made important contributions to the production and quality of champagne wine in an era when the region's wines were predominantly still red. Popular tales frequently, but erroneously, credit him with the invention of sparkling champagne, which did not become the dominant style of champagne until the mid-19th century.

The famous champagne Dom Pérignon, the prestige cuvée of winery Moët & Chandon, is named after him. The remains of the monastery where he spent his adult life are now the property of that winery.

== Biography ==
Pérignon was born to a clerk of the local marshal in the town of Sainte-Menehould in the ancient Province of Champagne in the Kingdom of France. He was born in December 1638 and was baptized on 5 January 1639. He was the youngest of his parents' seven children, as his mother died the following summer. His father's family owned several vineyards in the region.

As a child Pérignon became a member of the boys' choir school operated by the Benedictine Abbey of Moiremont, studying there until 1651, when he went to study at the Jesuit college in Châlons-sur-Marne. When he was 17 he entered the Benedictine Order near the town of Verdun at the Abbey of Saint-Vanne, the leading monastery of the Congregation of St. Vanne. The congregation was a reform movement of monastic life, and he followed a regimen of prayer, study and manual labor, as prescribed in the Rule of Saint Benedict. In 1668 he was transferred to the Abbaye Saint-Pierre d'Hautvillers, where he served as cellarer for the rest of his life. Under his stewardship, the abbey flourished and doubled the size of its vineyard holdings, while he worked to improve their product with the help of Dom Thierry Ruinart, a noted scholar of the abbey.

When Pérignon died in 1715, as a sign of honor and respect, he was buried in a section of the abbey cemetery traditionally reserved only for abbots. That cemetery is now the property of the local commune.

The most photographed statue of Dom Pérignon stands at the entrance to Moët & Chandon's headquarters in Épernay, though as of summer 2022, a significantly more artistic one was unveiled in Hautvillers. The latter bronze integrates a very large glass champagne bottle into the figure's lower portion as well as a motif at its base which represents the trunk of the grape vine. The two cellar keys hanging from his belt sash represents the coat of arms of the same village.

== Influence on champagne production ==
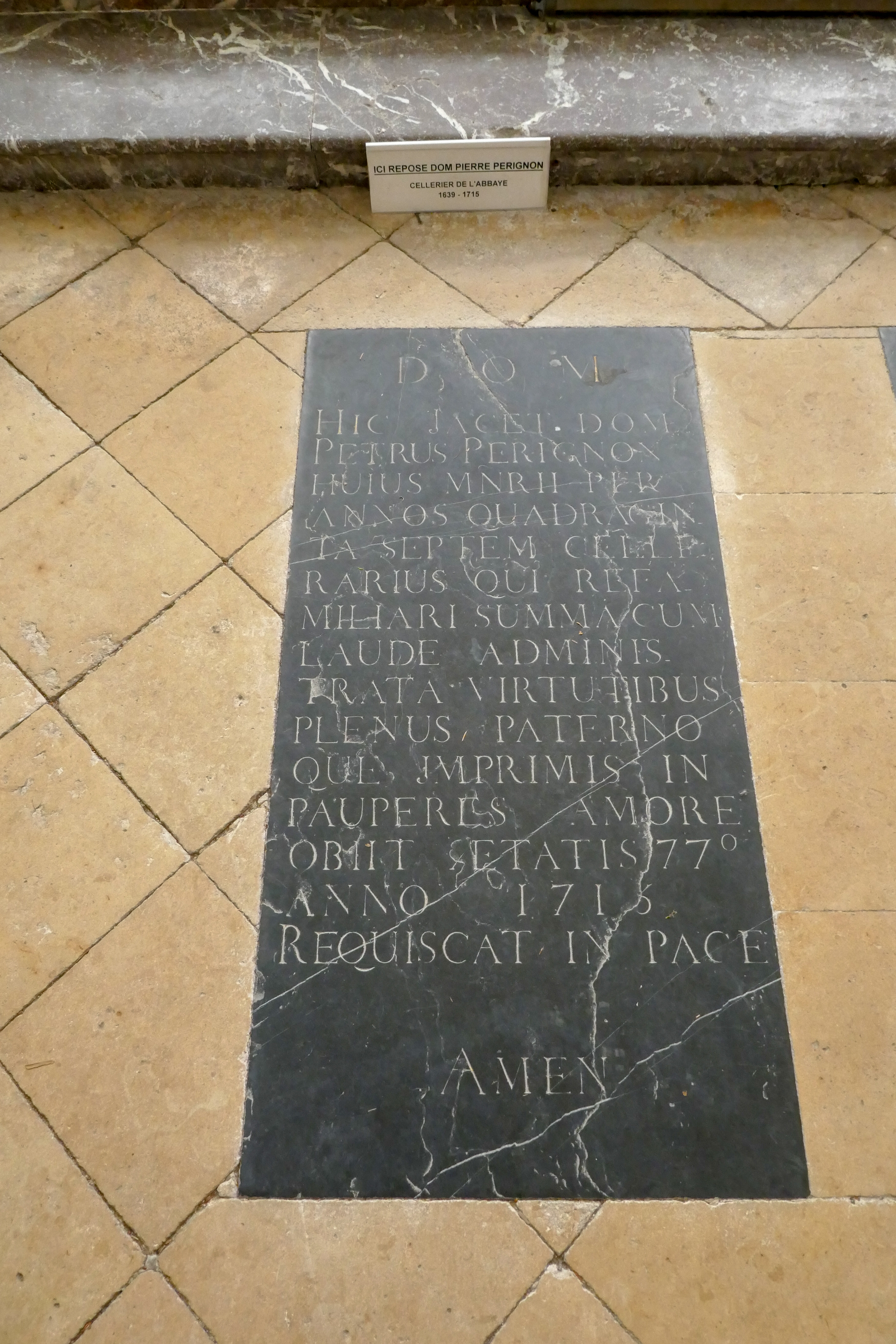
Dom Pérignon is buried in the church of Hautvillers, Champagne region.

In Pérignon's era, the in-bottle refermentation (now used to give sparkling wine its sparkle) was an enormous problem for winemakers. When the weather cooled off in the autumn, fermentation would sometimes stop before all the fermentable sugars had been converted to alcohol. If the wine was bottled in this state, it became a literal time bomb. When the weather warmed in the spring, dormant yeast roused themselves and began generating carbon dioxide that would at best push the cork out of the bottle, and at worst explode, starting a chain reaction. Nearby bottles, also under pressure, would break from the shock of the first breakage, and so on, which was a hazard to employees and to that year's production. Dom Pérignon thus tried to avoid refermentation. He did introduce some features that are hallmarks of Champagne today, particularly extensive blending of grapes from multiple vineyards.

In 1718, the Canon Godinot published a set of wine-making rules that were said to be established by Dom Pérignon. Among these rules was the detail that fine wine should only be made from Pinot noir. Pérignon was not fond of white grapes because of their tendency to enter re-fermentation. Other rules that Godinot included was Pérignon's guidance to aggressively prune vines so that they grow no higher than three feet and produce a smaller crop. Harvest should be done in cool, damp conditions (such as early morning) with every precaution being taken to ensure that the grapes don't bruise or break. Rotten and overly large grapes were to be thrown out. Pérignon did not allow grapes to be trodden and favored the use of multiple presses to help minimize maceration of the juice and the skins.

Pérignon was also an early advocate of wine-making using only natural processes, without the addition of foreign substances.

== Misconceptions ==
The quote attributed to Pérignon—"Come quickly, I am tasting the stars!"—is supposedly what he said when tasting the first sparkling champagne. However, the first appearance of that quote appears to have been in a print advertisement in the late 19th century.

The tales about Pérignon being the first to use corks and being able to name the precise vineyard by tasting a single grape likely originated from Dom Groussard's account of him.

Prior to blending he would taste the grapes without knowing the source vineyard to avoid influencing his perceptions. References to his "blind tasting of wine" have led to the common misconception that Dom Pérignon was blind.

Contrary to popular assumptions, Dom Pérignon did not introduce blending to Champagne wines but rather the method of blending the grapes prior to sending them to press.

== See also ==
- History of Champagne
- List of wine professionals

== Sources ==
- Johnson, Hugh (1989). Vintage: The Story of Wine. New York: Simon & Schuster. ISBN 0-671-68702-6. OCLC 19741999.
- Kladstrup, Don; Kladstrup, Petie (2005). Champagne: How the World's Most Glamorous Wine Triumphed Over War and Hard Times. New York: William Morrow. ISBN 0-06-073792-1. OCLC 60664456.
- Phillips, Roderick (2000). A Short History of Wine. New York: Ecco Press. ISBN 0-06-621282-0. OCLC 51267749.
