= Saint-Leu-Saint-Gilles de Paris =

Coordinates: 48.8629°N 2.3500°E

Église Saint-Leu-Saint-Gilles de Paris
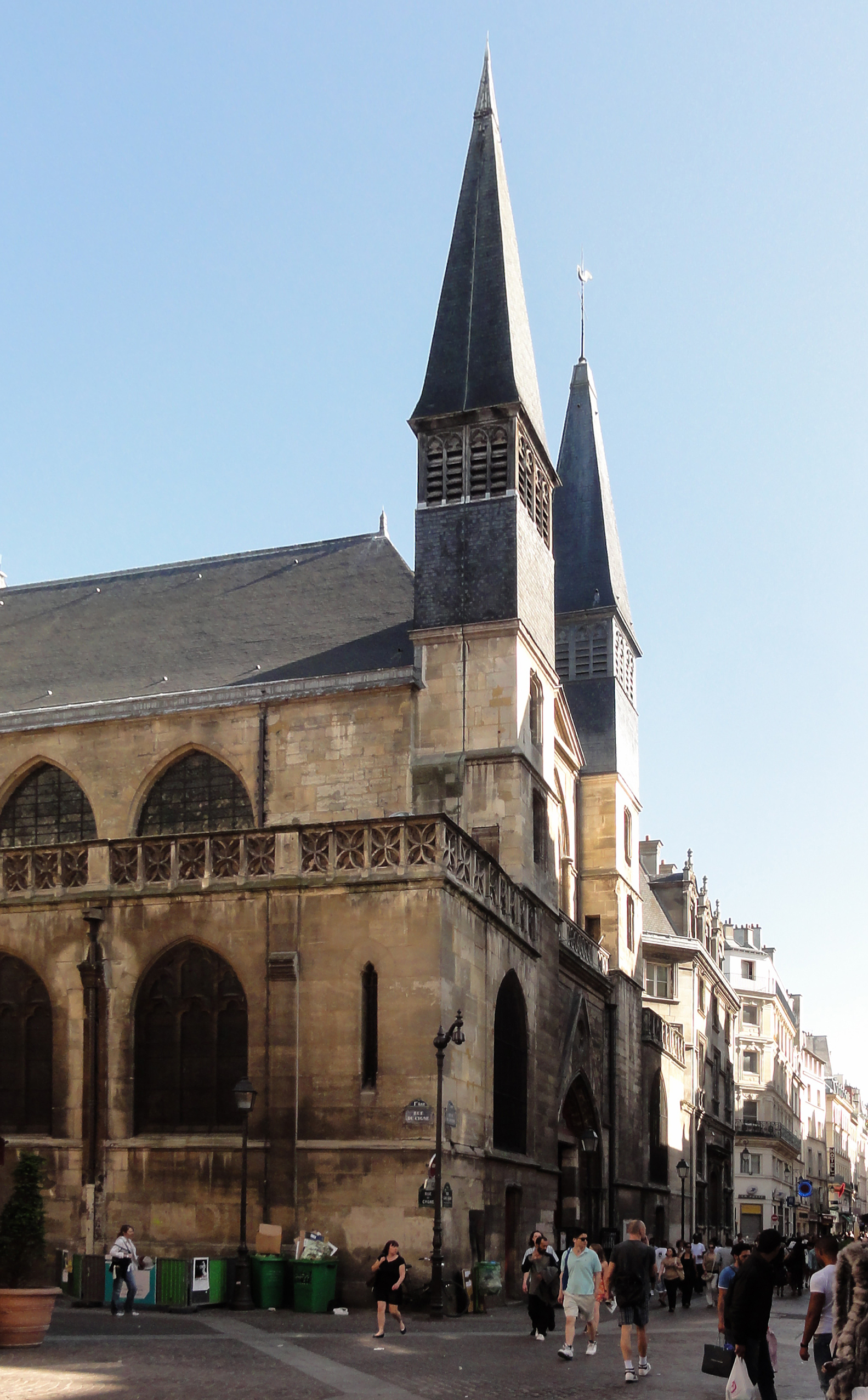
- Église Saint-Leu-Saint-Gilles de Paris
- Location: 1st arrondissement of Paris
- Country: France
- Denomination: Roman Catholic

Architecture
- Heritage designation: Monument historique (1915)
- Architectural type: church
- Style: Gothic
- Groundbreaking: 1235
- Completed: 1780

The Église Saint-Leu-Saint-Gilles de Paris is a Roman Catholic parish church in the 1st arrondissement of Paris. It has housed the relics of the Empress Saint Helena, mother of Constantine, since 1819, for which it remains a site of veneration in the Roman Catholic and Eastern Orthodox churches. In 1915 the French Ministry of Culture listed it as a monument of historical value.

== History ==
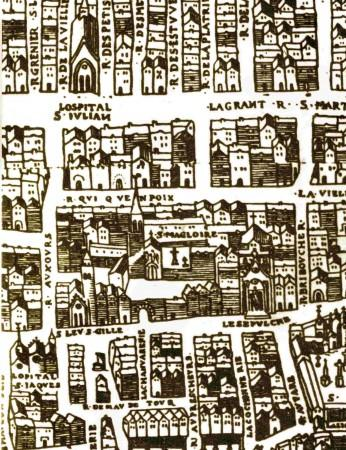
The church on the map by Olivier Truschet and Germain Hoyaux (1551-52)

In the 12th century, a small chapel dedicated to Saint Gilles, a hermit or monk in the Rhone Valley in the 6th century, occupied the site, within the Monastery of Saint-Maggiore, and close to the royal road that led from Paris to the Basilica of Saint-Denis. In 1235 construction began of a new church independent of the monastery, dedicated to Saint Gilles and later also to Saint Lupus of Troyes, or Saint Leu, who was credited at the time with saving Troyes from an attack by Atilla the Hun.

As the population of the neighborhood grew, the church was rebuilt in 1319, and underwent several major renovations and modifications, notably in 1611, 1727, and 1780, when an underground chapel was added. It was closed and badly damaged during the French Revolution, when it was turned into a storehouse for food. It was returned to the church in 1802 under Napoleon Bonaparte.

The Boulevard de Sébastopol was constructed behind the church by then-President and future Emperor Napoleon III, resulting in the demolition of three chapels and the apse. A renovation was carried out by architects Étienne-Hippolyte Godde and Victor Baltard. The church was closed and damaged again during the Paris Commune in 1871, but was restored.

=== The Knights of the Holy Sepulchre and the reliquary of Saint Helena ===
In 1780 the Knights of the Order of the Holy Sepulchre, a religious order which had originally been created in 1099 during the Crusades to protect early Christian sites in the Holy Land, established their headquarters in the church. They particularly venerated Saint Helena, the mother of the Emperor Constantine and an important figure in the early history of Christianity. In 1819 the relics of Saint Helena had been transferred to the church from the Abbaye Saint-Pierre d’Hautvillers by the Knights. In 1875, the reliquary of Saint Lupus of Sens was opened in order to carry out an anatomical analysis of the remains of Saint Helena. Based on the medical findings, Monsignor Richard, Archbishop of Paris, announced that the “reliquary contained the almost-complete torso of Saint Helena”, that “the head was missing and the limbs compressed”, and that “the state of the body conserved in the reliquary of the Église Saint-Leu-Saint-Gilles corresponded to the descriptions known to the Bollandistes in the 18th century”. The reliquary was subsequently placed on open display above and behind the high altar, at the feet of the large crucifix, suspended between two pillars of the apse.

The Knights of the Holy Sepulchre moved their headquarters from the church in 1830, but on 16 October 1928, Cardinal Dubois, Archbishop of Paris, held a ceremony in the church for the “Reintegration of the Knights of the Holy Sepulchre”. The building was subsequently made chapter house of that order. The order undertook a new mission to assist the Christian community in the Holy Land.

On 17 March 2000 the relics of Saint Helena were transferred to the crypt of the order's knights, making them more easily accessible for veneration. The first Eastern Orthodox liturgy was celebrated before the relics of Saint Helena on 22 February 2003.

The church is now managed by the Trinitarian Order. It pays particular attention to the homeless of its neighborhood, Les Halles.

== Exterior ==
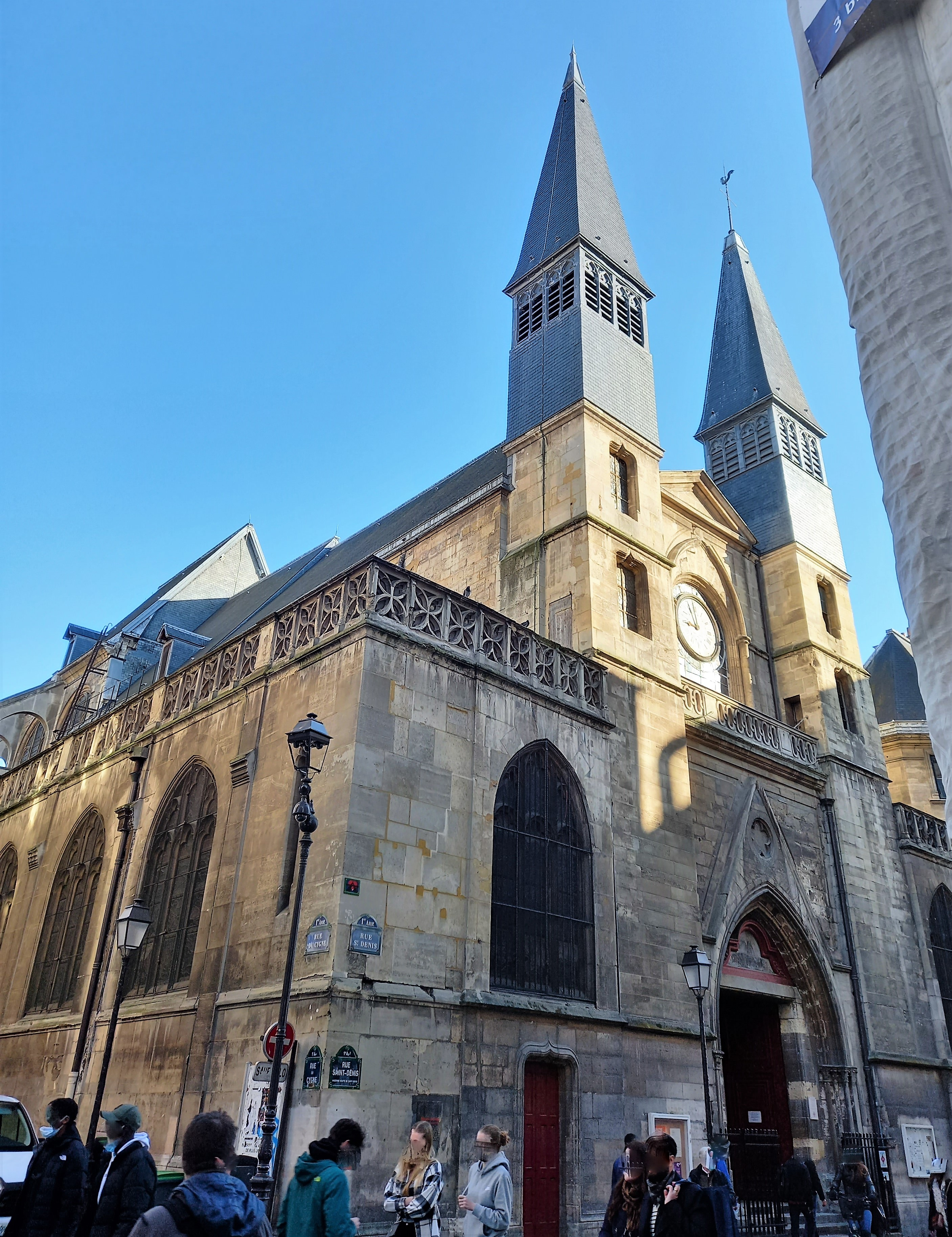
Towers, facade and portal

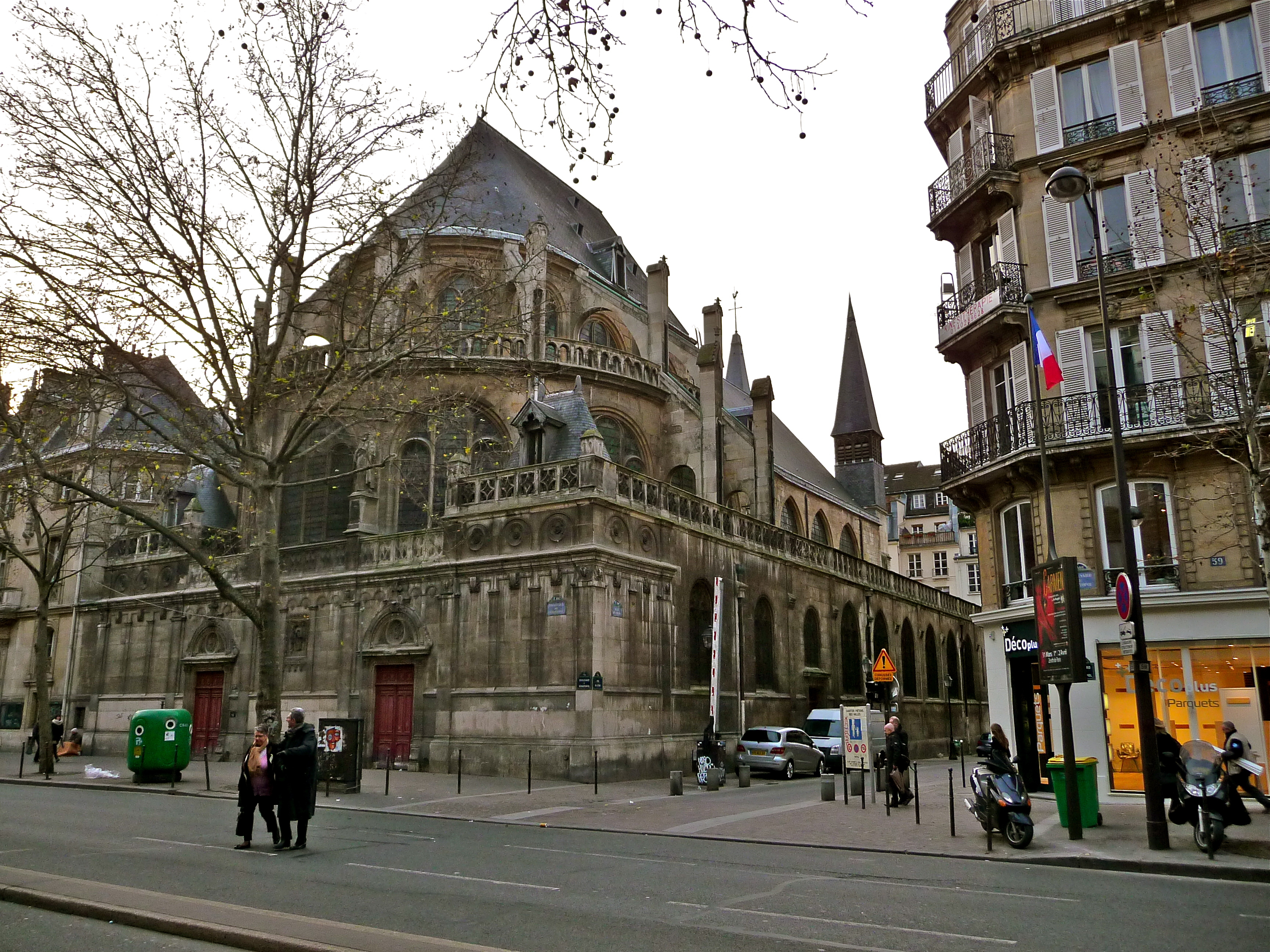
Apse of church viewed from Avenue Sevastopol

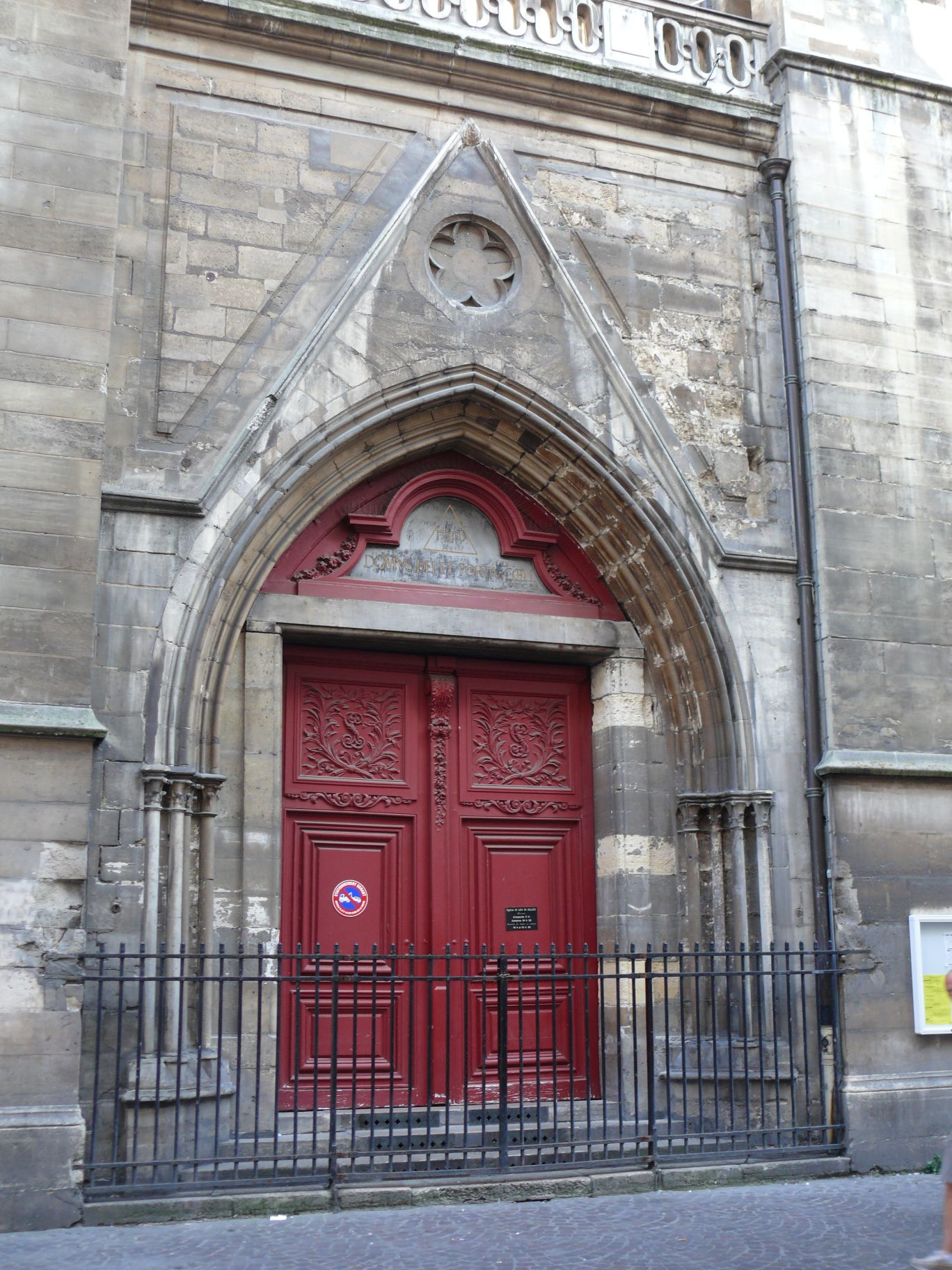
West Portal on Rue Saint-Denis

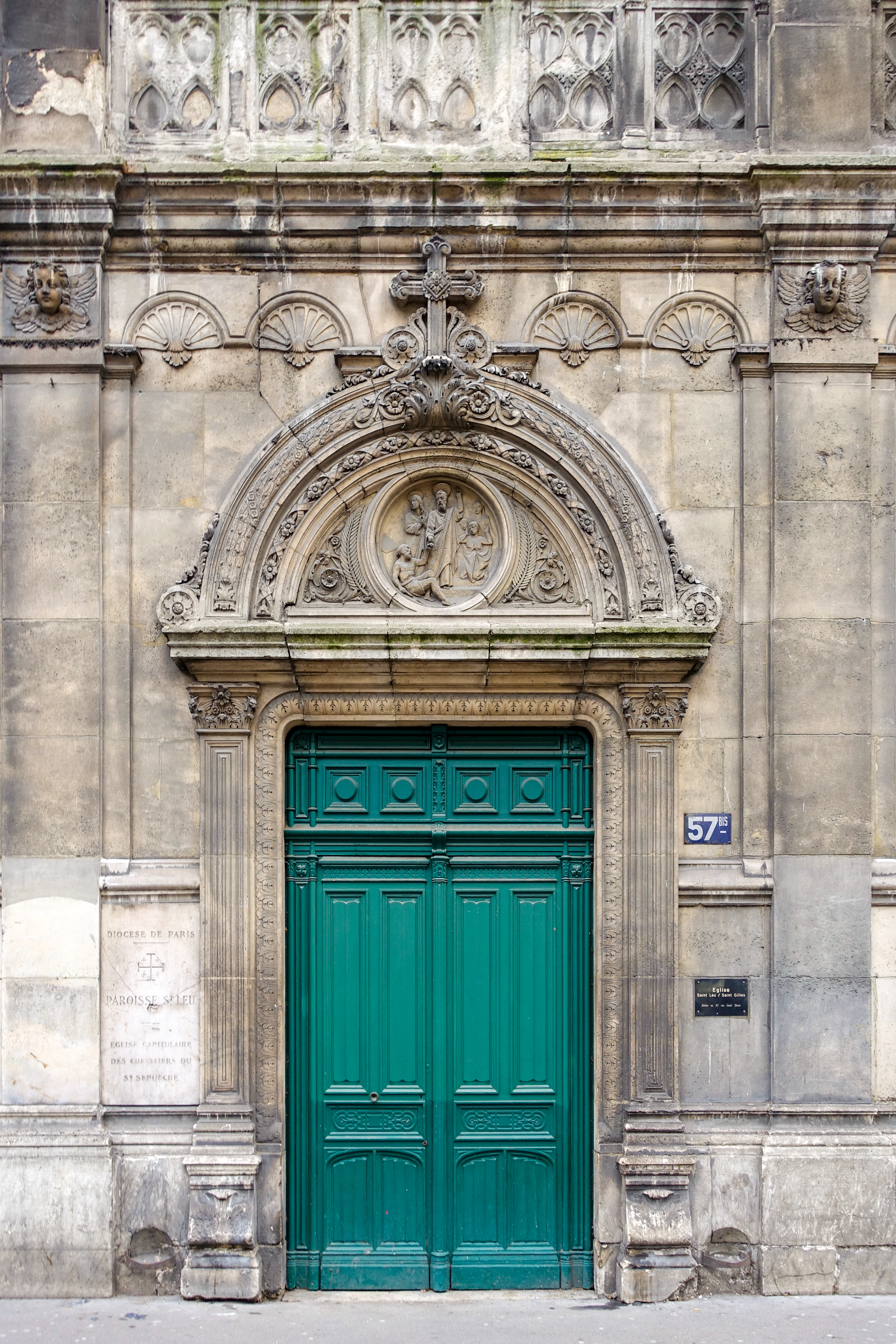
Portal with sculpture

The facade on Rue Saint-Denis is distinguished by two high towers, but the rest of the exterior is difficult to see because of the narrow streets. The outer aisles of the nave and choir were added later, and probably replaced earlier external buttresses. The apse of the church was considerably shortened in the 19th century and three chapels were removed to make space for the new boulevard built by Napoleon III.

== Interior ==
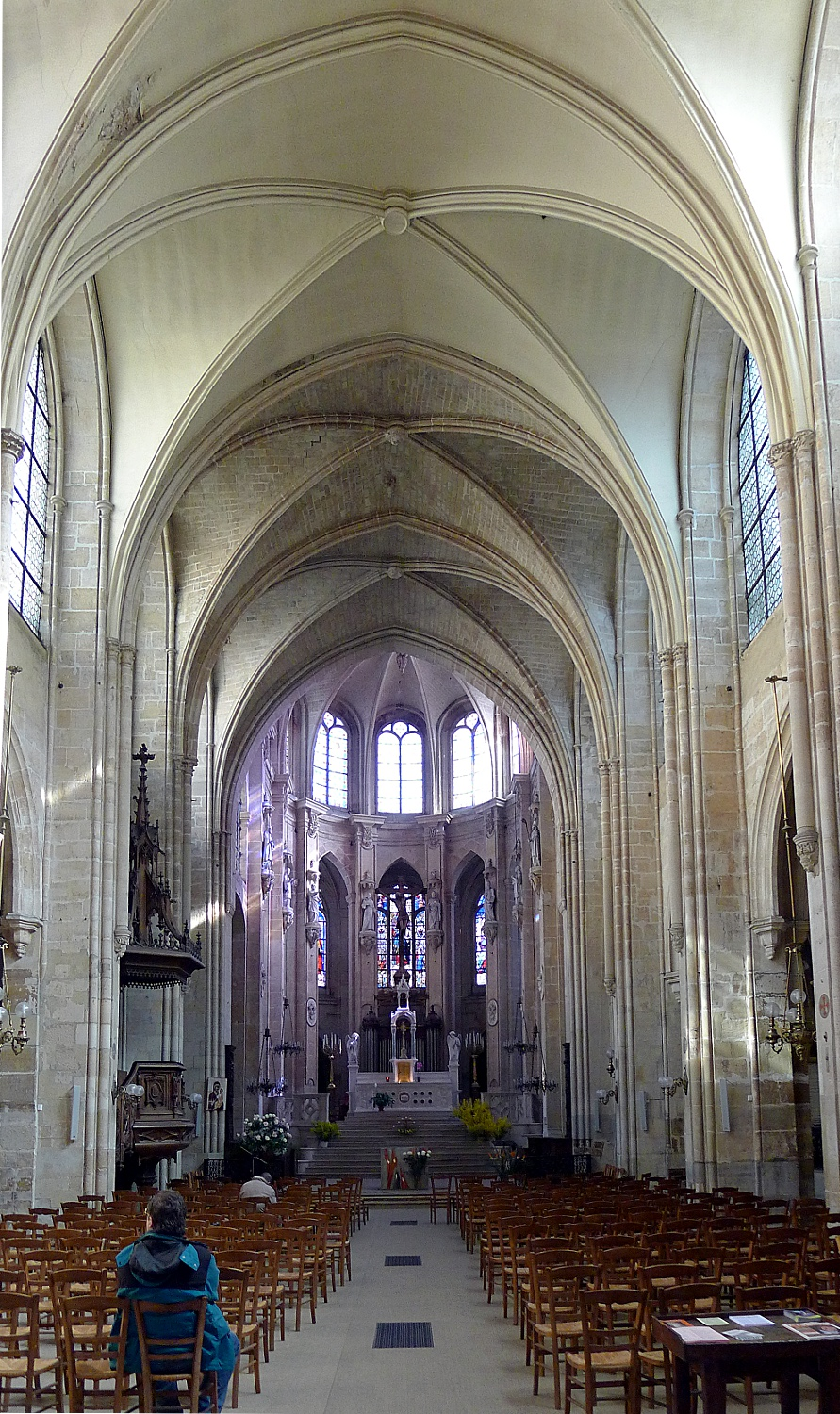
The nave looking toward the choir

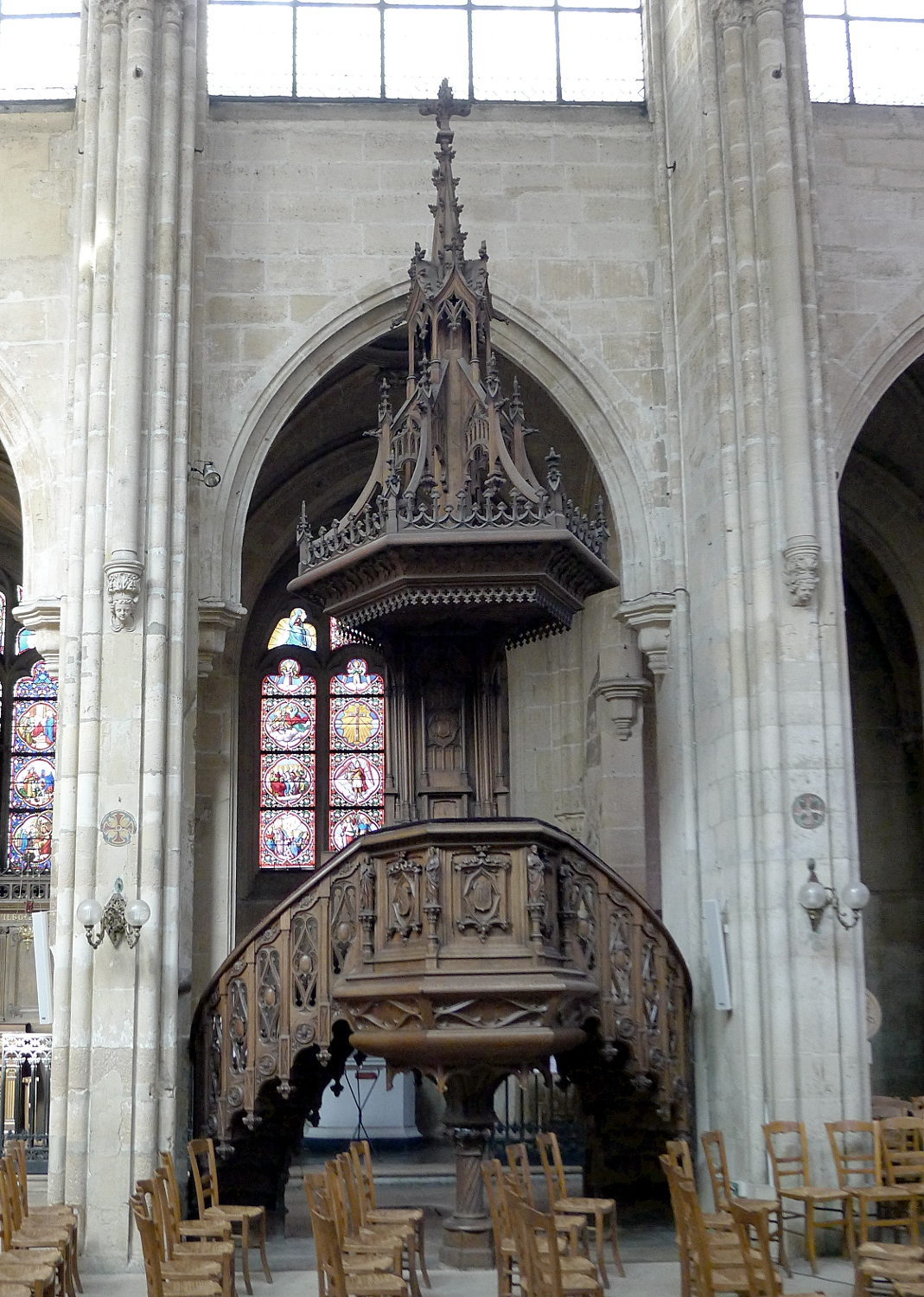
The pulpit in the Nave

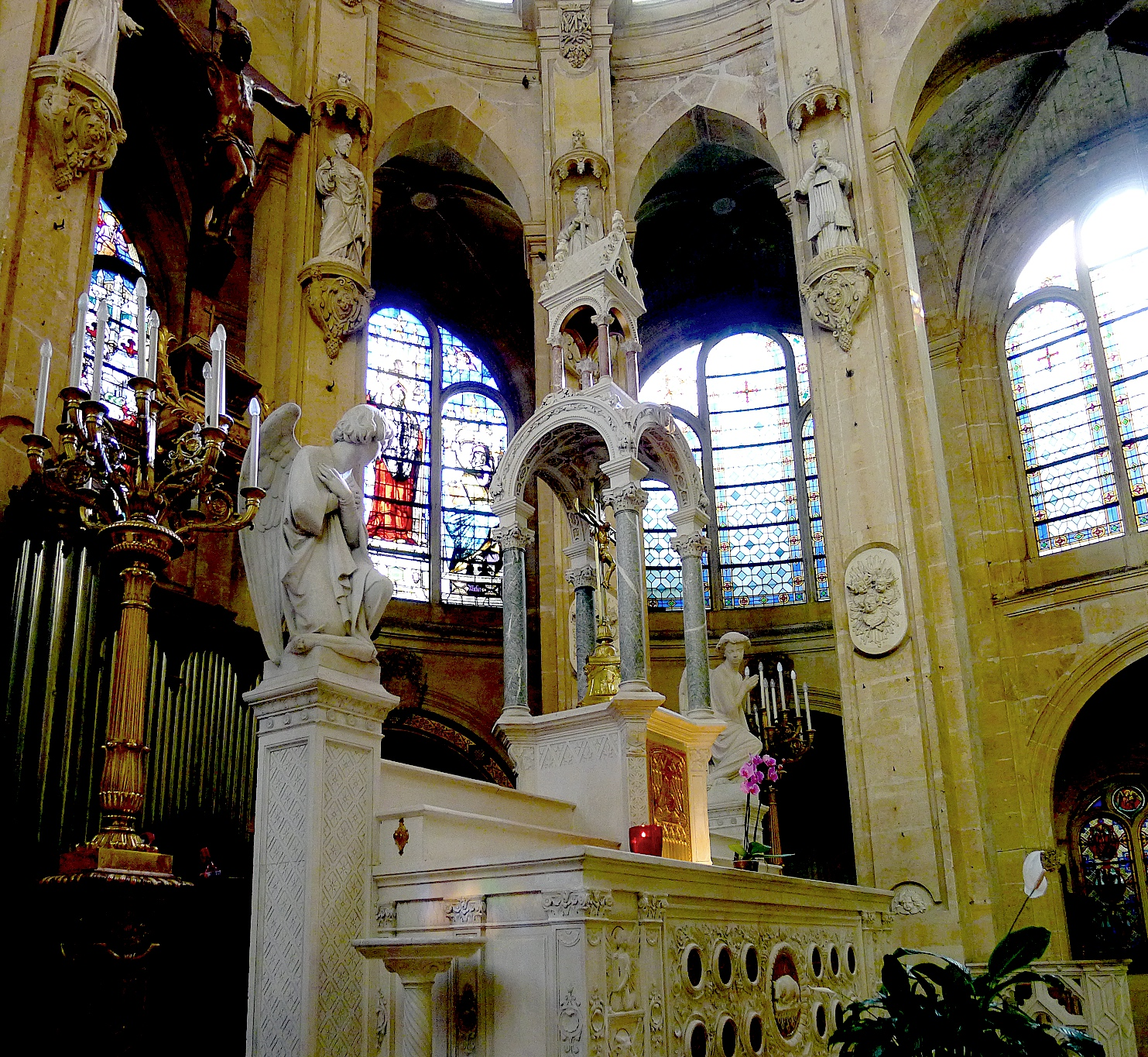
The choiir and altar

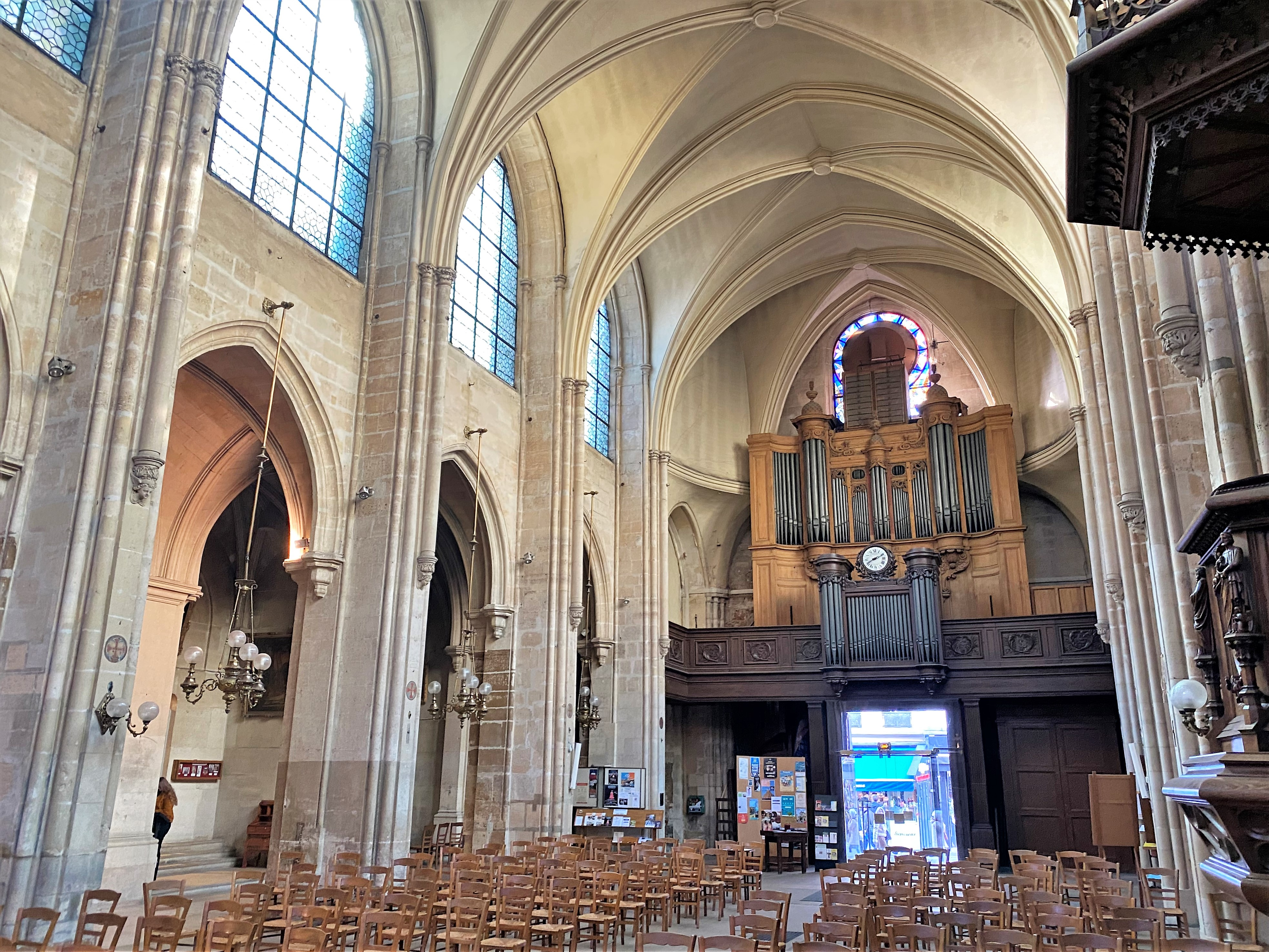
The nave and the great organ

The church is built in the Gothic style of the 14th century. This was a period of economic hardship, political conflict, and an outbreak of the black death, or plague in Paris. As a consequence the interior of the church was more austere than earlier or later Gothic churches in Paris.The church's single nave counts numerous stained-glass windows. It is flanked by aisles, but the church has no transept. pl The church did not originally have collateral aisles and chapels, which were added in the 16th century. It most likely had external buttresses placed where the collateral aisles are today. The four-part Gothic rib vaults over the nave transfer the weight of the roof downward and outwards to rows of columns, which form arcades with pointed arches.

The present choir, the area of the church where the clergy worship, was constructed in 1611 after a large crypt was built underneath the church. The choir in the Renaissance style, blended with rib vaults and other Gothic elements.

=== Chapels and the Crypt ===
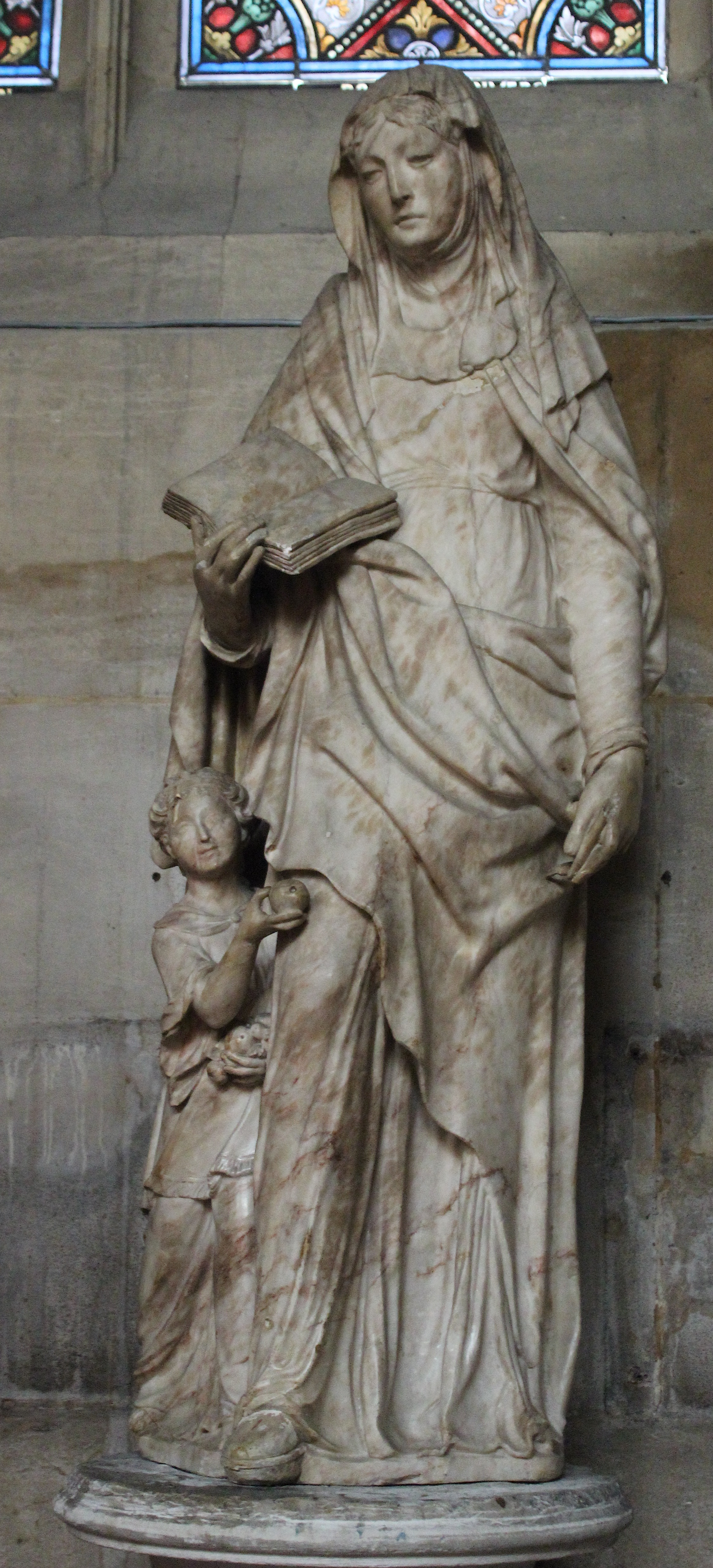
Statue of Saint Anne and the Virgin, by Jean Bullant (1515-1578)

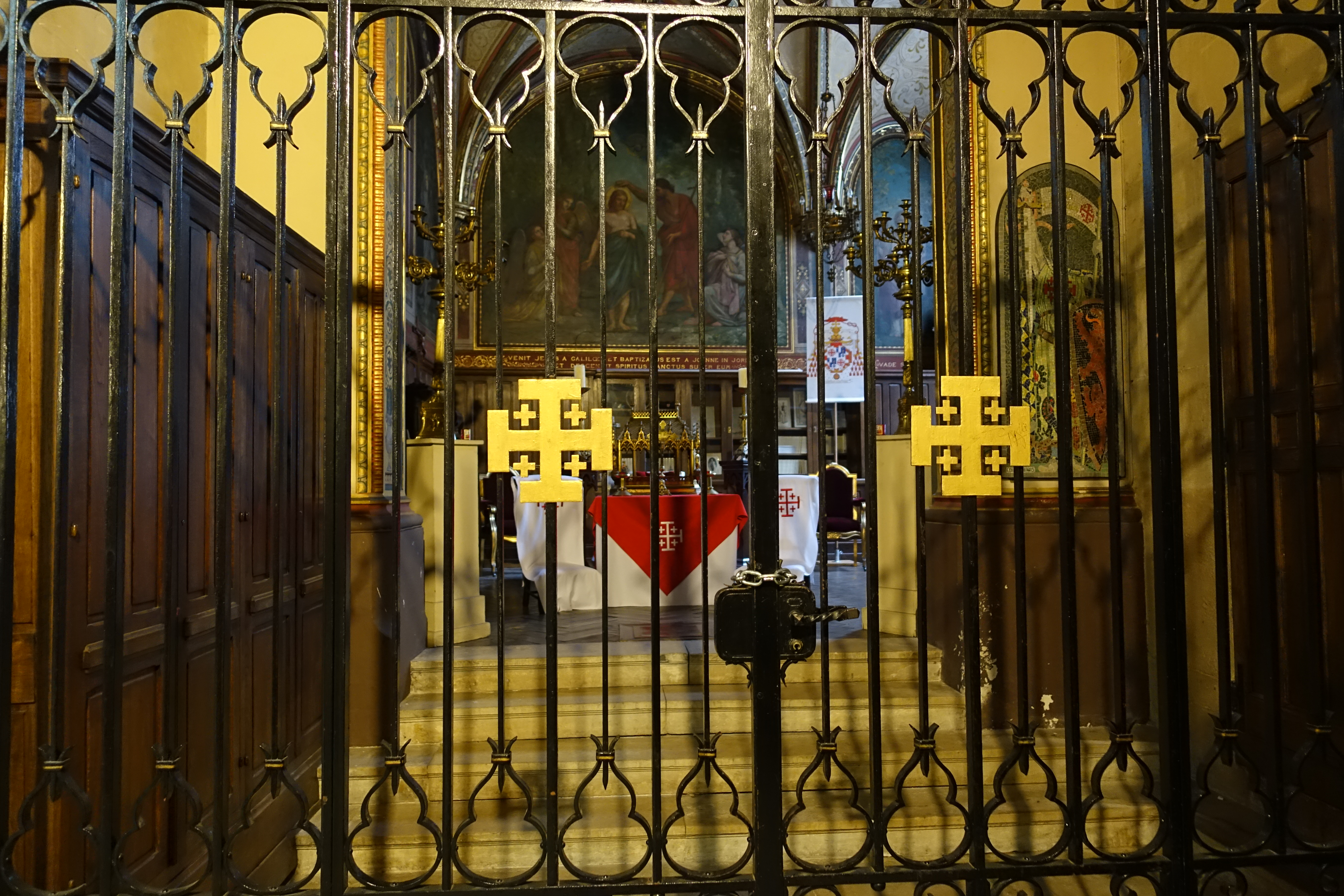
Gate of Chapel the Knights of the Holy Sepulchre, with Jerusalem crosses

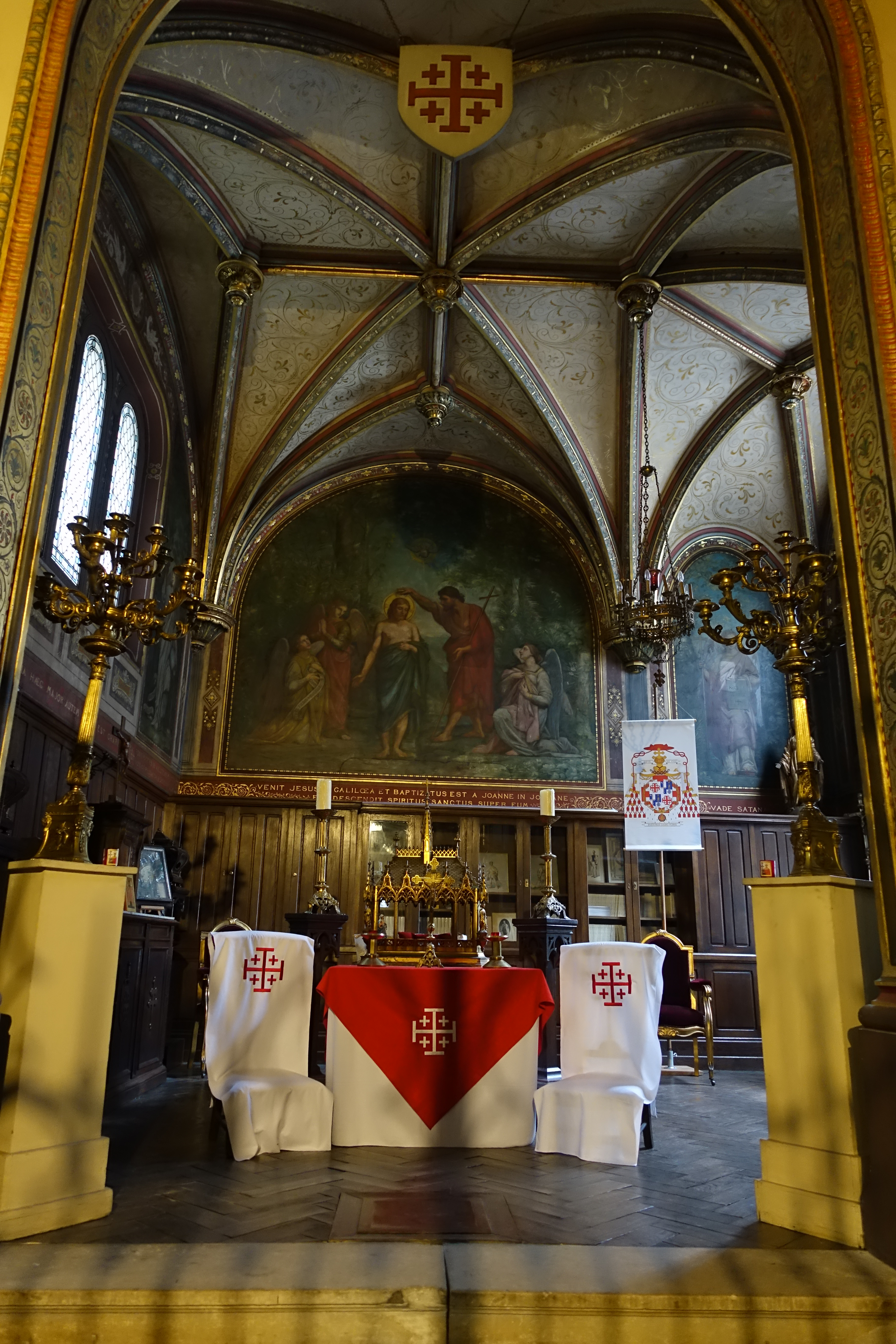
Interior of the Chapel of the Knights of the Holy Sepulchre

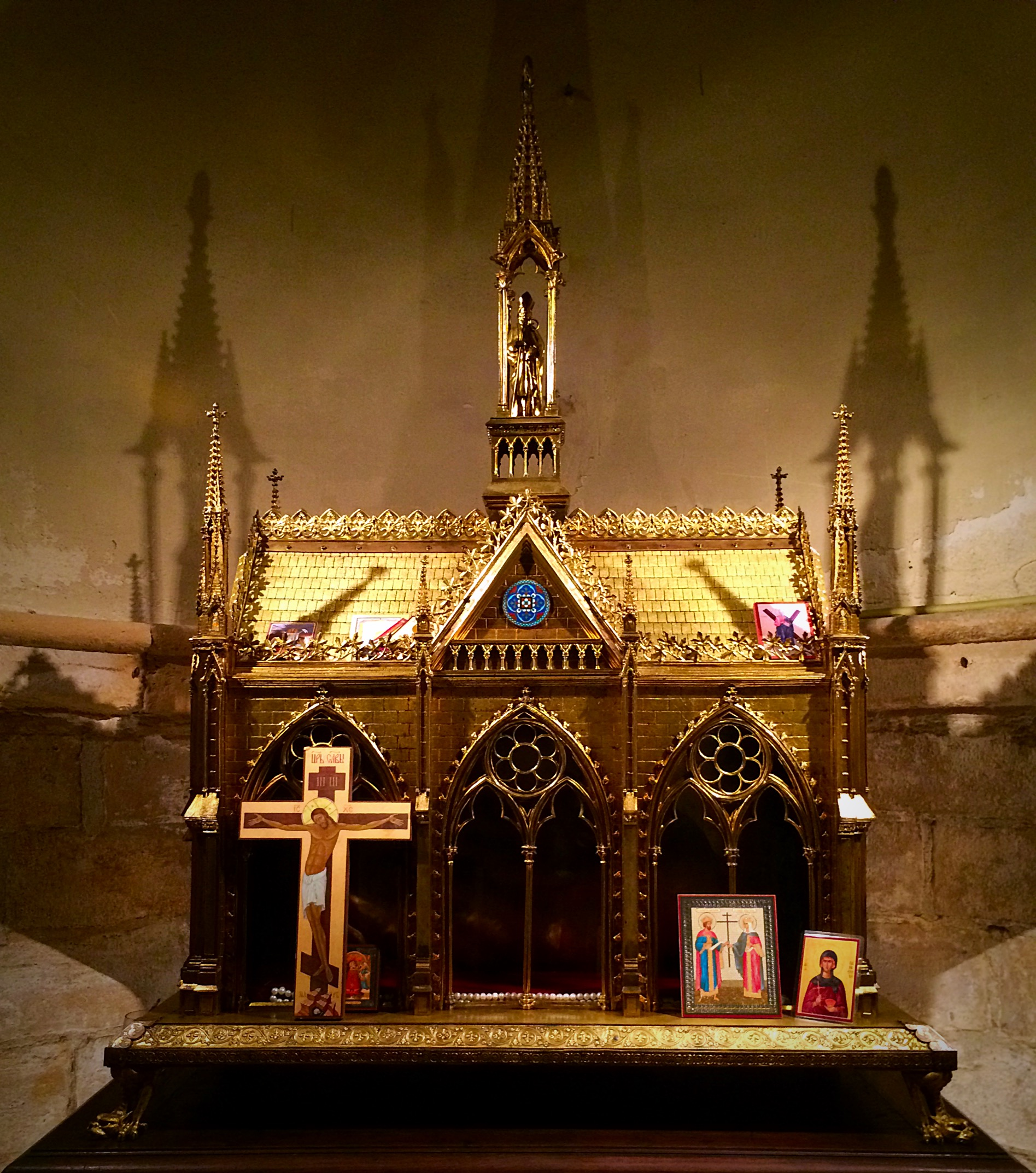
Reliquary of Saint Helena

The first chapel on the lower aisle on the left side dates from the 16th century, and was originally used for baptisms. It was later given for the exclusive use of the Order of the Knights of the Holy Sepulchre for their ceremonies and meetings. The gilded reliquary in the form of a church, which holds relics of the Saint Helen, is displayed here. The chapel has a very imposing cast iron gate decorated with emblems of the Maltese Cross, the symbol of the Order. The interior is decorated like a formal salon, with murals painted by the 19th-century artist Jean-Louis Bezard (1799-1881) depicting "The Baptism of Christ" and "The Original Sin". These were the last works painted by Bezard, whose paintings was strongly influenced by those of Raphael.

The second chapel displays a work of 16th-century sculpture by Jean Bullant (1550-1578), who was better-known as an architect than as a sculptor; his famous buildings included the Château de Chenonceau in the Loire Valley, bridging the River Cher. The statue depicts Saint Anne and education of the Virgin Mary; Mary is a smiling child, holding an apple, while Saint Anne, with a stern face, holds a book.

The Crypt was built beneath the choir in 1780 by architect Charles de Wailly. It was created for the Knights of the Holy Sepulchre, particularly to display the relics of Saint Helen, the mother of the Emperor Constantine, brought to France by the Knights of the Holy Sepulchre. Some of the relics are kept here, with others are in the reliquary of the chapel of the Knights of the Holy Sepulchre on the main floor.

== Stained Glass ==
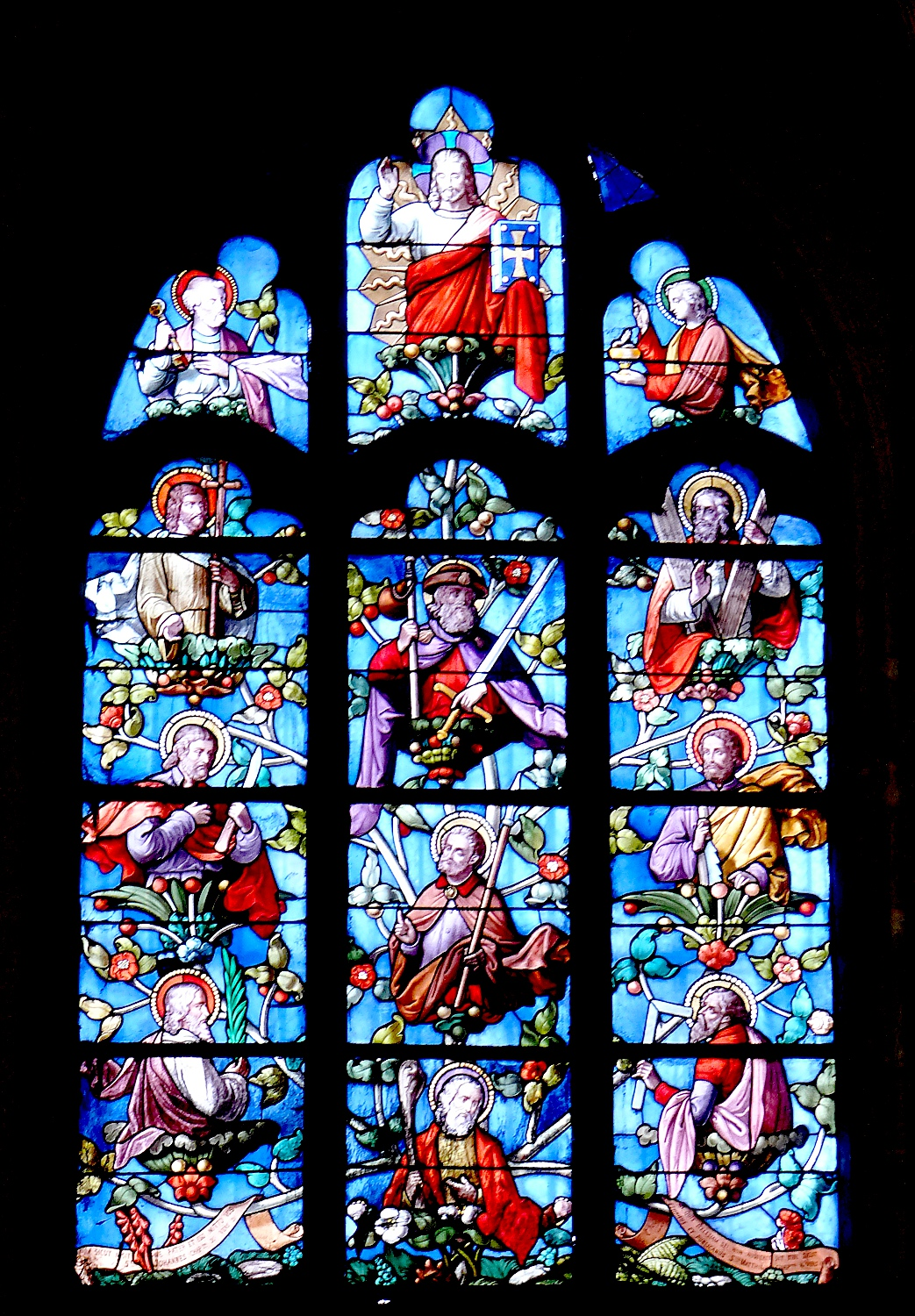
Window of the Apostles

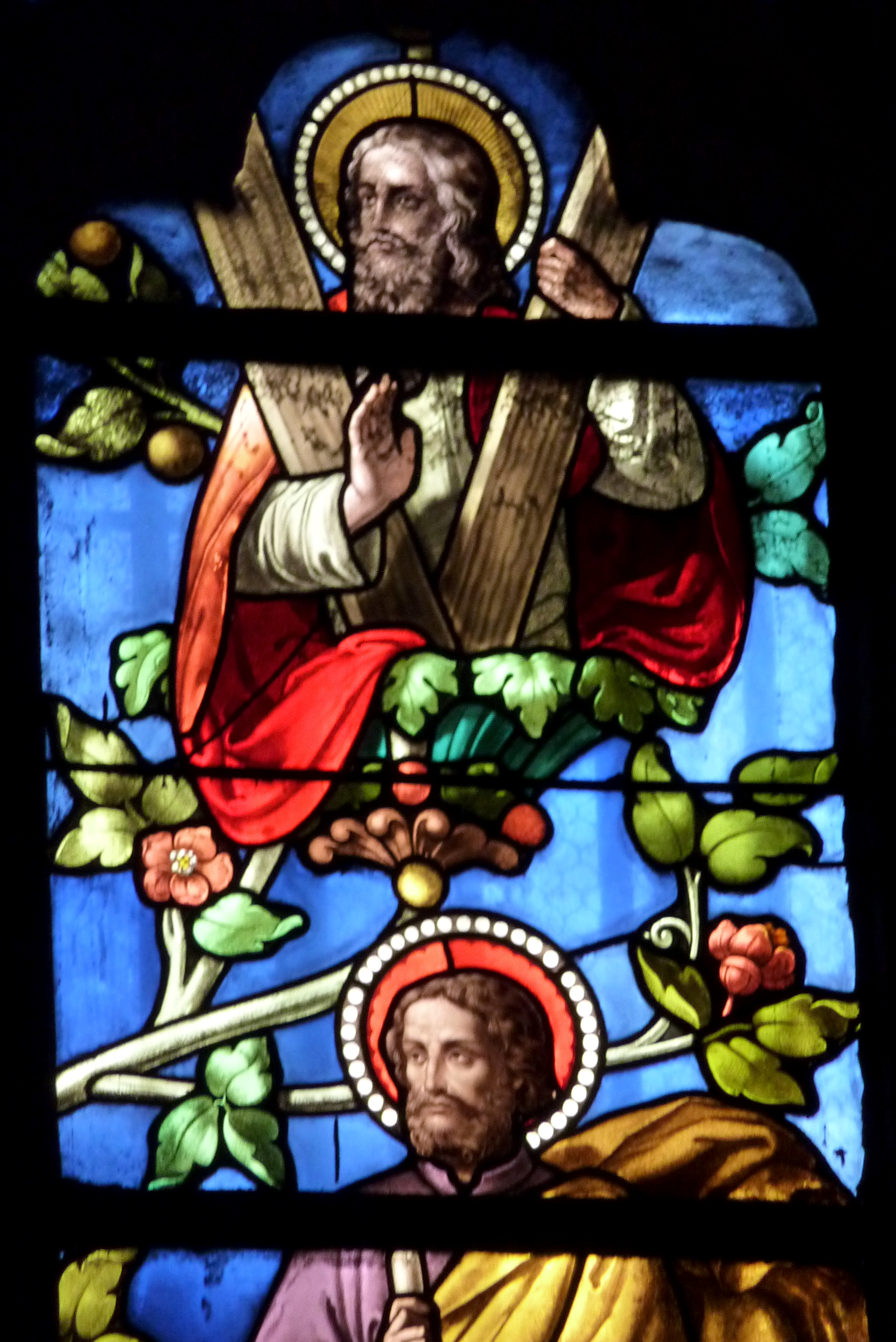
Detail of the Apostles window- St. Andrew (top) and Saint Simon

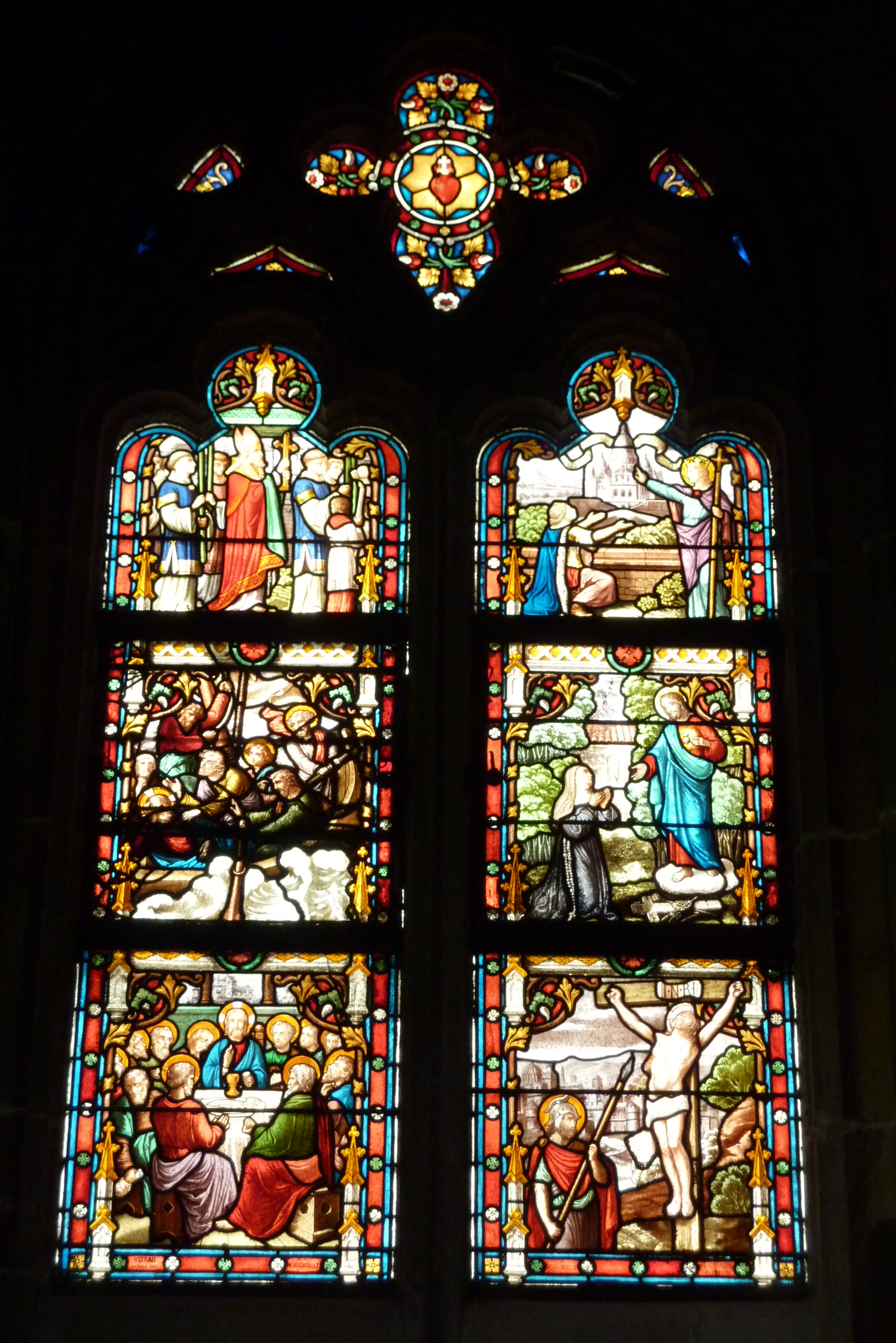
Sacred Heart Window

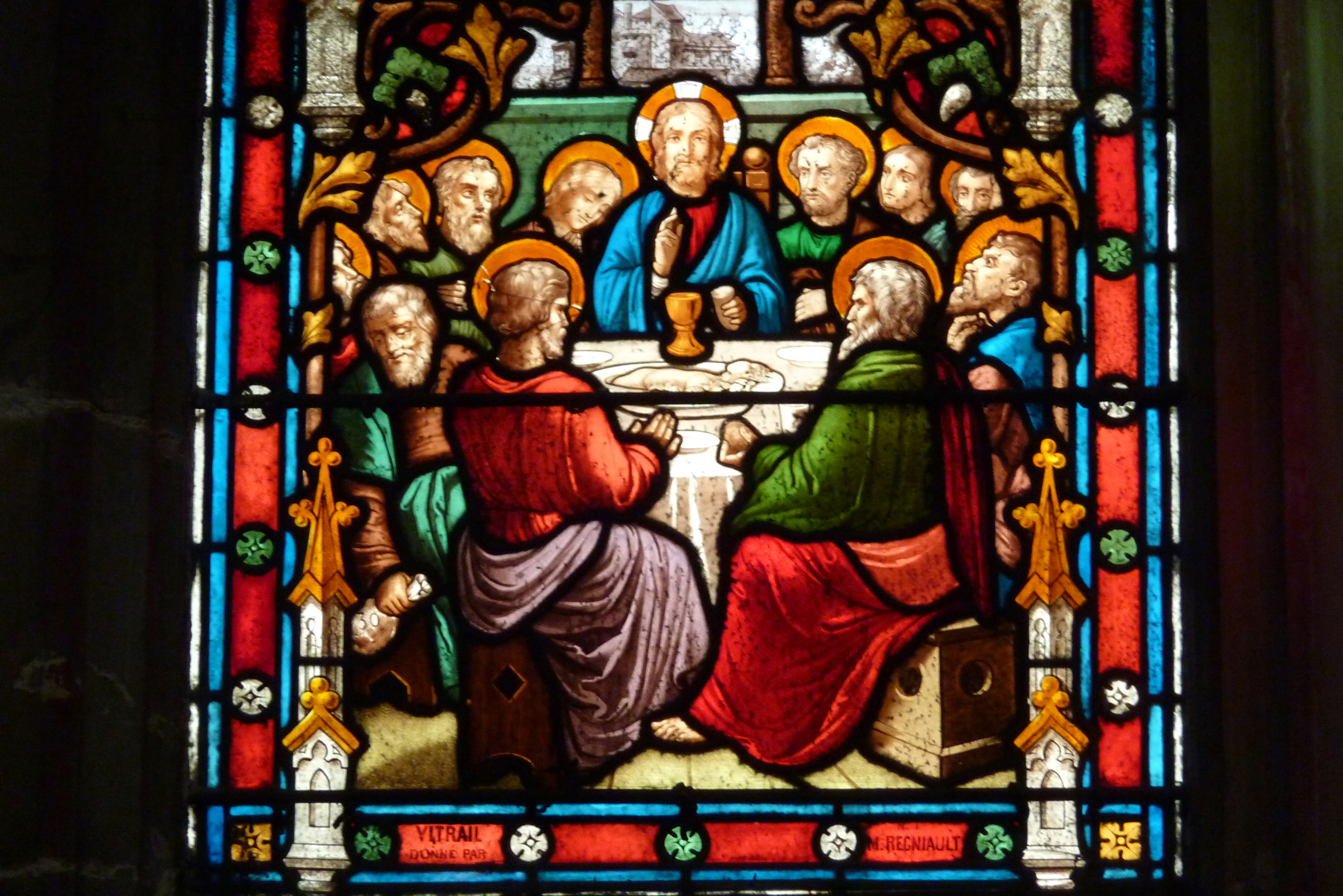
Detail of the Sacred Heart window by Henri Chaban

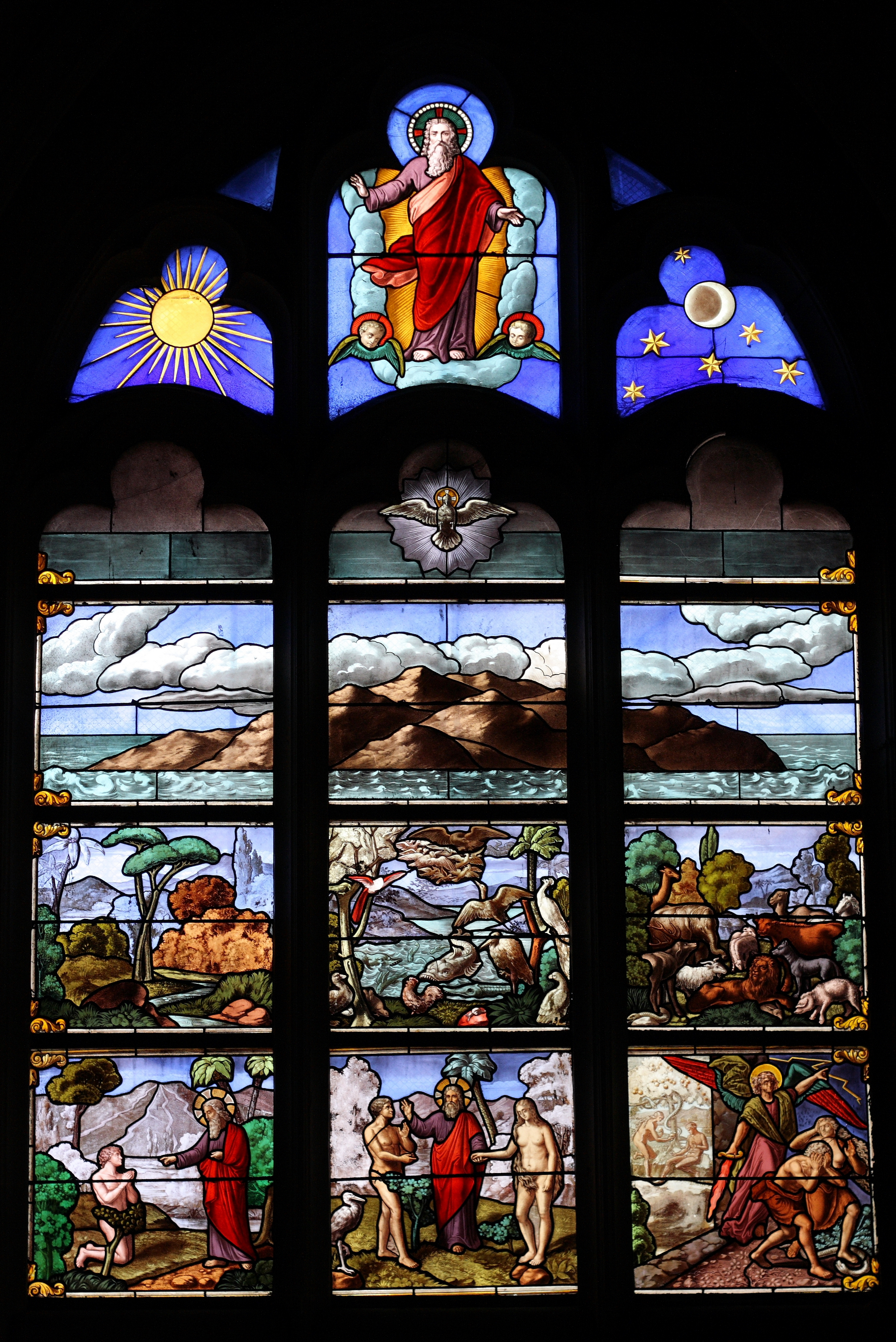
"The Creation" window

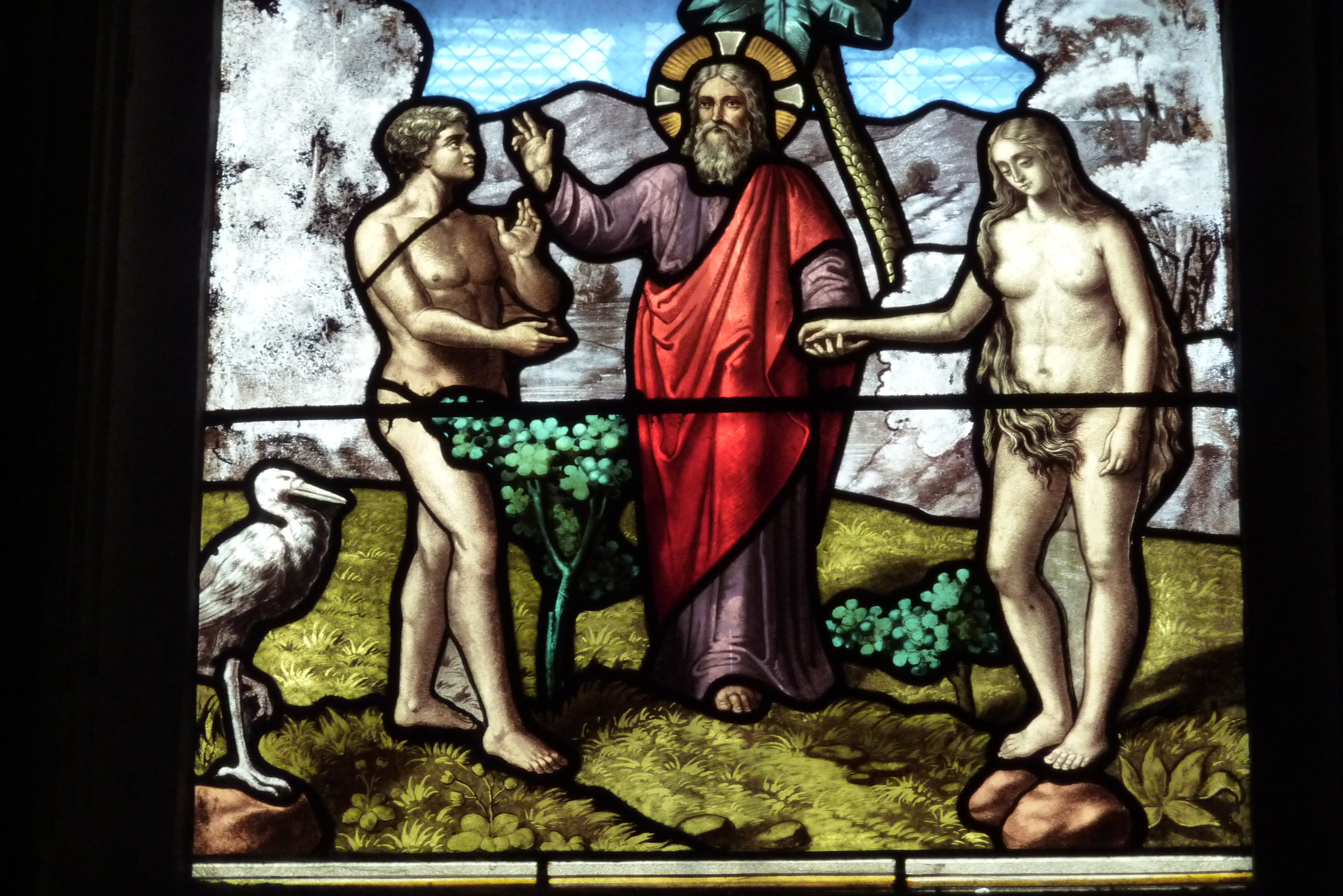
"Adam and Eve in the "Creation" window
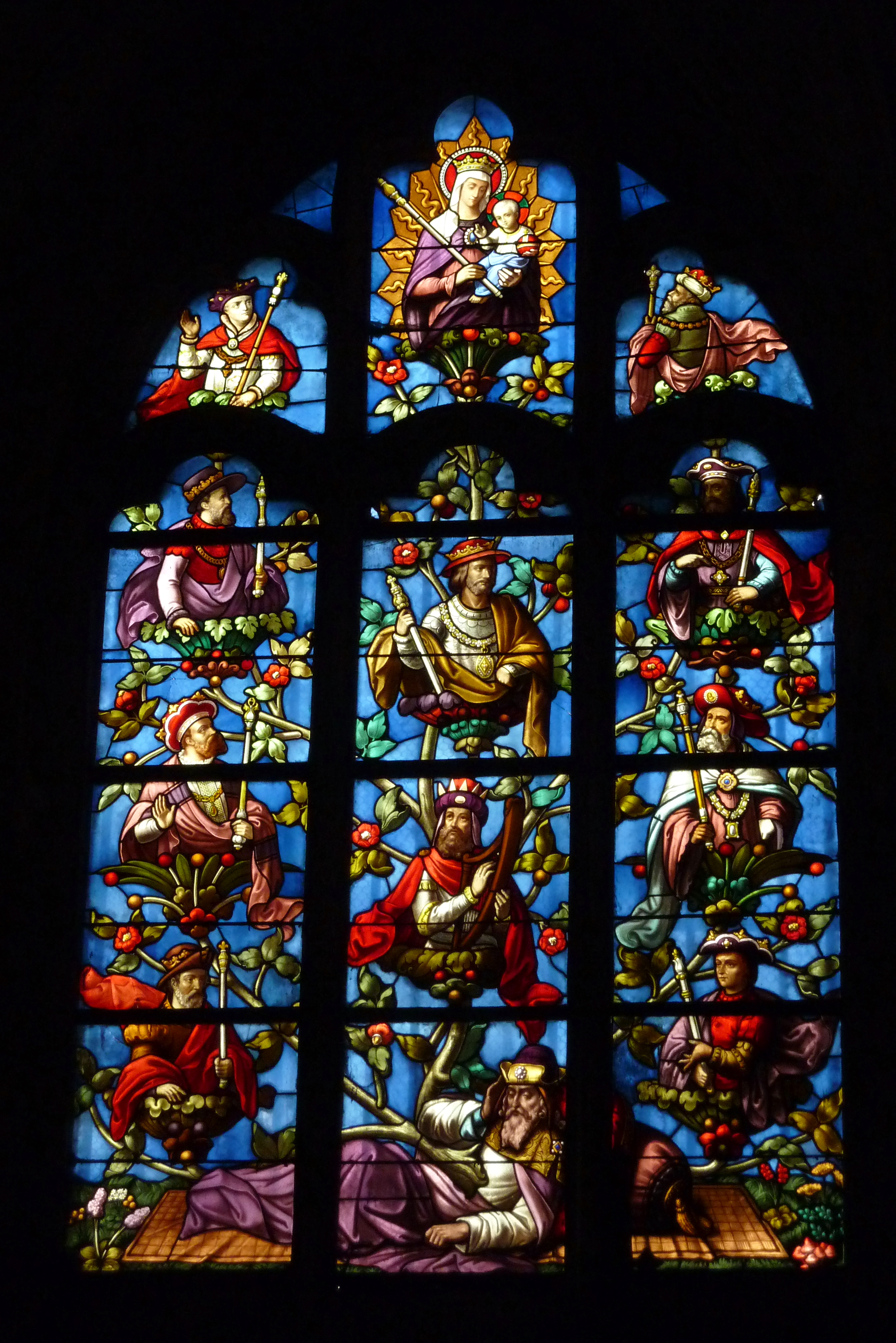
"The Tree of Jesse" window

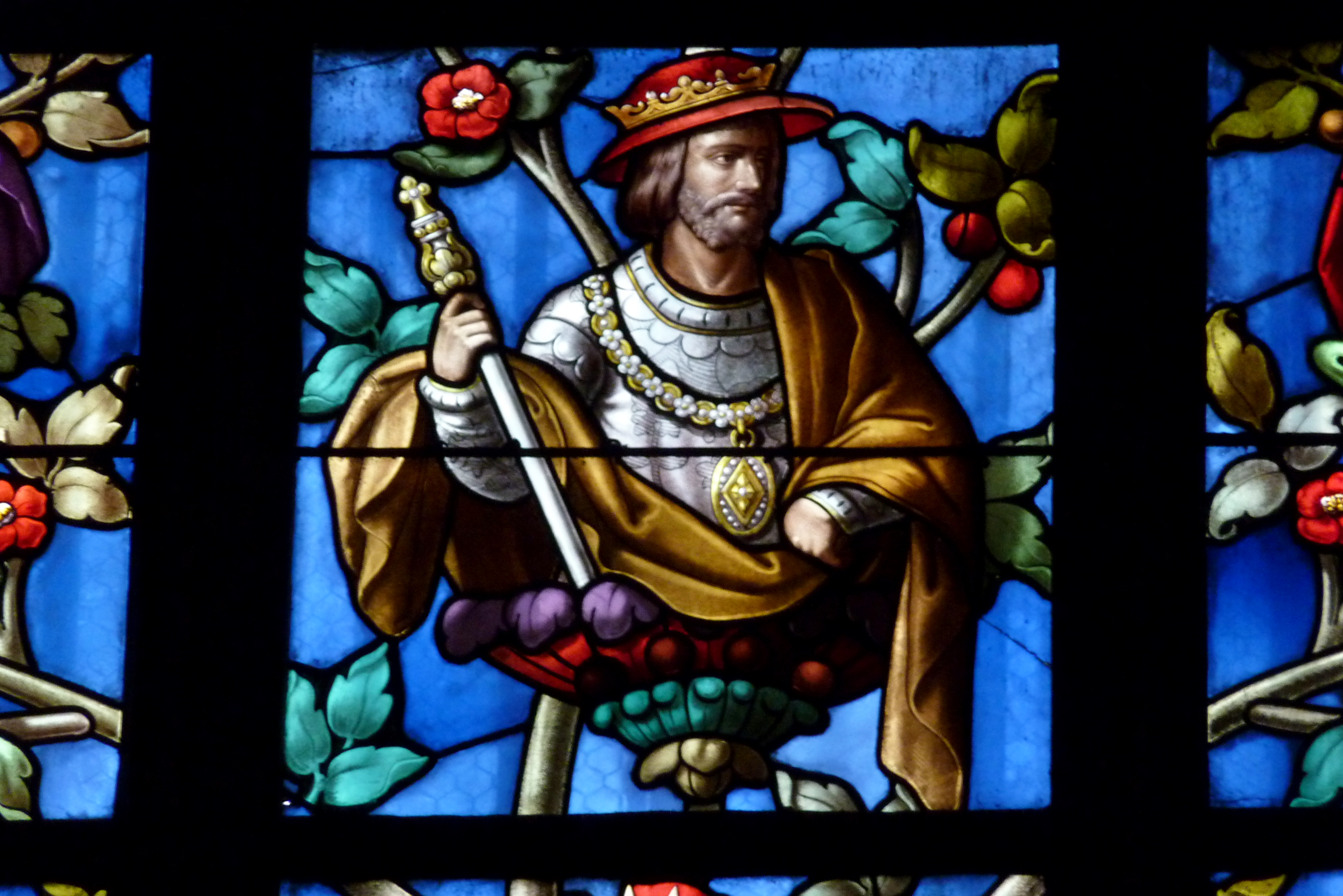
Detail of the "Tree of Jesse" window: A King of the Old Testament

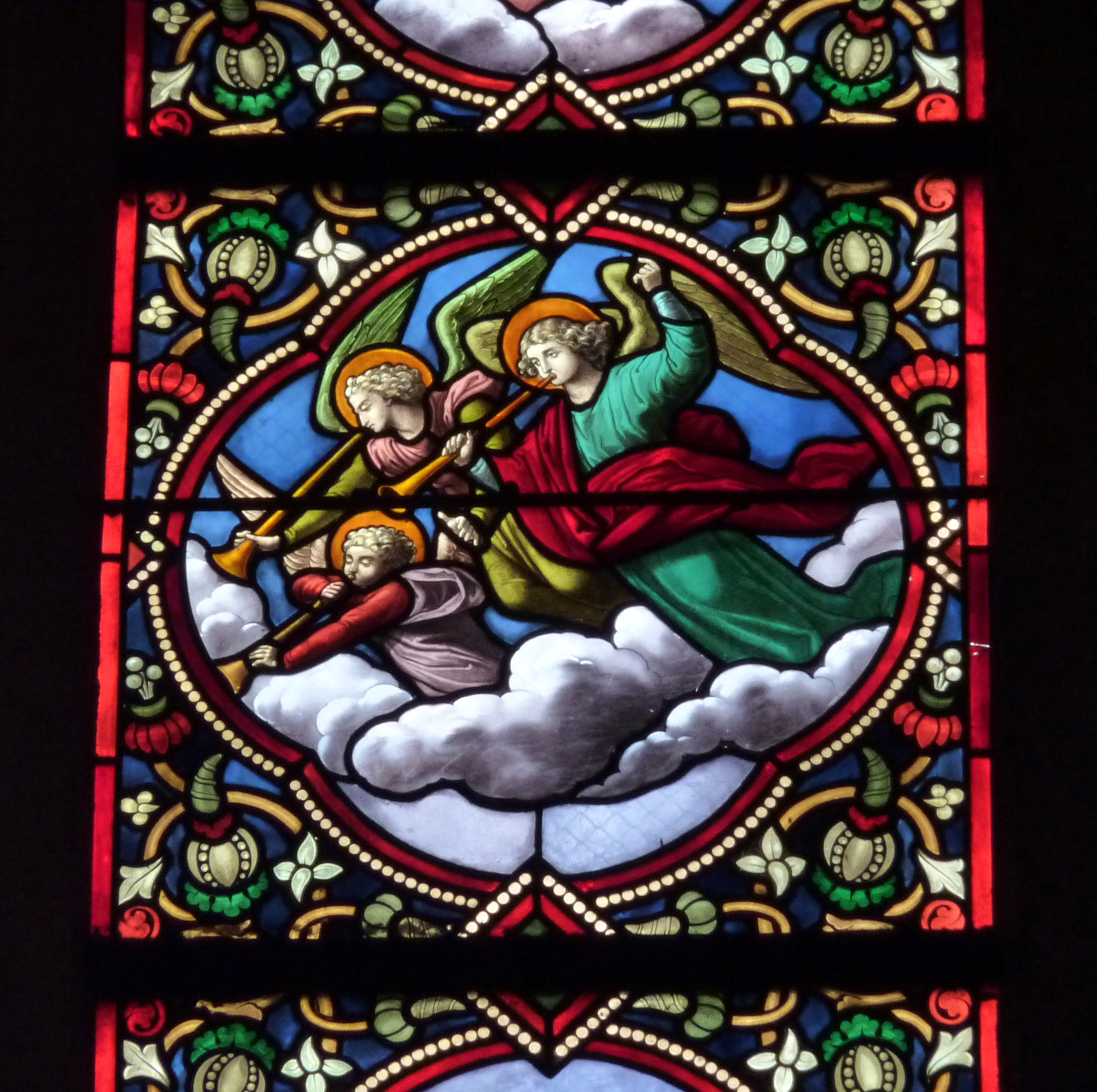
"Window of the Archangel Michael" - Angels sounding trumpets

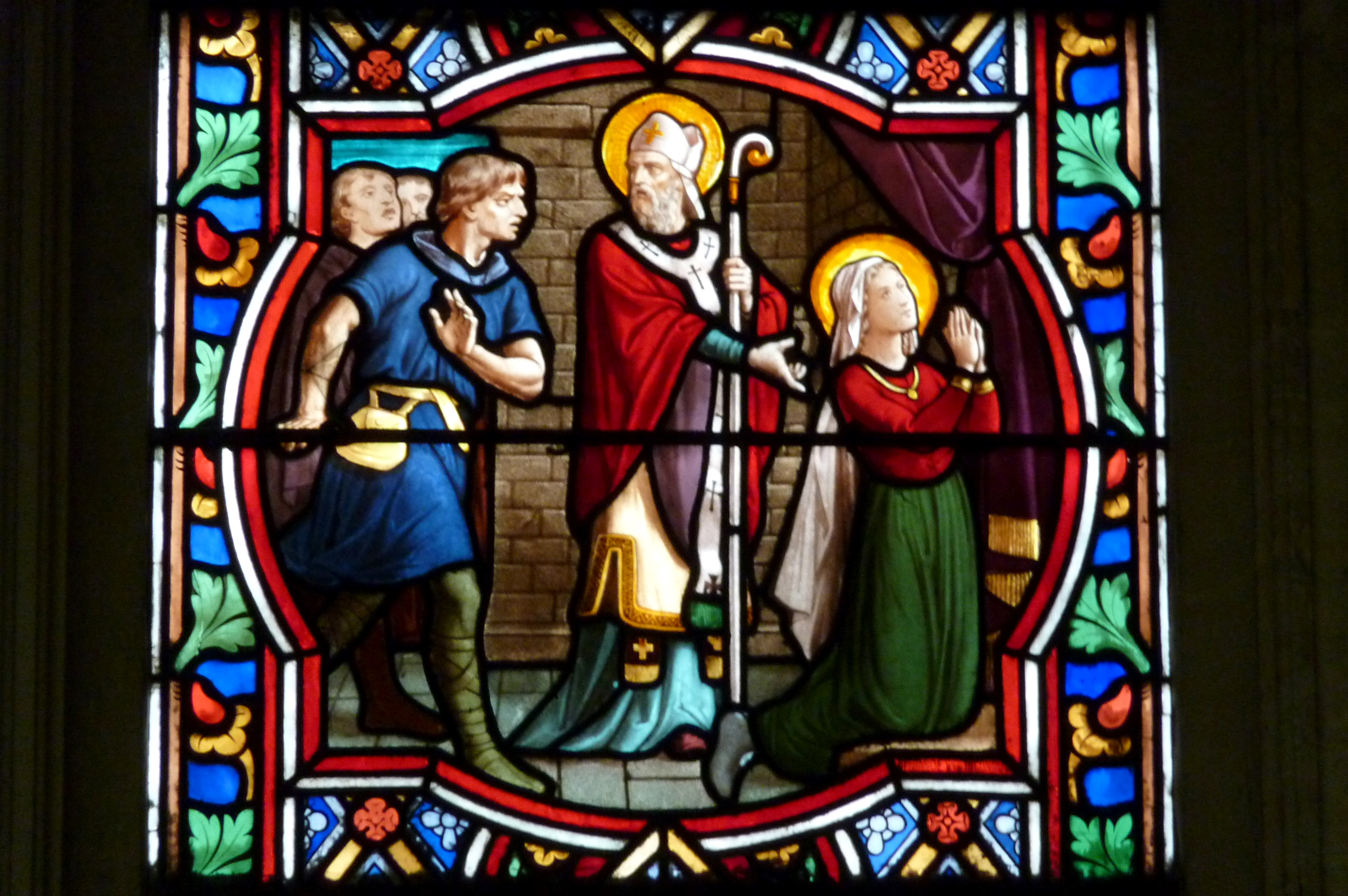
Saint Genevieve praying for the defenders of Paris against the Huns

The stained glass windows date to the 19th century, between about 1861 and 1869. They were made by Eugène-Stanislas Oudinot (1827–1889), Prosper Lafaye and Paul Nicod. The windows were damaged during the Paris Commune, but were restored by Henri Chabin between 1875 and 1881.

== Alabaster Sculpture ==
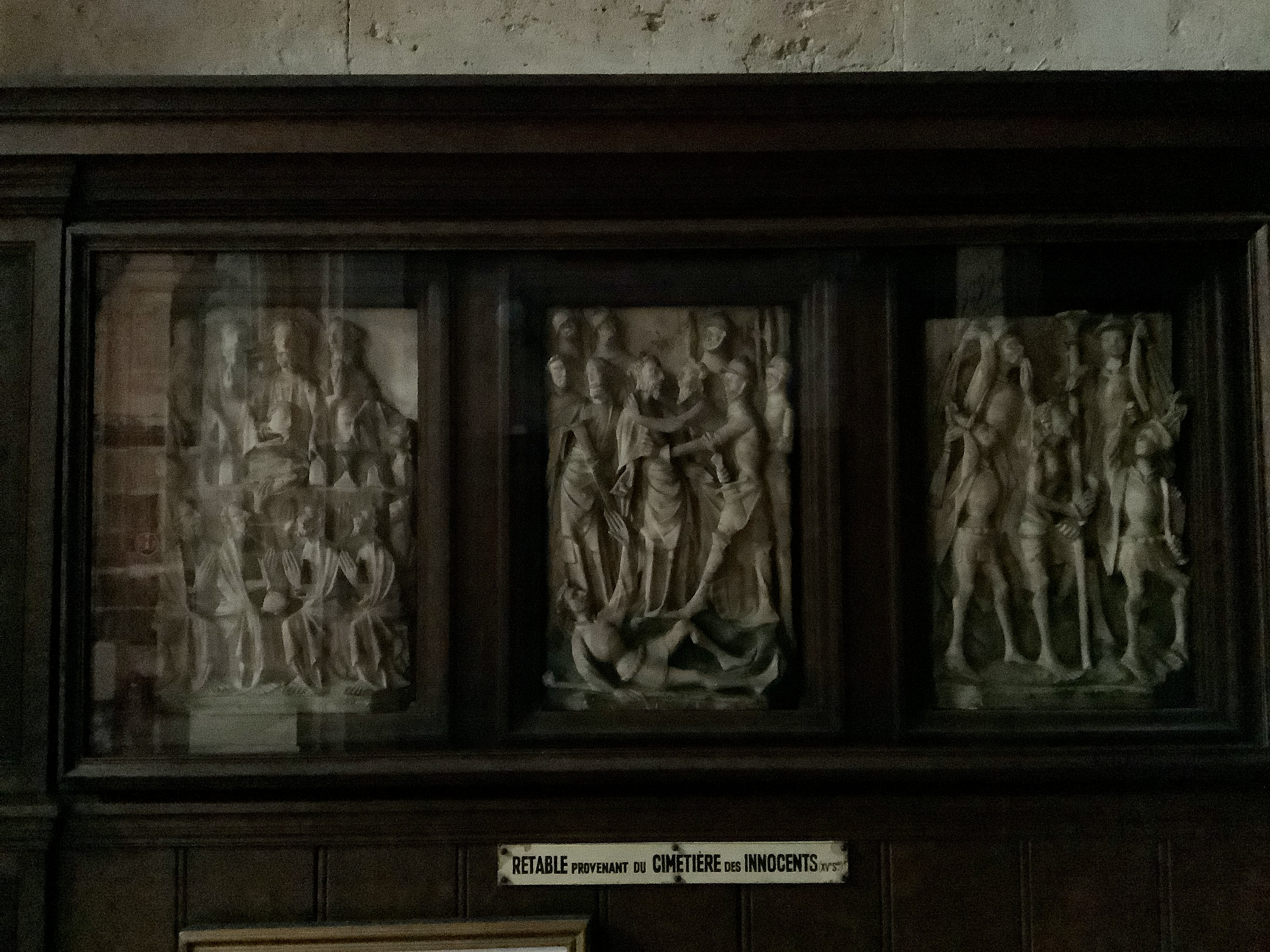

The disambulatory of the church displays an unusual art treasure; a retable with three bas-reliefs made of alabaster, depicting scenes from the life of Christ. They were created in Nottingham, England and date to the 15th century. They illustrate "The Last Supper", "The Kiss of Judas", 'and 'The Flagellation of Christ". They are made in a small format, designed for display in private oratories and in the altar pieces and retables of churches. According to tradition, these sculptures were originally located in Holy Innocents' Cemetery in Paris, the largest cemetery in Paris until the end of the 18th century.

== Organ ==
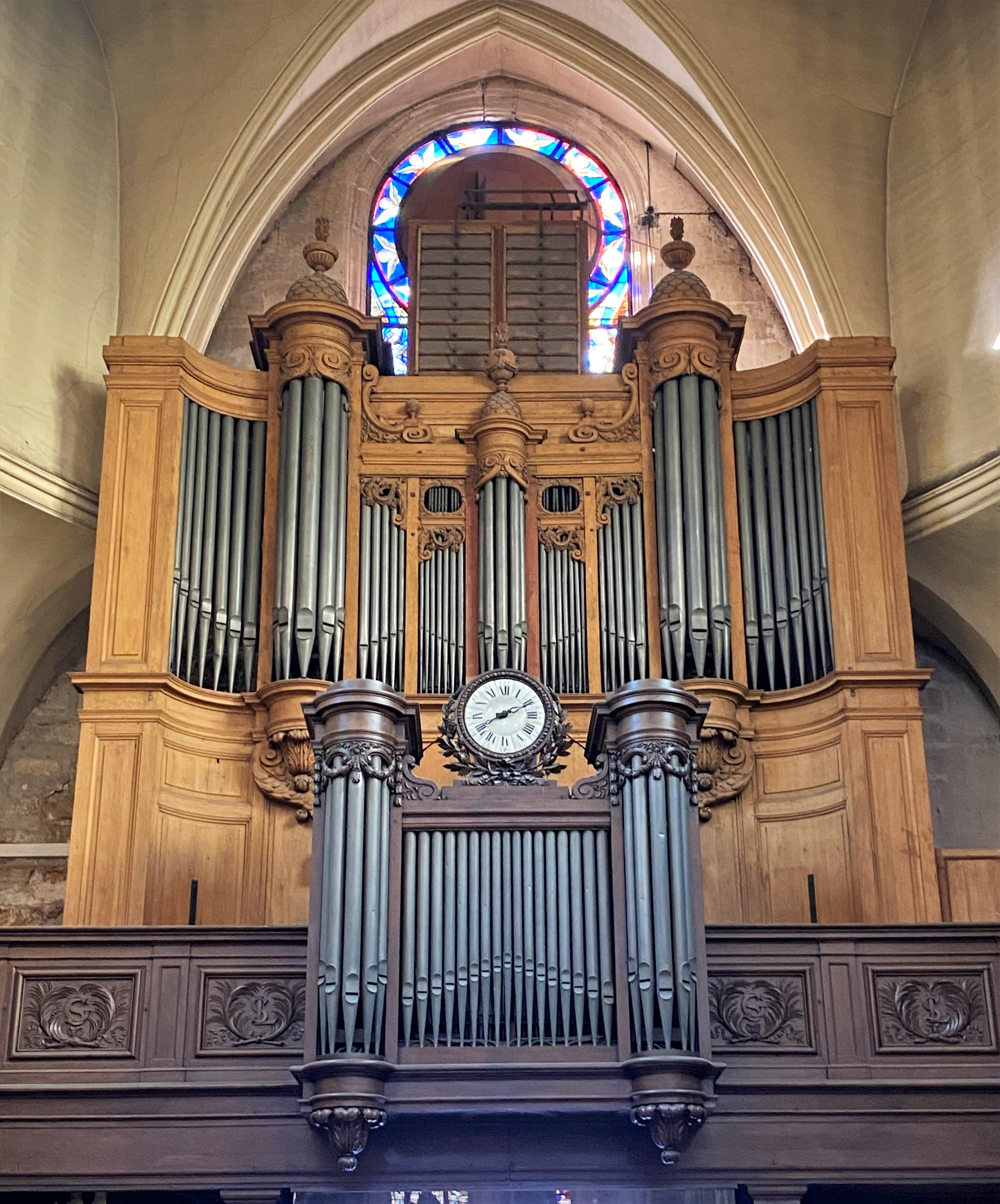
The main organ, on the tribune over the entrance

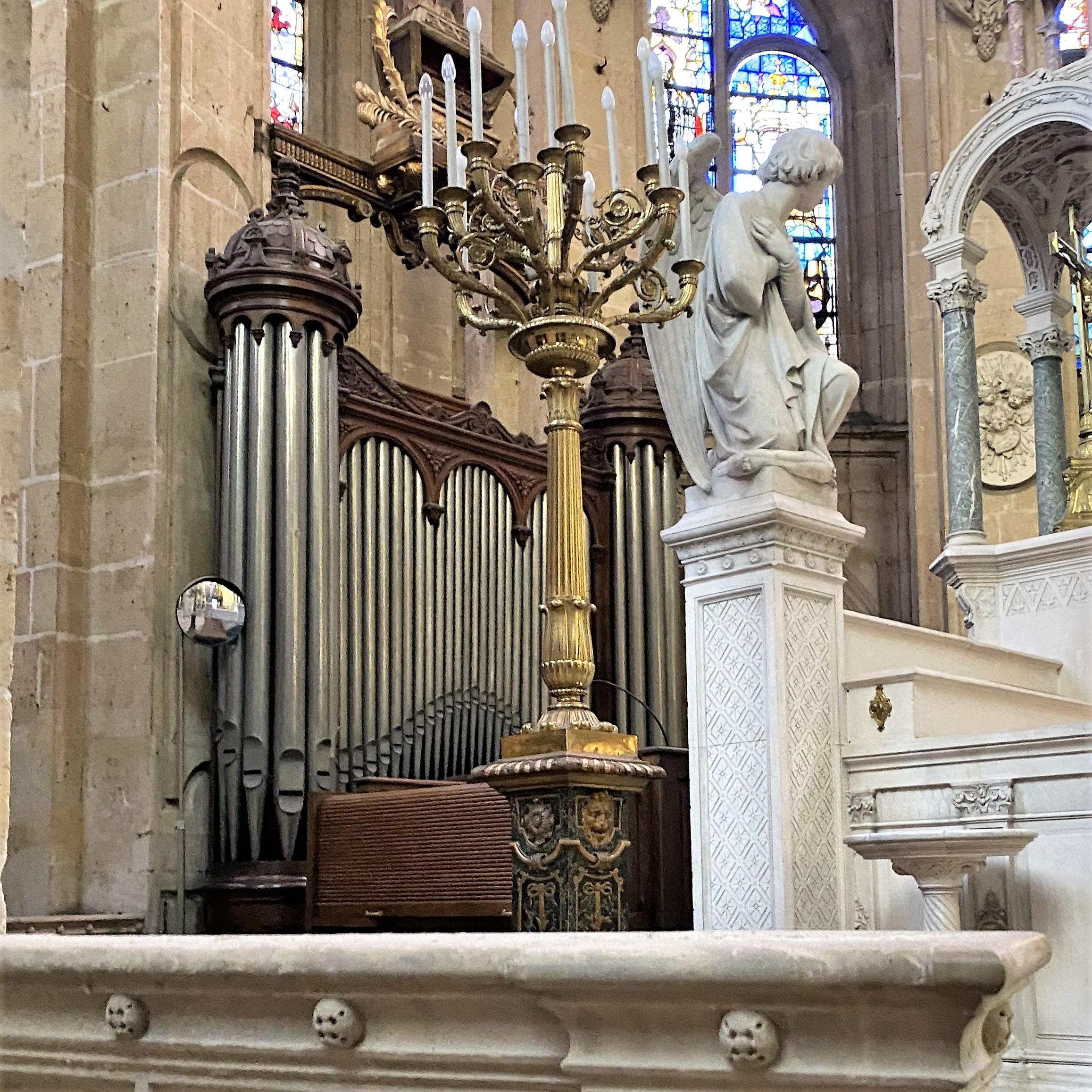
Choir Organ, behind the altar.

The church's main organ dates to shortly before 1603. It was enlarged between 1637 and 1659 by Guy Jolly, giving it three keyboards and a set of pedals for a total of 27 stops. A fourth keyboard and pedals were added in 1671.

The major part of the present organ was built by François-Henri Clicquot between 1786 and 1783. bringing the number of stops to twenty-eight. It was modified again by Louis Suret in 1855; he preserved most of the Clicquot organ, giving it five keyboards, one new, and an additional three to five stops. The next work was done in 1911 and 1912 by Mutin

The present instrument has three keyboards and a set of pedals, for a total of twenty-five stops. It was protected as an object of historical significance in 1915, and underwent further restoration in 1983

A smaller organ is located in the choir, behind the altar.

== See also ==
- List of historic churches in Paris

== Bibliography (in French) ==
- Dumoulin, Aline; Ardisson, Alexandra; Maingard, Jérôme; Antonello, Murielle; Églises de Paris (2017), Éditions Massin, Issy-Les-Moulineaux, ISBN 978-2-7072-0683-1 (in French)
