= Nivard =

7th-century Frankish bishop and Catholic saint

St. Nivard
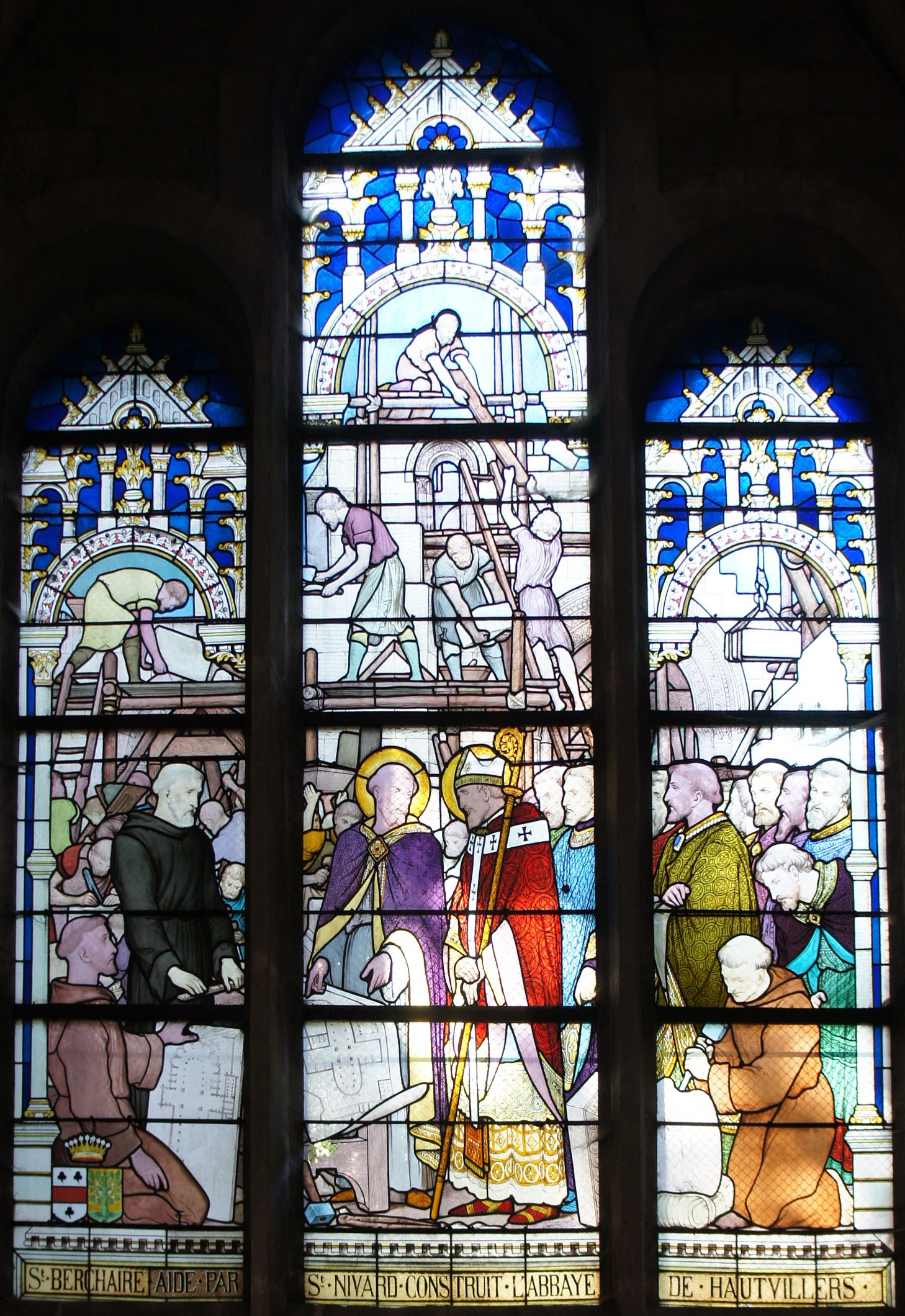
- Stained glass window in Hautvilliers Abbey depicting St Berchaire and St Nivard

Bishop of Rheims ca. 649 - 673
- Died: September 1, 673; Hautvillers, Marne, Grand Est, France
- Resting place: Abbey of St Peter, Hautvillers; 49.0819°N 3.9412°E
- Honored in: Roman Catholicism
- Feast: 1 September (Catholic)

Nivard (Latin: Nivardus/Nivo; Spanish: Nivardo; died 1 September 673) was the Bishop of Reims during the Merovingian Dynasty from approximately 649 until 673. He was later venerated as a medieval Catholic Saint.

== Life ==
Most of what is known about Nivard comes the Frankish priest and chronicler Flodoard and other ecclesiastical sources. Born into a Merovingian noble family, Nivard was the brother-in-law of the Frankish King Childeric II and was educated at the court of King Dagobert I in Metz.

He was ordained in the court of Clovis II and served as bishop during the reigns of Clotarius III, Childebert the Adopted, and Childeric II for an unspecified length of time until his death in 673. It is presumed he assumed the bishopric following the death of his predecessor Lando in 649, but most sources only list him as serving from sometime before 667.

Nivard was known primarily for his generosity, wealth and commitment to living modestly. In the Gallia christiana, in provincias ecclesiasticas distributa, he is described as having "been converted first in the king's court as a man of illustrious character," and credited with expanding the property of church by securing houses, land and slaves. Nivard is remembered well by Flodoard for enriching the church of Reims and obtaining a royal privilege of immunity from certain taxes.

He is often credited with rebuilding Hautvilliers Abbey around the year 650 alongside St Berchaire. Nivard also later built the monastery of Saint-Basle de Verzy at his own expense in 664 alongside multiple other churches and houses. Religious scholars credit him with instituting a unique privilege of immunity which recognized the right of the monks in Saint-Basle de Verzy and Hautvilliers to freely elect their abbot.

Nivard would later be buried at Hautvilliers Abbey after his death on September 1, 673.

== Veneration as a Saint ==
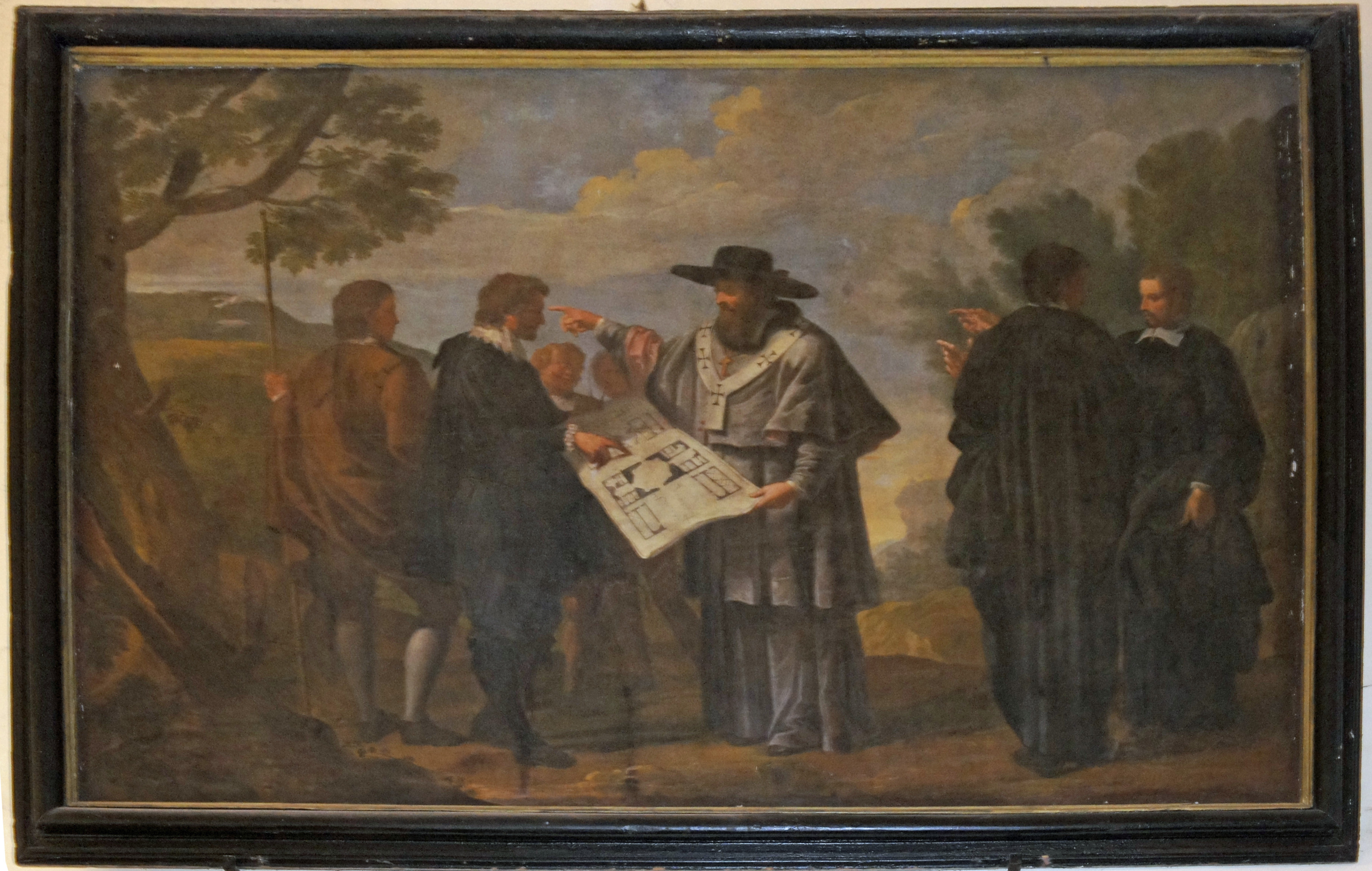
St Nivard and St Bercharius choosing the location of the abbey of Saint-Pierre d'Hautvillers - Claude Charles, "Saint Nivard donnant les plans du monastère d'Hautvillers"(1715)

St Nivard was venerated as a saint before the Catholic church adopted modern investigations performed by the Congregation for the Causes of Saints.

According to legend, St. Nivard and St Berchaire chose the site for the Hautvilliers Abbey after dreaming of a dove descending from heaven and landing upon a tree. Saint Nivard was later buried at the abbey upon his death and his relics are still held there. Folklore about Saint Nivard was later referenced and played upon by the 14th century poet Eustache Deschamps in some of his narrative works.

In most of his iconography he is depicted beside St Berchaire building the abbey of Saint-Pierre d'Hautvillers or dreaming of a dove.

Saint Nivard is recognized as a saint by the Catholic Church, and his feast day is September 1st.

== See also ==
- Hautvilliers Abbey
- Bercharius of Hautvilliers
- Abbaye Saint-Basle de Verzy (French)
- Archdiocese of Reims
- Règle de saint Colomban (French)

Catholic Church titles
Preceded by Lando	Bishop of Rheims ca. 657–673	Succeeded by Rieul of Reims
