= Hautvillers Abbey =

Abbey in the Marne, France

- Abbaye Saint-Pierre d'Hautvillers
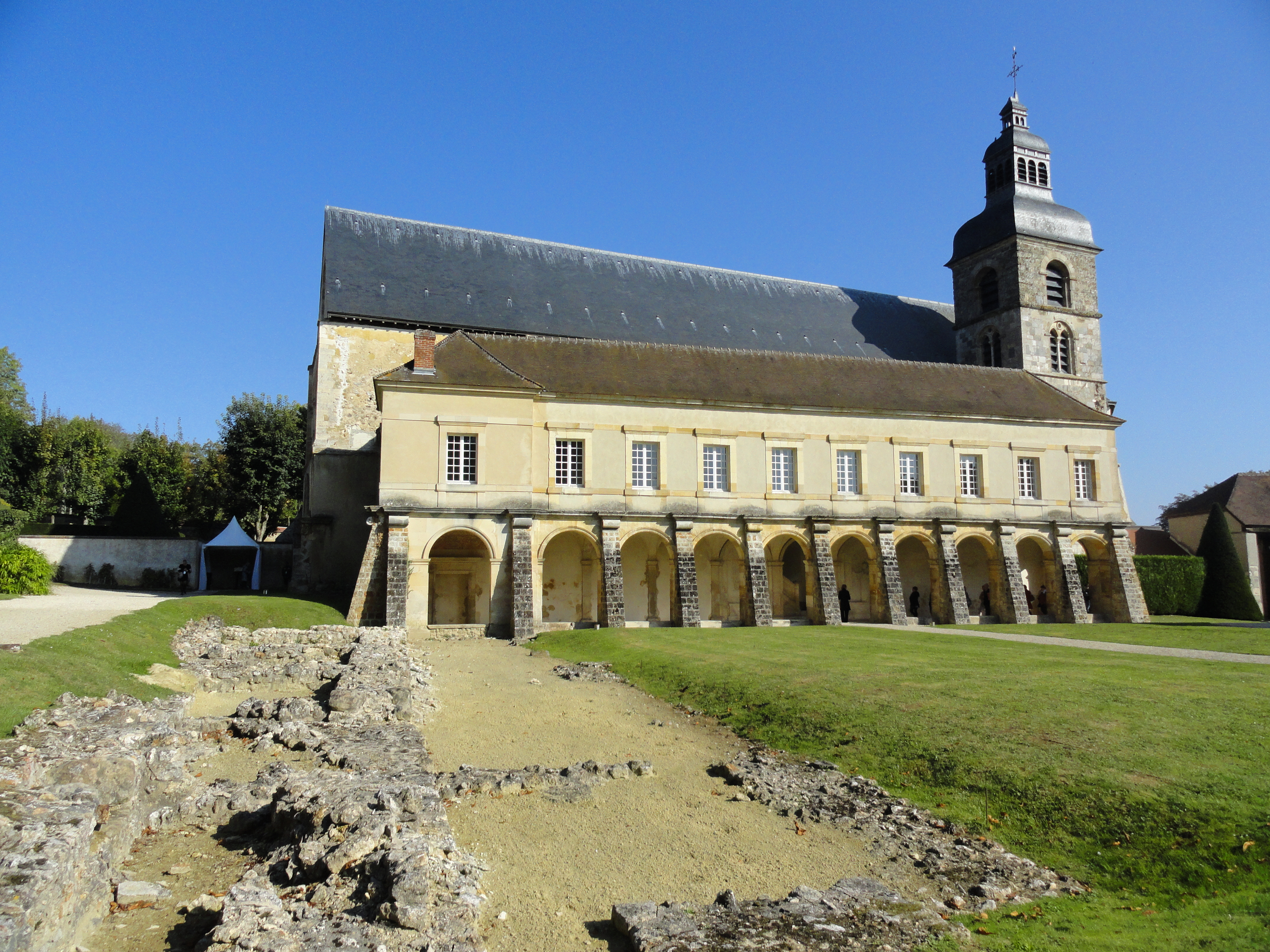
- Interactive map of Hautvillers Abbey

Monastery information
- Order: Benedictine
- Established: 665
- Disestablished: 1789

Architecture
- Heritage designation: Classé monument historique

Site
- Location: Hautvillers, Marne, Grand Est, France
- Coordinates: 49.0819°N 3.9412°E

Hautvillers Abbey, or more formally the Abbey of St Peter, Hautvillers (French: Abbaye Saint-Pierre d'Hautvillers), is a former Benedictine monastery in the Hautvillers commune of the Marne department in north-eastern France. The abbey remained active between 665 and the French Revolution of 1789. It housed the relics of Saint Helena, Empress and mother of Constantine, between 841 and 1819. One of its monks, Dom Pérignon, contributed to the development of sparkling wine in the Champagne region. The building has been classified as a monument of historical value since 1983.

== Middle Ages ==
The abbey was founded in 650 by Saint Nivard, Bishop of Reims. According to legend, a dove indicated where to build an abbey that would follow the order of Saint Benedict and Saint Columbanus. The abbey flourished under the Carolingian dynasty and drew great renown thanks to its manuscripts, such as the Ebbo Gospels and perhaps the Utrecht Psalter.

Saint Rieul joined the abbey in 662, before succeeding Saint Nivard as Archbishop of Reims in 669. In 841 a priest from Reims stole the relic of the body of Saint Helena from Rome and the reliquary was transferred to the abbey. The relics attracted pilgrims and the revenues allowed the abbey to purchase lands and vineyards in the vicinity (40 hectares).

The remaining relics of St. Helena stayed in the monastery until the French Revolution broke out. The monastery was destroyed but the cellarer was able to hide the relics until they could be safely transported to Paris for public veneration again. They were then entrusted to the Knights of the Holy Sepulchre and installed in their church, Saint-Leu-Saint-Gilles de Paris, in 1819.
