= Berthar =

Berthar (Latin: Bertharius, Bertarius, Bercharius or Bercarius) is a masculine Germanic given name meaning "glorious warrior". The name Charibert has the same meaning, combining the same two roots in reverse order. In its variant spellings, it may refer to:

- Bertachar, king of Thuringia (520s–530s)
- Berthar, Transjuran Frank who fought in the Battle of Autun (640s)
- Bercharius of Montier-en-Der, founder and first abbot (666)
- Bercharius of Hautvillers (died 685), abbot
- Berchar, mayor of the palace of Neustria and Burgundy (686–687)
- Bertarius of Verdun (fl. c. 857), priest and author
- Bertharius of Monte Cassino, abbot (856–883)
