= Charibert =

Charibert is a Frankish given name meaning "glorious warrior". The name Berthar contains the same two elements in reversed order. It is the same name as Herbert, Heribert and Aribert.

Famous persons with this name include:

- Charibert I, king of the Franks (561–567)
- Charibert II, king of the Franks (629–632)
- Charibert of Hesbaye (fl. 6th century), Neustrian nobleman
- Charibert of Laon (fl. 721), Austrasian count
