= Bercharius of Hautvillers =

Abbot of Hautevillers

Saint Bercharius
- Born: 636
- Died: March 28, 696
- Venerated in: Roman Catholic Church
- Feast: 16 October

Saint Bercharius (Bererus; French: Berchaire) (636 – March 28, 696) was abbot of Hautvillers in Champagne. Descended from a distinguished Aquitanian family, he received his instruction from Saint Nivard (Nivo), Archbishop of Reims.

Bercharius entered the monastery of Luxeuil under Saint Walbert, and soon stood out from the rest of his fellow-novices. Upon his return to Reims he persuaded Saint Nivard to establish the monastery of Hautvillers. Bercharius himself became the first abbot. Entirely given up to prayer and meditation he also instructed his brethren to lead a contemplative life.

He founded two religious houses in the Diocese of Châlons-sur-Marne, the one (Puisye or Montier-en-Der Abbey) for men, the other (Pellmoutier or Puellarum Monasterium) for women. These institutions he enriched by donations of valuable relics, procured on a journey to Rome and the Holy Land.

The monk Daguin, provoked by a reprimand from Bercharius, stabbed him during the night. According to one account, Bercharius did not condemn or complain about the injury he received, but instead asked Daguin to perform penance and to make a pilgrimage to Rome to obtain pardon and absolution. Daguin left the monastery never to return. After two days of severe suffering, the saint succumbed to his wound, and was considered a martyr.

== Veneration ==
His remains were preserved at Moutier-en-Der until the suppression of religious orders in the 1790s.

The commemoration of his name occurs in the martyrology on 16 October.
