= Hautvillers =

- Commune
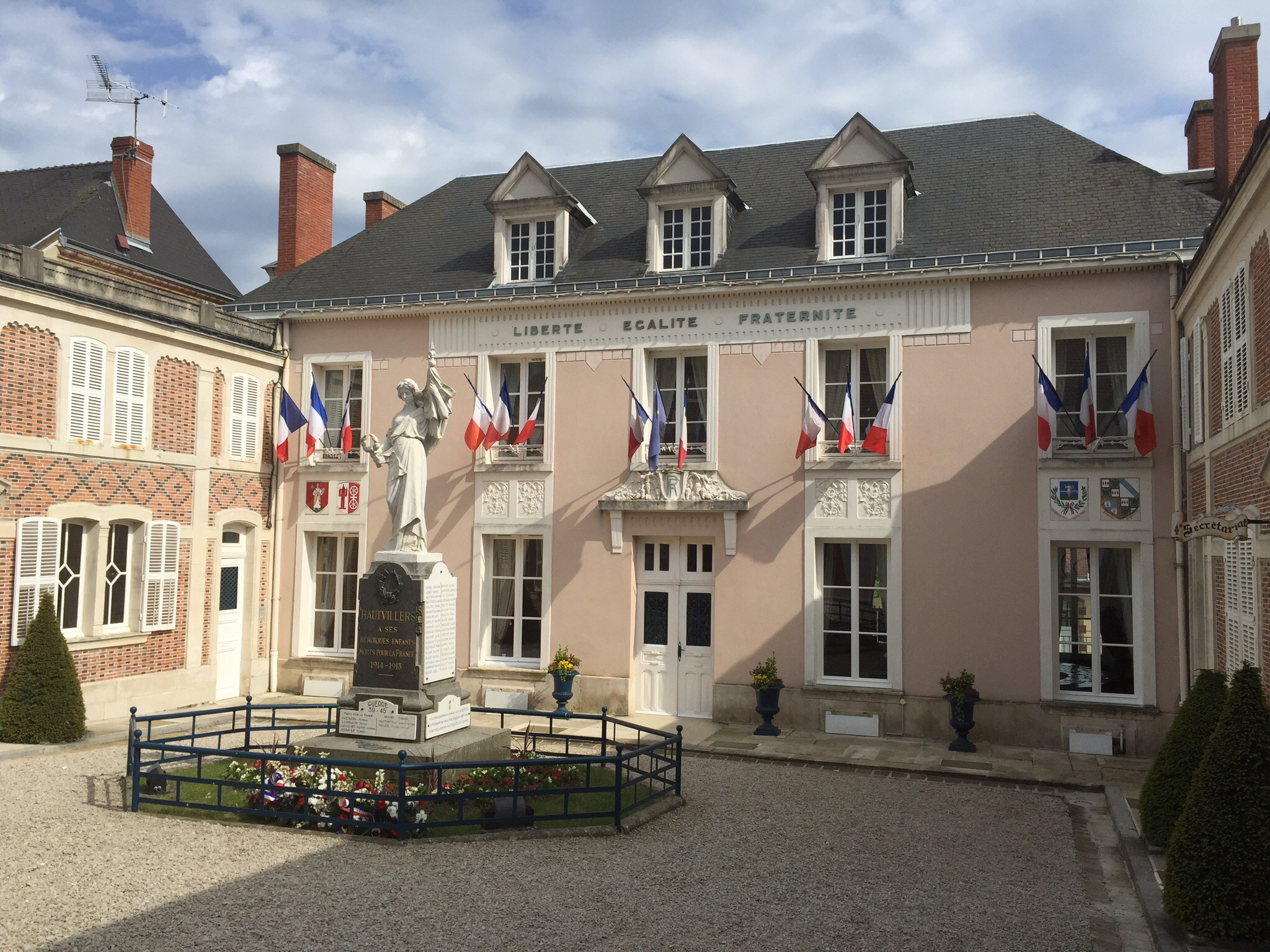
- The town hall in Hautvillers

- Coat of arms
- Location of Hautvillers
- Location within France Location within Grand Est
- Coordinates: 49°05′06″N 3°56′40″E
- Country: France
- Region: Grand Est
- Department: Marne
- Arrondissement: Épernay
- Canton: Épernay-1
- Intercommunality: Grande Vallée de la Marne

Government
  - Mayor (2020–2026): Silvère Pierrot
- Area^{1}: 11.77 km^{2} (4.54 sq mi)
- Elevation: 195 m (640 ft)
- Population (2023): 608
  - Density: 51.7/km^{2} (134/sq mi)
- Time zone: UTC+01:00 (CET)
  - Summer (DST): UTC+02:00 (CEST)
- INSEE/Postal code: 51287 /51160
- ^{1} French Land Register data, which excludes lakes, ponds, glaciers > 1 km^{2} (0.386 sq mi or 247 acres) and river estuaries.

Hautvillers (French pronunciation: [ovile]) is a commune in the Marne department in north-eastern France.

The Abbey of St. Peter which existed here until the French Revolution was the home of the famous Dom Perignon, a Benedictine monk whose work in wine-making helped to develop champagne. Because of the region's testimony to the development of champagne and unique agro-industrial system, the nearby vineyards, harvest huts, presses, and cellars were inscribed on the UNESCO World Heritage List in 2015 as part of the Champagne hillsides, houses and cellars site. The underground cellars, used for storing and fermenting the champagne, were built in the late 17th century and are some of the first cellars specifically dedicated to storing champagne.

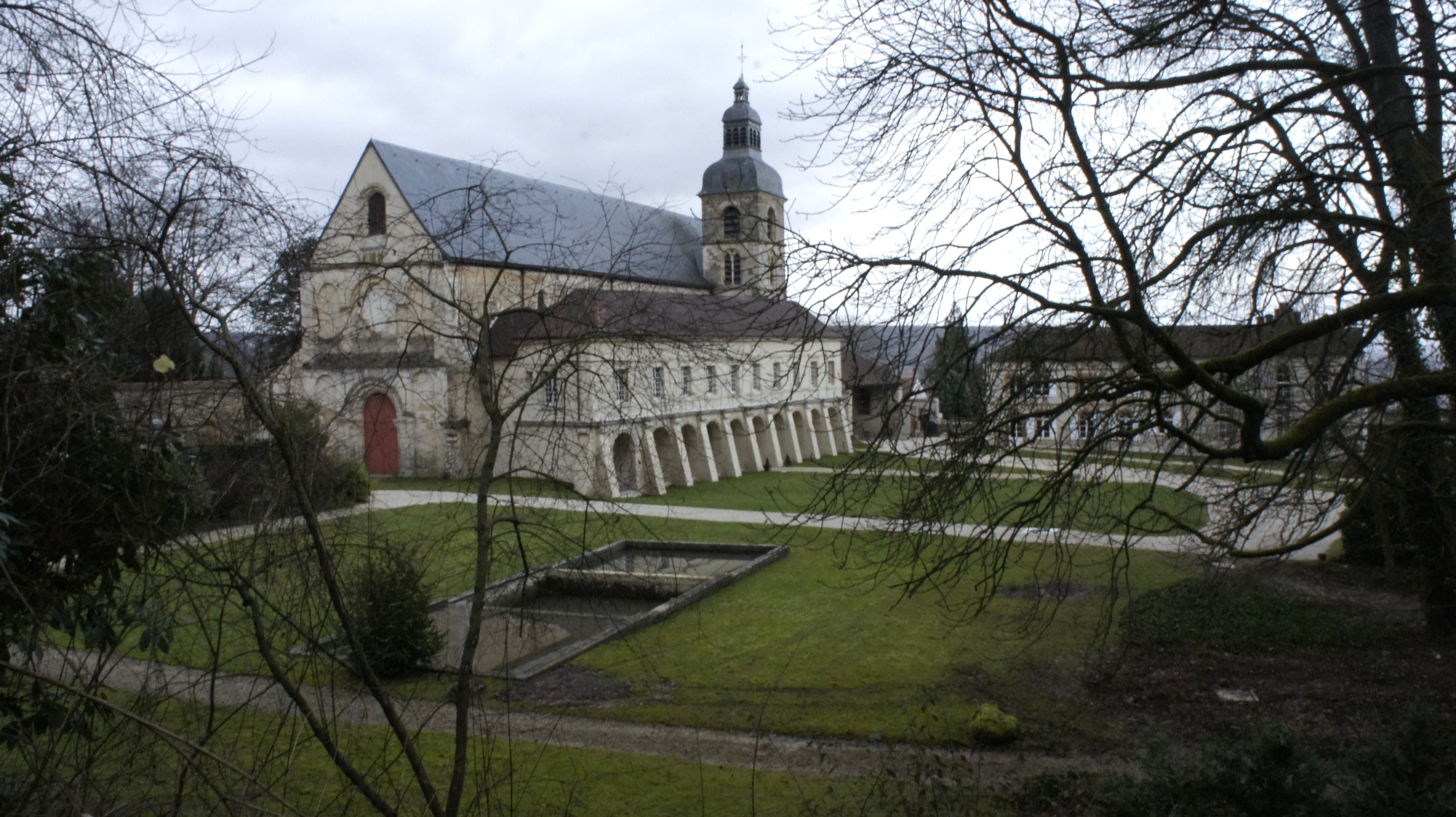
Abbey of Saint-Pierre

== See also ==
- Communes of the Marne department
- Montagne de Reims Regional Natural Park
