= Herbert (surname) =

Herbert is a surname, derived from the given name Herbert and may refer to:

== People ==
- A. P. Herbert (1890–1971), English humorist, novelist, playwright and law reform activist
- Adam Herbert (born 1943), former president of Indiana University and of the University of North Florida
- Alfred Herbert (1866–1957), former manufacturer of machine tools
- Amanda Herbert (born 1943), British cytopathologist and histopathologist
- Andrew Herbert (born 1954), British computer scientist
- Anne Herbert (disambiguation)
- Anthony Reed Herbert, English politician and lawyer, member of the British National Front
- Arthur Herbert (disambiguation)
- Auberon Herbert (disambiguation)
- Aubrey Herbert (1880–1923), British diplomat, traveller and intelligence officer
- Ben Herbert (born 1979), American football coach and former player
- Bob Herbert (born 1945), American journalist
- Brian Herbert (born 1947), Frank Herbert's son, author of The Dune Prequels
- Caleb Claiborne Herbert (1814–1867), Confederate congressman during the American Civil War
- Candie Herbert (born 1977), French footballer
- Charles Herbert (disambiguation)
- Christopher Herbert (born 1944), Anglican bishop
- Claude-Jacques Herbert (1700–1758), French economist
- Daniel Herbert (born 1974), Australian rugby union player
- Don Herbert (1917–2007), television's "Mr. Wizard"
- Edward Herbert (disambiguation)
- Elizabeth Herbert, Baroness Herbert (c. 1476–1507)
- Lady Evelyn Beauchamp (1901–1980), née Herbert, one of the first people in modern times to enter the tomb of Tutenkhamun
- Frank Herbert (1920–1986), American science-fiction novelist, author of Dune
- Frank Herbert (politician) (1931–2018), American politician and educator
- Gábor Herbert (born 1979), Hungarian handball player
- Gary Herbert (born 1947), American politician, 17th governor of Utah
- George Herbert (disambiguation)
- Giovany Herbert (born 2005), Panamanian footballer
- Gwyneth Herbert (born 1981), British singer-songwriter, composer, musician and record producer
- Hal Herbert (1922–2003), Canadian politician
- Heleen Herbert (born 1972), Dutch politician
- Henry Herbert (disambiguation)
- Herbert Herbert (1865–1942), British ophthalmologist and lieutenant-colonel
- Herbie Herbert (1948–2021), American music manager, singer-songwriter and musician
- Hilary A. Herbert (1834–1919), Secretary of the Navy under US President Grover Cleveland
- Jacob V. W. Herbert (1812–1899), American politician
- James Herbert (1943–2013), British writer of horror fiction
- James Herbert (director) (born 1938), American music video and short film director
- Jason Herbert (born 1967), British pop star turned manager
- Jean Herbert (1897–1980), French interpreter and orientalist
- John Herbert (disambiguation)
- Joseph W. Herbert (1863–1923), British-born American actor, singer and dramatist
- Justin Herbert (born 1998), American football player
- Khalil Herbert (born 1998), American football player
- Leila Herbert (1868–1897), American author
- Leon Herbert (born 1955), British actor
- Llewellyn Herbert (born 1977), South African hurdler
- Máire Herbert, Irish historian
- Mary Herbert (disambiguation)
- Matthew Herbert (born 1972), British electronic musician and music producer
- Mervyn Herbert (1882–1929), British diplomat and cricketer
- Nick Herbert (born 1963), British politician
- Nick Herbert (physicist) (born 1936), American physicist and author
- Patrick F. Herbert (1861–1925), American politician
- Paul M. Herbert (1889–1983), American politician
- Percy Herbert (disambiguation)
- Philemon T. Herbert (1825–1864), American politician and Confederate Army lieutenant colonel during American Civil War
- Philip Herbert (disambiguation)
- Pierre-Hugues Herbert (born 1991), French tennis player
- Ricki Herbert (born 1961), New Zealand footballer
- Robert Herbert (1831–1905), English-born Australian politician, first premier of Queensland
- Ron Herbert ((1933–2021), English rugby league player
- Sandra Herbert (born 1942), American historian of science
- Sidney Herbert (disambiguation)
- Thomas Herbert (disambiguation)
- Timothy Herbert (born 1941), British orthopaedic surgeon
- Timothy D. Herbert, American oceanographer and professor
- Tom Herbert (1888–1946), American character actor
- Twyla Herbert (1921–2009), American songwriter
- Ulrich Herbert (born 1951), German historian
- Victor Herbert (1859–1924), Irish-American composer and cellist
- Victor Herbert (hematologist) (1927–2002), American hematologist
- Xavier Herbert (1901–1984), Australian author
- Wally Herbert (1934–2007), British polar explorer, writer and artist
- Walter Herbert (disambiguation)
- William Herbert (disambiguation)
- Winifred Herbert (c. 1680–1749), Countess of Nithsdale
- Zbigniew Herbert, Polish poet, essayist and moralist

== Fictional characters ==
- John Herbert (Family Guy), in the animated television series Family Guy

== See also ==
- Justice Herbert (disambiguation)
- Herbert (disambiguation)
- Hébert (disambiguation)
- Herbart
