= Herb (disambiguation) =

A(n) herb is a plant used for flavoring or medicine.

Herb or Herbs may also refer to:

== People ==
- Herb (given name), a personal name, usually a short form of Herbert
- Herb (surname), a family name
- Jim Spanfeller, occasionally known as The Herb

== Arts, entertainment, and media ==
- Herb (film), a 2007 South Korean film
- Herbs (band), a New Zealand reggae group
- The Herbs, a television show

== Other uses ==
- Herbaceous plant, a plant that lacks a woody stem
- Herb (company), an American cannabis advocacy company
- Herb, a slang term for marijuana
- Herb, in Polish heraldry, a coat of arms
- Typhoon Herb, the strongest and the largest storm of 1996

== See also ==
- Herbert (disambiguation)
- Herbie (disambiguation)
