= Herb (given name) =

Herb is a given name, usually a diminutive of Herbert.

== People ==
=== Herbert ===
- Herb Aach (1923–1985), American painter and writer
- Herb Abramson (1916–1999), American music executive
- Herb Adderley (1939–2020), American football player
- Herb Alpert (born 1935), American musician
- Herb Andress (1935–2004), Austrian actor
- Herb Baumeister (1947–1996), American suspected serial killer
- Herb Boxer (born 1947), American ice-hockey player
- Herb Brooks (1937–2003), American ice hockey coach
- Herb Brown (born 1936), American basketball coach
- Herbert Boyer (born 1936), American biotechnologist, researcher and biotechnology entrepreneur
- Herb Caen (1916–1997), American journalist
- Herb Carneal (1923–2007), American sportscaster
- Herb Carnegie (1919–2012), Canadian ice hockey player
- Herb Chambers (born 1940), American billionaire businessman
- Herb Cohen (1932–2010), American music executive
- Herb Cohen (fencer) (born 1940), American 2x Olympic foil fencer
- Herb Coleman (disambiguation), multiple people
- Herb Conaway (born 1963), American politician
- Herb Covington (1902–1990), American football player
- Herb Crompton (1911–1963), American baseball player
- Herb Denenberg (1929–2010), American journalist, lawyer, and consumer advocate
- Herb Donaldson (lawyer) (1927–2008), American lawyer and judge
- Herb Drury (1896–1965), Canadian-American ice hockey player
- Herb Edelman (1933–1996), American actor
- Herb Elliott (born 1938), Australian runner
- Herb Ellis (1921–2010), American jazz guitarist
- Herb Emery, Canadian economist
- Herb Epp (1934–2013), Canadian politician
- Herb Fame (born 1942), one half of musical duo Peaches & Herb
- Herb Fitzgibbon (born 1942), American tennis player
- Herb Flam (1928–1980), American tennis player
- Herb Foster (1913–2003), Canadian ice hockey player
- Herb Franta (1905–1950), American football player
- Herb Gilbert (1888–1972), Australian rugby league and rugby union footballer
- Herb Gilbert Jr. (1917–1983), Australian rugby league footballer
- Herb Gray (1931–2014), Canadian politician and deputy prime minister
- Herb Gray (Canadian football) (1934–2011), American lineman in the Canadian Football League
- Herb Grosch (1918–2010), Canadian computer scientist
- Herb Jackson (baseball) (1883–1922), American baseball pitcher
- Herb Jeffries (1913–2014), American actor
- Herb Joesting (1905–1963), American football player and coach
- Herb Jordan (1884–1973), Canadian ice hockey player
- Herb Kawainui Kāne (1928–2011), American artist
- Herb Kaplow (1927–2013), American broadcast journalist
- Herb Kelleher (1931–2019), American businessman
- Herb Kent (1928–2016), American radio personality
- Herb Klein (disambiguation), multiple people
- Herb Kohl (born 1935), American politician
- Herb Lance (1925–2006), American singer-songwriter and record producer
- Herb Levinson (1929–2012), American actor
- Herb Lilburne (1908–1976), New Zealand rugby union and rugby league footballer
- Herb Louch (1875–1936), Australian rules footballer
- Herb Lubalin (1918–1981), American graphic designer
- Herb Magidson (1906–1986), American lyricist
- Herb Matthews Sr. (1894–1964), Australian rules footballer
- Herb Matthews Jr. (born 1943), Australian rules footballer
- Herb Nolan (1875–1933), Australian rules footballer
- Herb Olson (born 1951), American politician
- Herb Orvis (1946–2020), American football player
- Herb Pardes (born 1932), American psychiatrist
- Herb Pedersen (born 1944), American singer-songwriter and guitarist
- Herb Pennock (1894–1948), American baseball pitcher and executive
- Herb Peterson (1919–2008), American food scientist
- Herb Peyton (born 1932), American energy executive
- Herb Pfuhl (1928–2011), American educator and politician
- Herb Plews (1928–2014), American baseball player
- Herb Pomeroy (1930–2007), American jazz trumpeter
- Herb Raybourn (1935–2017), American baseball player and scout
- Herb Reed (1928–2012), American R&B singer
- Herb Rich (1928–2008), American football player
- Herb Ritts (1952–2002), American photographer
- Herb Rozell (born 1931), American politician
- Herb Score (1933–2008), American baseball pitcher and broadcaster
- Herb Sendek (born 1963), American basketball coach
- Herb Shriner (1918–1970), American humorist
- Herb Steinohrt (1899–1985), Australian rugby league footballer
- Herb Stempel (1926–2020), American game show contestant
- Herb Taylor (American football) (born 1984), American football player
- Herb Thomas (1923–2000), American racing driver
- Herb Thomas (outfielder) (1902–1991), American baseball player and manager
- Herb Trimpe (1939–2015), American comics artist
- Herb Voland (1918–1981), American actor
- Herb Wallerstein (1925–1985), American television producer and director
- Herb Washington (born 1951), American sprinter and baseball player
- Herb Waters (born 1992), American football player
- Herb Wiedoeft (1886–1928), German-born American bandleader
- Herb Wilkinson (1923–2026), American basketball player
- Herb Williams (born 1958), American basketball player and coach
- Herb Wright (1917–2015), American earth scientist

=== Other or indeterminate ===
- Herb Capozzi (1925–2011), Canadian athlete, businessman, sports team manager and politician
- Herb Dean (born 1970), American mixed martial arts referee
- Herb Miller (born 1997), American football player
- Herb Petras, Canadian general
- Herb Robertson (born 1951), jazz musician
- Herb Scharfman (1912–1998), American photographer
- Herb Wesson (born 1951), American politician
- Prince Herb, nickname given to Sal Vulcano for the ninth season of the television show Impractical Jokers

== Characters ==
- Herb (Ranma ½), in the manga series Ranma ½
- Herb Herbertson, a character in Nexo Knights
- Herb Melnick, from the television series Two and a Half Men
- Herb Tarlek, from the television series WKRP in Cincinnati
- Herb Copperbottom, from the film Robots
- Herb Kazzaz, from the animated series BoJack Horseman
- Herb, from a 1980s Burger King advertising campaign

== See also ==
- Herb (surname)
