= Nicolas Delamare =

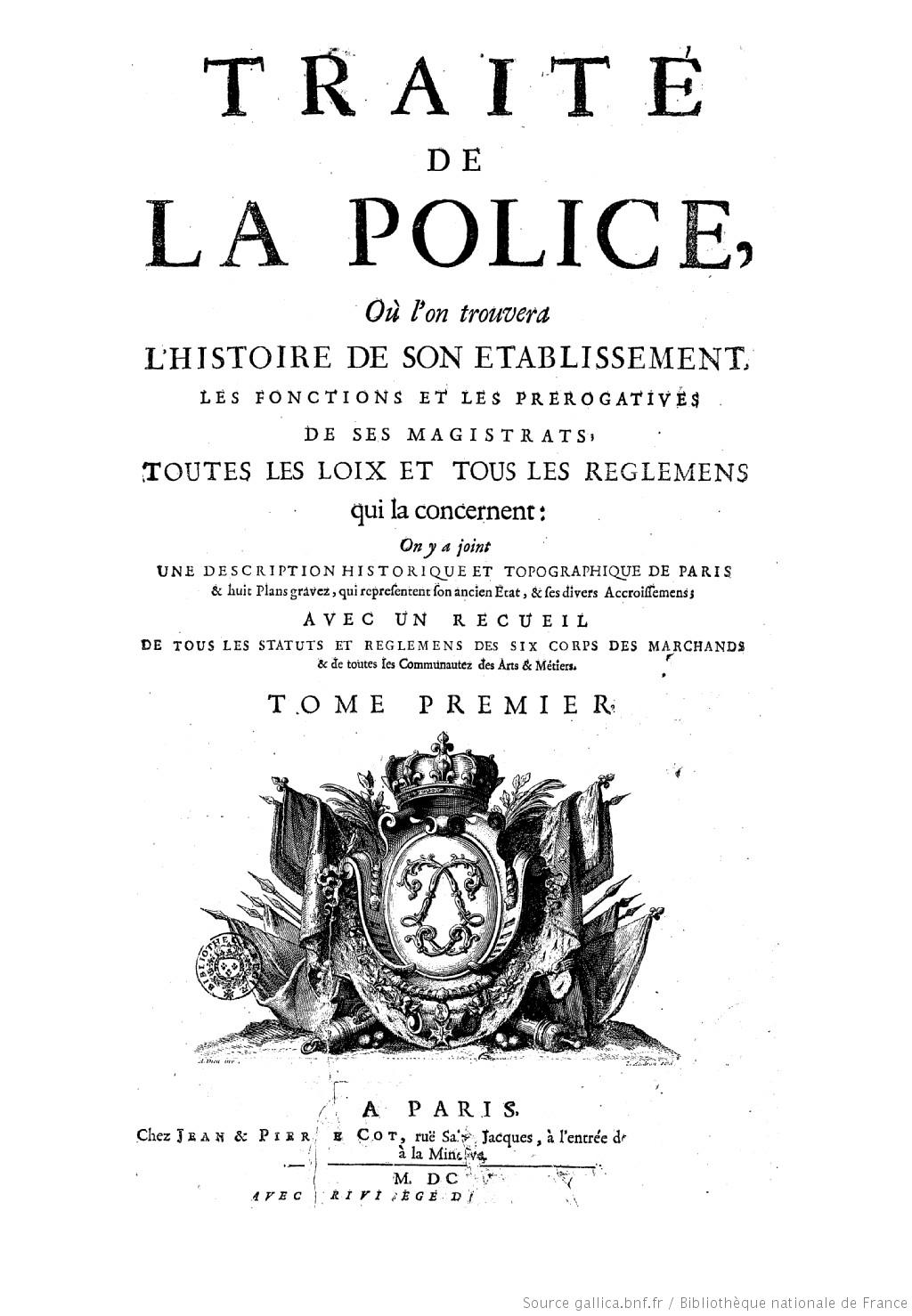
Title page of Le Traité de la Police

Nicolas Delamare (1639–1723) is the author of one of the seminal legal treatises of the early modern France, La Traité de la Police (Treatise on the Police). He was a commissar of the royal police in Paris during the reign of Louis XIV.

== Early life ==
He was born in Noisy-le-Grand near Paris in 1639. His father, Guillaume, was a notary. He studied law in a collège in Paris, and later settled in the city in 1664 and married Antoinette Saviner, a wealthy lady in 1670. He joined a commissarial office in 1673 and quickly rose through the administrative ranks and became close to Loius XIV. He investigated financial corruption in the construction of Versailles, and was later asked to manage popular unrests following dearth in 1693, 1699-1700 and 1709.

== La Traité de la Police ==
Delamare's oeuvre Traité de la Police, was published between 1705 and 1738 in four volumes, in over seven hundred folios decorated with intricate illustrations, maps and detailed annotations. The first volume dealt with the police in general, and also Religion, Morals and Health. The second and the third volumes dealt with provisions whereas as the fourth volume was devoted to the public highways.

He attempted an ambitious collation of French laws over the centuries, and then presented a set of principles drawn from these legislations. This was based on a grand survey of the roles and functions the Police had assumed over the years in regulating the social, political, religious and economic life of people during times of peace and conflict.

Delamare posited that police should aim at all details of their lives to make people happy and their lives peaceful. He earmarked twelve areas for intervention for this purpose: health, food, security, highway, commerce, manufacture, domestic affairs, science, education, religion, custom, and paupers. He argued that the sovereign authority was the source of order and happiness in a kingdom. He was of the view that pride, laziness, and self-love posed threats to orderliness and only a powerful authority can check such threats to public order. He stated:

"However just be the laws, the natural penchant of the human heart for liberty and independence would render them useless, if a powerful authority were not ceaselessly attentive to make them observed......The best and most useful of all laws, is that which prohibits one from informing oneself whether the laws are just or not, and which commands that they be rendered the same obedience as if they had been established by God himself"

Delamare's ideas are said to have been inspired by the precepts of the Roman Catholic church. Political government in his scheme of things was an intermediary between divinity and men. The ultimate aim of the laws is peace and public concord. He believed that social division is the greatest evil that can happen to a city. His principal aim, in his own words, was to ensure “the good order of the city & the preservation of the States”. Among other things, this shall be done through Police building and ensuring a social frame that promotes the emergence of good faith. Delamare also placed particular emphasis on police watching over production and circulation of wealth to prevent unfair commercial profits.

== Criticism ==
His methodology of doing a rigorous research through the Paris archives going through every ordinance, arrêt and regulation concerning the police and public order of the city from Antiquity up until his times (eighteenth-century) along with the conclusions he made soon brought Traité de la Police and Delamare much fame, though his prescriptions came in for much criticism later from thinkers such as Jacques Peuchet and Claude-Jacques Herbert. Such criticisms notwithstanding, his work has been considered as a major work to be included in the historical analysis of the evolution of police, Michael Foucault's writing on this being a good example for this.

His ideas also had a substantial influence on the formulation of the character of cities in early modern Europe as his work provided arguments in favour of an arrangement in which cities functioned both as the medium and the target of state power.
