= Pádraig Ó Riain =

Irish linguist

Pádraig Ó Riain is an Irish Celticist and prominent hagiologist focusing on Irish hagiography, martyrdom, mythology, onomastics and codicology.

Ó Riain has spent much of his academic life at the University College Cork, where he became a lecturer in 1964. Between 1973 and his retirement, he was professor of Old and Middle Irish. He has been a member of the Royal Irish Academy since 1989, president of the Irish Texts Society since 1992, and more recently, a member of the Placenames Commission of Ireland (An Coimisiún Logainmneacha). In the academic year 2000-01, he was Parnell Fellow at Magdalene College, Cambridge.

== Selected works ==
- Clár na Lámhscríbhinní Gaeilge sa Bhreatain Bhig. Dublin, 1968.
- Corpus Genealogiarum Sanctorum Hiberniae. Dublin, 1985. ISBN 0-901282-80-4.
- Beatha Bharra, Saint Finbarr of Cork: The Complete Life. Irish Texts Society 57. London. 1993. ISBN 1-870166-57-4.
- The Making of a Saint: Finbarr of Cork 600-1200. Irish Texts Society Subsidiary Series 5. London, 1997. ISBN 1-870166-84-1.
- (ed.) Irish Texts Society: The First Hundred Years. Irish Texts Society Subsidiary Series 9. London, 1998. ISBN 1-870166-88-4.
- (ed. with John Carey and Máire Herbert). Saints and Scholars: Studies in Irish Hagiography. Dublin, 2001. ISBN 1-85182-486-3.
- Four Irish Martyrologies: Drummond, Turin, Cashel, York. Woodbridge, 2002. ISBN 1-870252-19-5.
- (ed.) Beatha Aodha Ruaidh, the Life of Red Hugh O’Donnell: Historical and Literary Contexts. Irish Texts Society Subsidiary Series 12. London, 2002. ISBN 1-870166-91-4
- (ed. with Diarmuid Ó Murchadha and Kevin Murray). Historical Dictionary of Gaelic Placenames: Foclóir Stairiúil Áitainmneacha na Gaeilge, Fascicle 1, Names Beginning in A-. London, 2002. ISBN 1-870166-70-1.
- Feastdays of the Saints. A History of Irish Martyrologies. Subsidia Hagiographica, 86. Bruxelles: Société des Bollandistes. 2006. ISBN 978-2-87365-018-6.
- A Dictionary of Irish Saints. Four Courts Press. 2012. ISBN 978-1-84682-318-3

=== Festschrift ===
- John Carey, Máire Herbert and Kevin Murray (eds.), Cín Chille Cúile: Texts, Saints and Places. Essays in Honour of Pádraig Ó Riain. Celtic Studies Publications. Aberystwyth, 2004. ISBN 1-891271-13-X.
