= Jay Porter =

American baseball player (1933–2020)

J. W. Porter
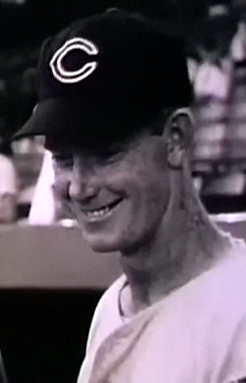
- Porter with Cleveland in 1958
- Catcher / Outfielder
- Born: January 17, 1933; Shawnee, Oklahoma, U.S.
- Died: October 11, 2020 (aged 87); Jupiter, Florida, U.S.
- Batted: Right Threw: Right

MLB debut
- July 30, 1952, for the St. Louis Browns

Last MLB appearance
- September 27, 1959, for the St. Louis Cardinals

MLB statistics
- Batting average: .228
- Home runs: 8
- Runs batted in: 62
- Stats at Baseball Reference

Teams
- St. Louis Browns (1952); Detroit Tigers (1955–1957); Cleveland Indians (1958); Washington Senators (1959); St. Louis Cardinals (1959)

J. W. "Jay" Porter (January 17, 1933 – October 11, 2020) was an American professional baseball player who appeared in the major leagues with five different teams between 1952 and 1959. Porter played in 229 major-league games: 91 as a catcher, 62 as an outfielder, 16 as a first baseman, and three as a third baseman, He had a career .228 batting average. He had his best season in 1957, when he hit .250 in 58 games while with the Detroit Tigers.

== Biography ==
Porter was born in Shawnee, Oklahoma, in 1933. According to his own testimony, the "J. W." of his name stands for "absolutely nothing."

Porter was signed as an 18-year-old in 1951. Bobby Mattick was scouting Porter when he noticed another prospect, Frank Robinson. Mattick wound up signing both Porter and Robinson, "with Porter signing for a much higher bonus." Porter received a large signing bonus, but was not subject to the bonus rule of the era, as the rule had been rescinded in December 1950.

Porter made his professional debut in 1951, playing in Class B in Waterloo, Iowa. He made his major-league debut the following season, but despite showing the early promise, played in only 33 games for the St. Louis Browns in 1952.

On December 4, 1952, Porter was traded by the Browns with Owen Friend and Bob Nieman to the Tigers for Virgil Trucks (who threw two no-hitters in 1952), Hal White, and Johnny Groth. Porter did not make it to the Tigers' big league team until 1955 and played only 92 games for the Tigers from 1955 to 1957.

Though he never became a starter in Detroit, he was selected by Sports Illustrated in October 2006 as one of the "10 Greatest Characters in Detroit Tigers History", along with Mark Fidrych, Norm Cash, Boots Poffenberger, and Herbie Redmond.

Porter's favorite meal was "two dozen (eggs) over light", which he would eat all at once. This became a "favorite meal" when his teammates encouraged him to compete against the world champion for eating the most eggs in one sitting, and Porter began his "training." A date was set for the contest, though the current world champion failed to arrive.

On February 18, 1958, the Tigers traded Porter to the Cleveland Indians with Hal Woodeshick for Jim Hegan and Hank Aguirre. Porter learned of the trade while driving to Spring Training in Florida, driving from his home in Oregon, down the West Coast, stopping in Tucson, Arizona to visit friends in the Indians training camp. Later on, when he was an hour outside Lakeland, Porter heard on the car radio that he had been traded to the Indians, made a U-turn, and headed back to Arizona. (Van Dusen, Ewald & Hawkins, "The Detroit Tigers Encyclopedia (Sports Publishing 2003), p. 94).

While playing for Cleveland, Porter had the task of catching Baseball Hall of Fame knuckleballer Hoyt Wilhelm. Reportedly, he was so baffled by Wilhelm's knuckleball that he used a first baseman's glove. As a catcher, Porter threw out a very respectable 41.2 percent of runners trying to steal, but he was never caught stealing.

After his playing career ended, he served as a minor league manager in the Montreal Expos organization, including a stint with the West Palm Beach Expos in 1970. He also managed the Expos' entry into the 1969 Florida Instructional League.

His initials, J.W., do not represent any actual given names; he is referred to by either "J.W." or "Jay."

He died on October 11, 2020, in Jupiter, Florida, from respiratory difficulties. At the time of his death, Porter was the youngest of the eight living former St. Louis Browns players.
