= Herbie (disambiguation) =

Herbie is a fictional sentient anthropomorphic 1963 Volkswagen Beetle.

Herbie may also refer to:

== Fiction ==
- Herbie (film), a 1966 short film by George Lucas
- Herbie (franchise), of films, television series, and multimedia
- H.E.R.B.I.E., a robot character in Marvel Comics

== Other uses ==
- Herbie (given name), a list of people and fictional characters with the given name or nickname
- "Herbie" (tree), an elm tree located in Yarmouth, Maine, US

== See also ==
- Herbert (disambiguation)
- Herb (disambiguation)
