= Herbert =

Herbert may refer to:

== People and fictional characters ==
- Herbert (given name), including a list of people and fictional characters
- Herbert (surname), including a list of people and a fictional character
- Herbert family, an Anglo-Welsh noble family
- Herbert (musician), a pseudonym of Matthew Herbert
- Baron Herbert (disambiguation), several titles in the British peerage

== Places ==
=== Antarctica ===
- Herbert Mountains, Coats Land
- Herbert Sound, Graham Land

=== Australia ===
- Herbert, Northern Territory, a rural locality
- Herbert, South Australia. former government town
- Division of Herbert, an electoral district in Queensland
- Herbert River, a river in Queensland
- County of Herbert, a cadastral unit in South Australia

=== Canada ===
- Herbert, Saskatchewan, Canada, a town
- Herbert Road, St. Albert, Canada

=== New Zealand ===
- Herbert, New Zealand, a town
- Herbertville, a small settlement in the North Island
- Mount Herbert (New Zealand)

=== United States ===
- Herbert, Illinois, an unincorporated community
- Herbert, Michigan, a former settlement
- Herbert Creek, a stream in South Dakota
- Herbert Island, Alaska

== Arts and entertainment ==
- Herbert (film), a Bengali film directed by Suman Mukhopadhyay
- Herbert (video game), a 1988 platform game
- Herbert (album), a 2022 album by Ab-Soul

== Other uses ==
- Herbert (grape), a hybrid grape variety
- Herbert Art Gallery and Museum
- USS Herbert, a destroyer

== See also ==
- Herberts (disambiguation)
- Herbet
- Herbie (disambiguation)
- Heriberto
- Hébert (disambiguation)
- Hubert
- 'Erbert, a fictional schoolboy from The Bash Street Kids comic strip
