= Sack of Balambangan Island =

Sulu pirate raid in British East Indian Company settlement

Sack of Balambangan Island (1775)
- Part of Anglo–Sulu relations, Piracy in the Sulu and Celebes Seas and Battle of Balambangan Island
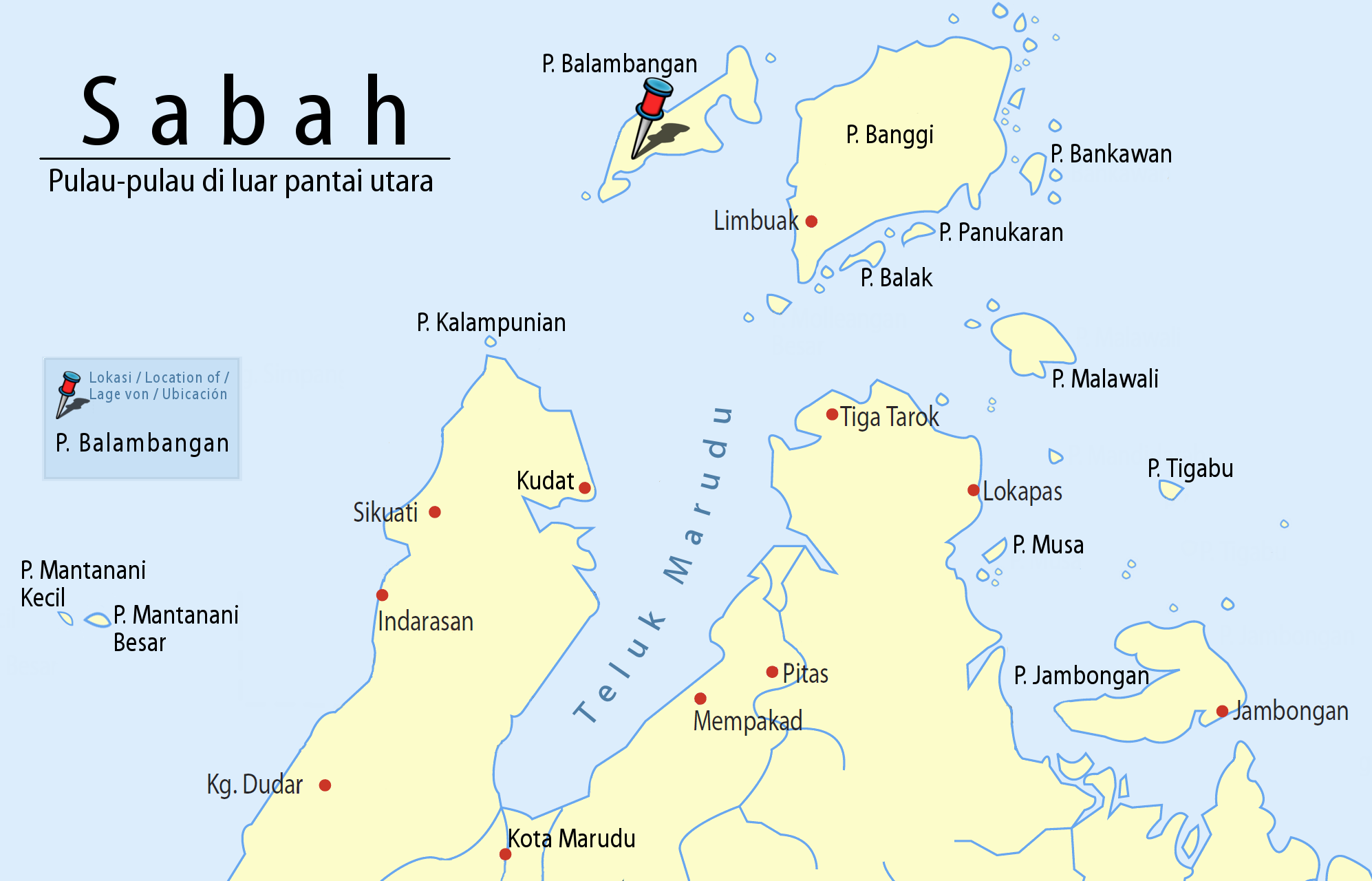
- Location and map of Balambangan Island between South China Sea and Sulu Sea
Date	26 February 1775
Location	Sabah, Balambangan Island
Result	Sulu victory: British East India Company settlements are entirely wiped out from Balambangan Island and suffers heavy losses; Captain John Herbert along with some remaining survivors flee to Labuan; End of British Presence in Sabah for the next quarter century

Belligerents
Sultanate of Sulu: Sulu-Moro pirates	British East India Company

Commanders and leaders
Datu Teteng	Capt. George Cowley; Capt. John Herbert (surrendered)

Strength
Hundreds	Approximately 100–200 defenders

Casualties and losses
Unknown	Heavy; Settlement destroyed

The Sack of Balambangan Island was a military assault launched by pirates and forces of the Sultanate of Sulu against British East India Company settlements on Balambangan Island on February 26, 1775, in retaliation for the public ridicule of the cousin of a Sulu Sultan, named "Datu Teteng" by Captain John Herbert, the captain in charge of the British settlement in Balambangan Island in a confrontation or dispute. The attack overwhelmed the British garrison, destroyed the settlement, killed or captured many of its defenders and settlers, and forced the British to abandon the island. The defeat temporarily ended Britain's first attempt to establish a permanent settlement on Balambangan.

== Background ==
Following agreements between the British East India Company and the Sultan of Sulu in 1773, the British established a trading settlement on Balambangan Island. The settlement was intended to become an important commercial base between India, China, and the Malay Archipelago.

Relations soon deteriorated because many Sulu nobles believed the British had failed to fulfill their obligations and had interfered with local commerce and politics. And that John Herbert had disrespected Datu Teting, the cousin of the ruler of Sulu, in a dispute.

== Battle ==
On 5 March 1775, a large force from the Sultanate of Sulu attacked the British settlement by surprise. Hundreds of Sulu attackers rapidly overran the defenses after fierce fighting.

Most of the fortifications were captured and destroyed. The settlements was entirely wiped out, razed and burned by the Sulu invaders. Many British soldiers and settlers were killed, while some survivors along with Captain John Herbert escaped aboard ships anchored offshore. settlers who had survived a disease were slain by the pirates while attempting to flee. The British East India Company subsequently abandoned Balambangan. The Sulu forces and pirates had also suffered casualties. But no estimate or figure was given.

== Aftermath ==
The raid was considered a victory for the Sulus over the English, and the destruction of Balambangan represented a major setback for British influence in Sabah for the next quarter century, and the loss of over £170,000. The British did not permanently reoccupy the island until several years later, after mounting a new expedition. Which was then abandoned due to heavy expenses

The attack demonstrated the military capability of the Sultanate of Sulu and its willingness to challenge European colonial settlements in the region.

After 1775, an endeavour was made to recover the immense losses of the raid, or re-establish a settlement in Balambangan Island. Under new circumstances, the Island was sought to be retaken as a military centre in the era of the Napoleonic Wars.

In October 1803, A migration to Balambangan was carried out by 8 large ships. The detachment consisted of 800 British officers and soldiers from a fortification in Malacca and many settlers, of whom were mostly artisan and laborers. Major Cales was appointed to be the commander of the troops, While sailing to the South China Sea, a heavy typhoon scattered the British fleet. And 2 of the largest cruisers, the "Thornhill" and the "Anstruther" had been sunk, 100 soldiers and seamen and the cargo were missing, while 400 had succeeded in saving their lives. Reaching the Island of Mangsee. On September 29th, the fleet had arrived and landed on the beach of Balambangan, before re-establishing the fortifications, due to the climate in the settlement, over 200 soldiers had constantly suffered diseases and were severely weakened

In Late November 1805, Due to heavy expenses in the re-established settlement, the entire garrison and settler population of 11,005 men were put on board of 7 ships, seeking to return to Penang and Bengal, settlers were described to have experienced 2 years of "hardship and suffering" during their stay at Balambangan. The settlement was then abandoned by the British, permanently ending the British presence in Balambangan.
