= Hāpeta =

Hāpeta or Hapeta is a Māori transliteration of the name Herbert. It may refer to:

- Hāpeta, hapū (sub tribe) within the Māori iwi (tribe) Ngāti Kahu ki Whangaroa
- Dean Hapeta, member of hip hop group Upper Hutt Posse
