= Herbie (given name) =

Herbie is a masculine given name, often a short form (hypocorism) of Herbert, and a nickname.

It may refer to:

== People ==
- Herbert Herbie Baxter (1883–1962), English cricketer
- Herbert Herbie Crichlow (born 1968), British music producer and songwriter
- Herbert Herbie Evans (1894–1982), Welsh footballer
- Herbie Faye (1899–1980), American actor and vaudeville comedian
- Herbie Fields (1919–1958), American jazz musician
- Herbert Flam (1928–1980), American tennis player
- Brian Herbie Flowers (born 1938), UK bass player and composer
- Hubert Herbie Goins (1939–2015), American rhythm & blues singer
- Herbert Herbie Hancock (born 1940), American jazz musician, bandleader, composer and actor
- Herbert Herbie Harper (1920–2012), American jazz trombonist
- Herbert Herbie Hewett (1864–1921), English amateur first-class cricketer
- Herbie Hide (born 1971 as Herbert Okechukwu Maduagwu), British former professional boxer
- Herbert Herbie Jones (1926–2001), American jazz trumpeter and arranger
- Herbert Herbie Kronowitz (1923–2012), American boxer and boxing referee
- Herbie Lewis (musician) (1941–2007), American hard bop double bassist
- Herbert Herbie Lewis (ice hockey) (1906–1991), Canadian National Hockey League player
- Herbie Lovelle (1924–2009), American drummer
- Herbie Mann (1930–2003), stage name of jazz flutist Herbert Jay Solomon
- Herbert Herbie Martin (1927–2014), Northern Ireland-born cricketer and rugby union player
- John Herbert Herbie Moran (1884–1954), American Major League Baseball player
- Herbert Herbie Nichols (1919–1963), American jazz pianist and composer
- Alfred G. Herbie Pennell (1921–2000), American polo player
- Herbert Herbie Phillips (1935–1995), American jazz trumpeter, big band composer and arranger
- Herbie Redmond (1929–1990), dancing groundskeeper of the Detroit Tigers Major League Baseball team
- Herbert Herbie Rich (1944–2004), American multi-instrumentalist
- Herbie Seneviratne (1925–1998), Sri Lankan Sinhala actor and filmmaker
- Herbie Smith (cricketer) (1914–1997), Australian cricketer
- Herbie Smith (footballer) (1895–1959), Australian rules footballer
- Herbert Herbie Steward (1926–2003), American jazz saxophonist
- Herbert Herbie Taylor (1889–1973), South African cricketer
- Herbert Herbie Tonkes (1921–1991), Australian rules footballer
- Herbert Herbie Williams, Jr. (born 1940), Welsh former footballer
- Herbie Wood (1920–2001), Australian rules footballer

== Fictional characters ==
- Herbie, an anthropomorphic Volkswagen Beetle car of Disney films and television
- Herbie (Numbuh 65.3), from the Cartoon Network animated series Codename: Kids Next Door
- H.E.R.B.I.E., a robot, part of the Fantastic Four
- Herbie Husker, mascot for the Nebraska Cornhuskers
- Herbie Popnecker, a comic book character
- Herbie, nickname of RB-34, a telepathic robot in Isaac Asimov's short story "Liar!"

== See also ==
- Herbert Blitzstein (1934–1997), American mobster known as "Fat Herbie"
