= Pierre Hébert =

French sculptor

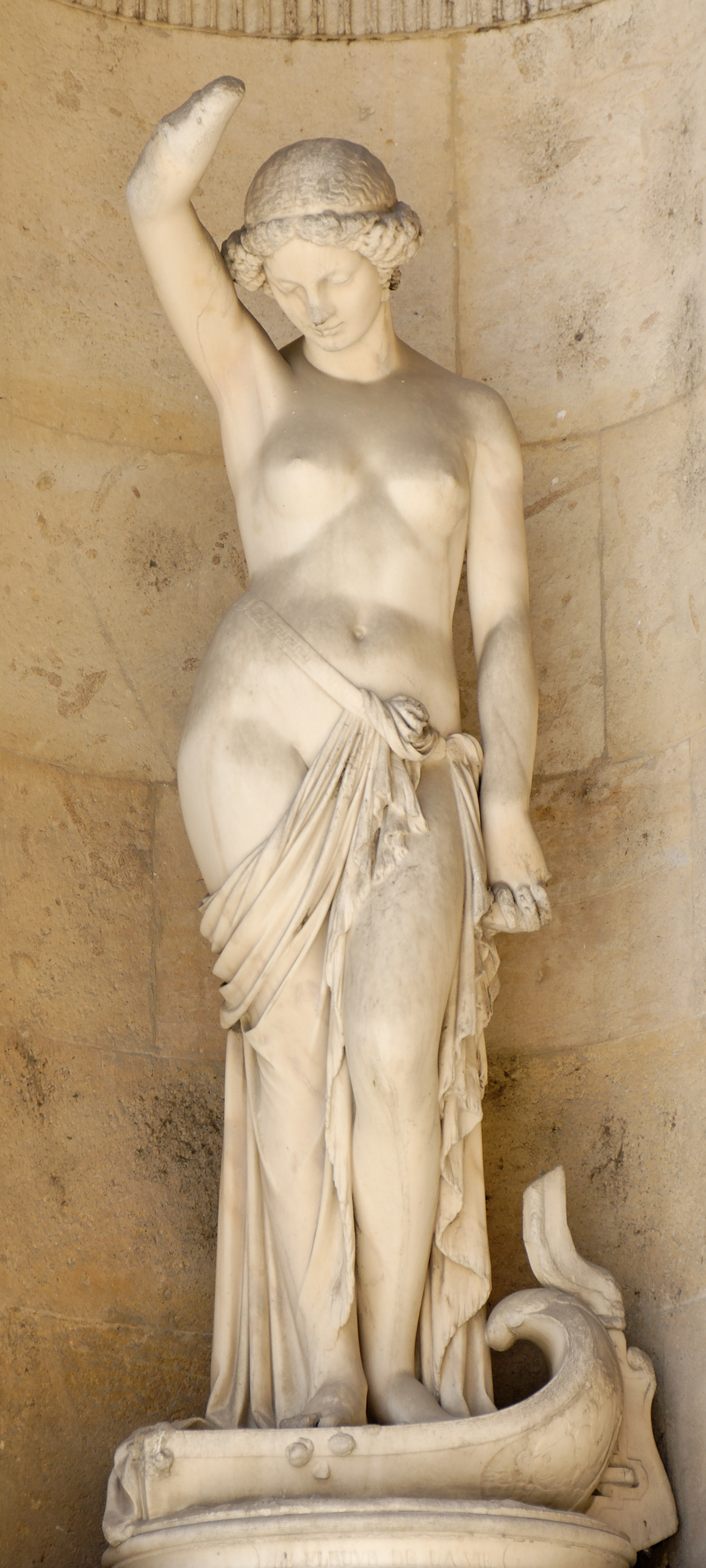
River of life (1855), sculpted decoration of the Cour Carrée in the Louvre

Pierre Hébert (Villabé, 1804 – Paris, 1869) was a French sculptor. His son, Pierre-Eugène-Emile Hébert (1828–1893) and his daughter Hélène Bertaux were also sculptors.

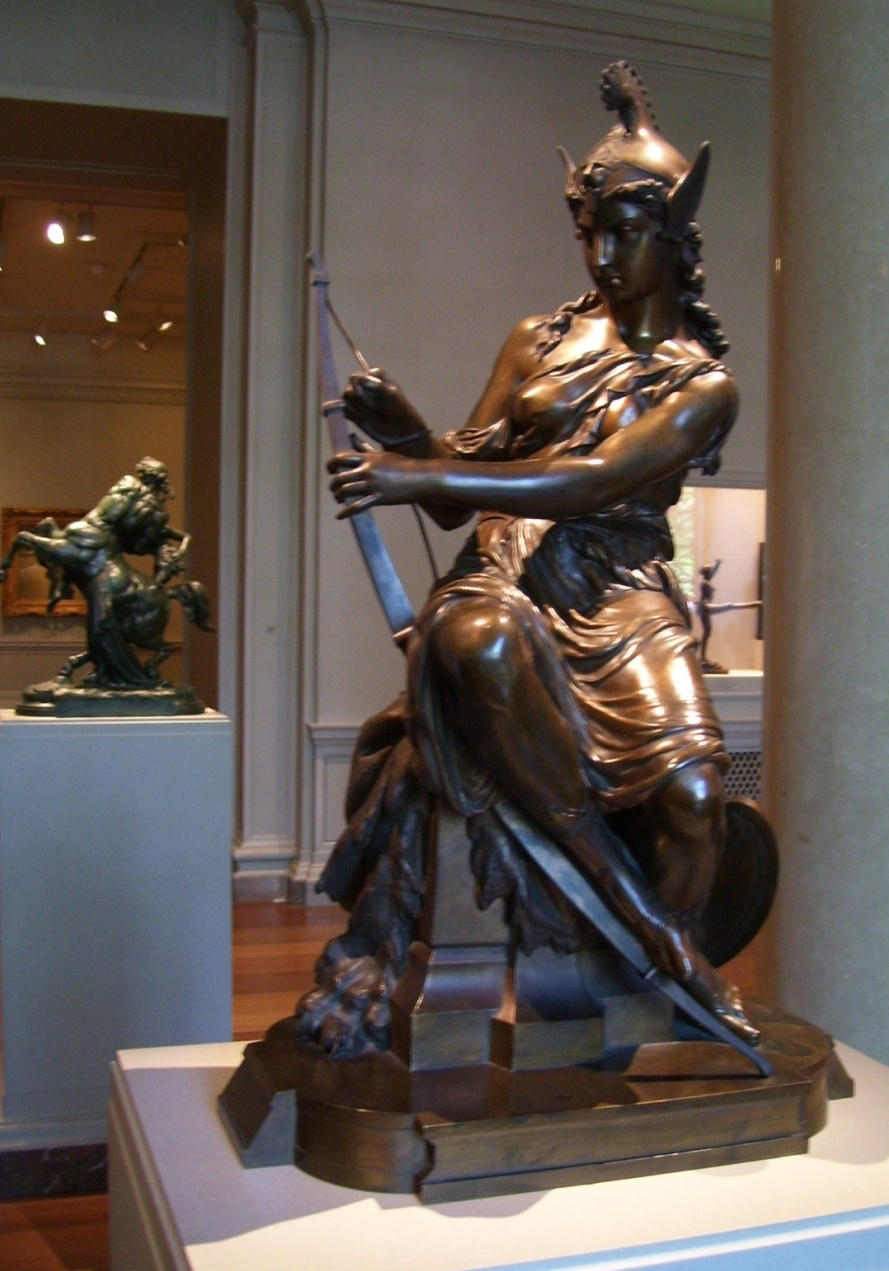
Amazon preparing for the battle (Queen Antiope or Armed Venus) (1860), National Gallery of Art, Washington DC

== Selected works ==
- Boy playing with a tortoise (Enfant jouant avec une tortue), 1849, Louvre
- River of life (Fleuve de la vie), 1855, West facade of the Cour Carrée in the Louvre
- St. Genevieve, ca. 1860–1865, facade of the church Saint-Étienne-du-Mont in Paris
- Marshal Ney, before 1869, façade of the Louvre facing the Rivoli Street
