= Mary Herbert =

Mary Herbert may refer to:

- Mary Herbert (born c. 1468), younger daughter of Mary Woodville
- Mary Sidney (later Mary Herbert, 1561–1621), writer and Countess of Pembroke
- Mary Herbert, Countess of Pembroke (died 1649) (c. 1580–1649), wife of William Herbert, 3rd Earl of Pembroke, daughter-in-law of the above
- Mary Herbert, Marchioness of Powis (died 1724), wife of William Herbert, 2nd Marquess of Powis
- Mary Herbert (businesswoman) (1686–1775), British-Spanish businessperson
- Mary Balfour Herbert (1817–1893), Irish painter
- Mary Eliza Herbert (1829–1872), Canadian publisher
- Mary Katherine Herbert (1903–1983), Irish-born SOE agent
- Mary Alice Herbert (born 1935), American candidate for vice president in 2004
- Mary H. Herbert (born 1957), American fantasy author

== See also ==
- Máire Herbert, Irish historian
