= Herberts =

Herberts may refer to:

== People ==
- Herberts Bērtulsons (1903–1942), Latvian alpine skier
- Herberts Cukurs (1900–1965), Latvian aviator and Nazi collaborator
- Herberts Kušķis (1913–1994), Latvian ice hockey goaltender
- Herberts Vasiļjevs (born 1976), Latvian retired ice hockey player
- Jimmy Herbert or Herberts (1897–1968), Canadian ice hockey player and referee

== Places ==
- Herberts, Antigua and Barbuda, a major settlement in Saint John
- Herberts, New Jersey, United States
- The Herberts, Wales, United Kingdom, a hamlet

== Businesses ==
- Alfred Herbert (company) or Herbert's, British former machine tool manufacturing business
- Herberts Gmbh, a German chemical company specializing in protective coatings, now Axalta

== See also ==
- Herbert (disambiguation)
