= Piracy in the Sulu and Celebes Seas =

Historical and modern piracy in maritime Southeast Asia

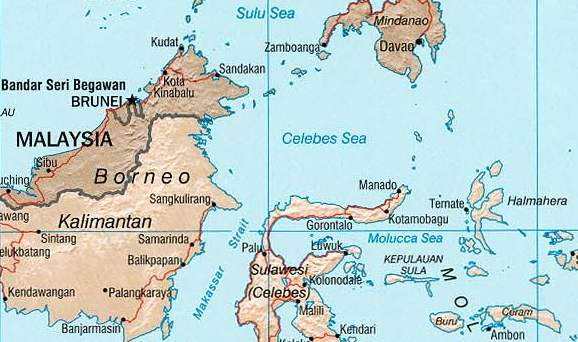
Sulu and Celebes Seas

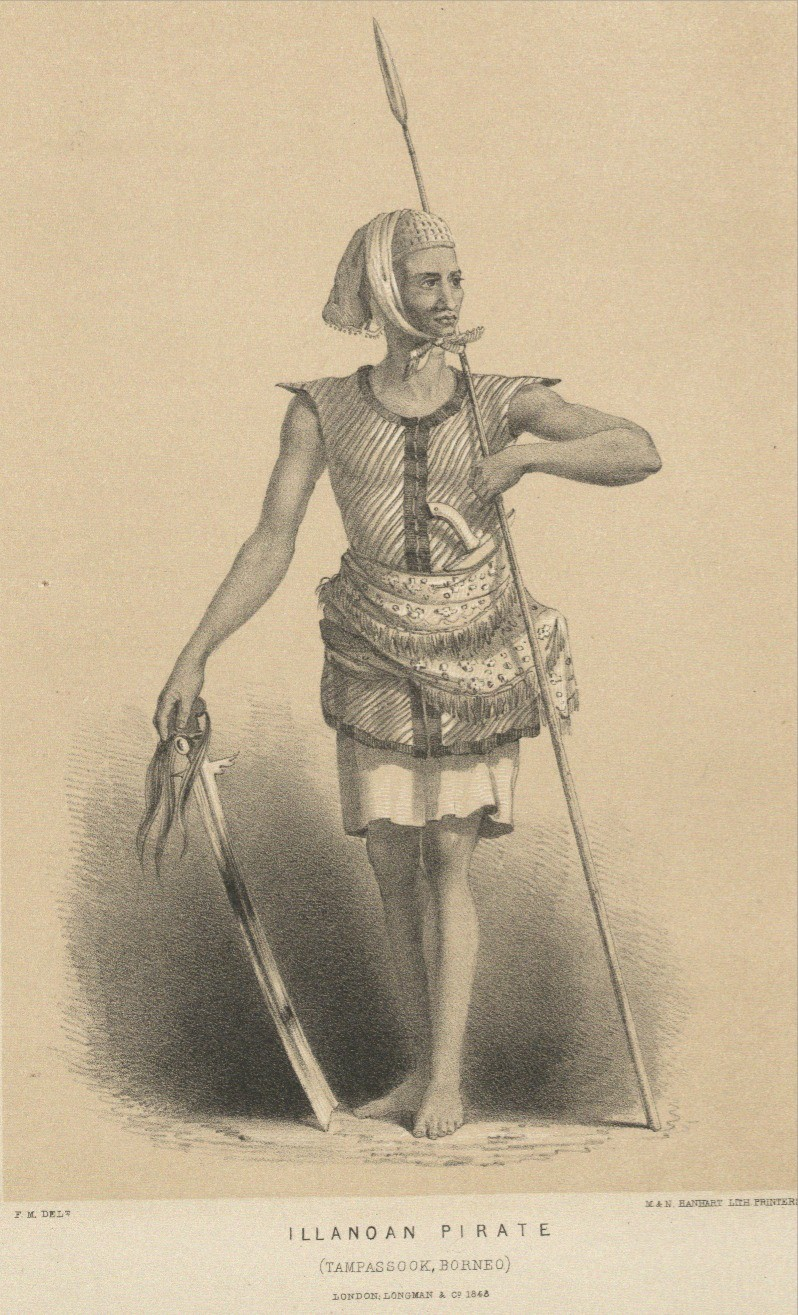
An Iranun pirate armed with a spear, a kampilan sword, and a kris dagger

The Sulu and Celebes Seas, which together form a semi-enclosed sea area and porous region covering about 1 million square kilometers, have been subject to illegal maritime activities since the pre-colonial era and continue to pose a maritime security threat to bordering nations. While piracy has long been a ubiquitous challenge historically interwoven with the region, recent incidents include other types of maritime crimes such as kidnapping and the trafficking of humans, arms, and drugs. Attacks are mostly classified as 'armed robbery against ships' under the United Nations Convention on the Law of the Sea, as they occur in maritime zones that lie under the sovereignty of a coastal state. Incidents in the Sulu and Celebes Seas specifically involve the abduction of crew members. Since March 2016, the Information Sharing Centre (ISC) of the Regional Cooperation Agreement on Combating Piracy and Armed Robbery against Ships in Asia (ReCAAP) has reported a total of 86 abductions, leading to the issuance of a warning for ships crossing the area.

== History of piracy in the region ==
Piracy in the Sulu and Celebes Seas has a long history of attacks and raids, with the region influenced primarily by raiders from the Sulu Sea who originated in the southern Philippines. The Sulu raiders were mostly composed of the Ilanun (or Iranun) and the Sama group of sea nomads, as well as the influential Tausug aristocrats from Jolo Island. Historically, piracy occurred near the island of Mindanao, where frequent acts of piracy were committed against the Spanish. These attacks by the local population are often known as the Spanish-Moro conflict. The term "Moro" originated in the Spanish description, as the Spanish introduced the derogatory term for Muslims and portrayed them negatively, primarily because of their opposition to Spanish colonial rule and Christianity. However, the term is being reclaimed by ethnic Filipinos today and constitutes a reclaiming of Muslim identity; consequently, the term is applied in this historical context.

Because of the continual wars between Spain and the Moro people, the areas in and around the Sulu Sea experienced recurring pirate attacks, which were not suppressed until the beginning of the 20th century. The pirates of that period should not be confused with the naval forces or privateers of the various Moro tribes. However, many of the pirates operated with government sanction during wartime.

=== The Moro Pirates and Spanish colonial occupation ===
Moro piracy is often linked to the Spanish colonial occupation of the Philippines. Over the course of two and a half centuries, Moro piratical attacks on Christian communities caused "an epoch of wholesale misery for the inhabitants". After the Spanish arrival in 1521, Moro piratical raids against Christian settlements started in June 1578. These spread throughout the archipelago and were conducted with impunity by organized fleets equipped with armaments nearly equal to those of the Spanish. The recurring acts are often described as a reaction against the Spaniards, who had displaced the Moros from the political and economic dominance they once enjoyed in the region (e.g., strategic commercial standpoints in Mindanao). Moreover, religious differences between Muslims and Christians are frequently cited.

Estimates of annual captives by the Moro muslim pirates ranged from 700 to 800 per year between the 1500s and 1600s (16th and 17th century) to Thousands between the 1700s and mid 1800s, with estimates going as high as 4,000 to 6,000 visayan captives around 1845.

In 1758, Bishop Manuel Matos wrote to the King of Spain that 12 towns in Camarines had been invaded and about 8,000 inhabitants killed by Moro pirates.

Between 1752 and 1757, Moro pirate attacks were so successful and persistent that many Visayan towns were depopulated by 50% through battles and enslavement.

The Moro raiders also raided coastal towns and villages in British North Borneo

It is estimated that from 1770 to 1870, around 200,000 to 300,000 people were enslaved by Moro muslim pirates, the victims were mostly Christian inhabitants of the Spanish Philippines.

These people were captured by piracy from passing ships as well as coastal raids on settlements as far as the Malacca Strait, Java, the southern coast of China, and the islands beyond the Makassar Strait. Most of the slaves were Tagalogs, Visayans, and "Malays" (including Bugis, Mandarese, Iban, and Makassar). There were also occasional European and Chinese captives who were usually ransomed through Tausug intermediaries of the Sulu Sultanate.

David P. Forsythe however, put the estimate much higher, at around 2 million enslaved people captured within the first two centuries of Spanish rule in the Philippines after 1565.

The Spanish along with their Filipino native allies also enslaved Moro Muslims, forced them to convert to Catholicism and sold them in slave markets, Francisco José de Ovando, Governer General of the Philippines in October 1751, approved Privaters to capture and enslave all Tausug men, women and children they could find and to destroy their property, As a reponse to Moro raids

On 13 May 1787, an Iranun-Moro force from Tempasuk, North Borneo, led by Rajah Ismail, alongside Bugis forces under Tuan Aji and with the support of Sultan Mahmud Riayat Shah of Johor-Riau, launched a surprise attack against the Dutch garrison at Riau. The raid was led followed by Sultan Mahmud's request for military assistance from Tempasuk to expel the Dutch from his territory. The attacking fleet consisted of approximately 90 vessels carrying 7,000 warriors, The assault resulted in heavy losses among the Dutch defenders. According to an accounts, numerous Dutch soldiers were killed during the fighting, while surviving personnel fled aboard their vessels towards Malacca, the Dutch garrison was expelled until their recapture by the end of the year.

In 1775, Iranun-Sulu pirates sacked and raided the Island of Balambangan, inhabited by British colonialists and settlers, many of the English Garrison and settlers were killed and the settlements were razed, the few remaining survivors fled. During the Napoleonic era, the English attempted to re-establish their settlements but lost 200 men on their way to Balambangan, it was then abandoned later after due to expensive costs, and more than 11,000 settlers, who were described to have suffered immensely, left Balambangan Island .

During the 1840s, the Spanish frequently engaged Moro pirates. The expedition to Balanguingui in 1848 was commanded by Brigadier José Ruiz, with a fleet of nineteen small warships and hundreds of Spanish Army troops. They were opposed by at least 1,000 Moros holed up in four forts equipped with 124 cannons and plenty of small arms. There were also dozens of proas at Balanguingui, but the pirates abandoned their ships for the better-defended fortifications. The Spanish stormed three of the positions by force and captured the remaining one after the pirates had retreated. Over 500 prisoners were freed in the operation, over 500 Moros were killed or wounded, and about 150 proas were lost. Twenty-two Spanish men were killed and around 210 wounded. The pirates later reoccupied the island in 1849. Another expedition was sent, which encountered only light resistance.

In the 1840s, James Brooke became the White Rajah of Sarawak and led a series of campaigns against the Moro pirates. In 1843, Brooke attacked the pirates of Malludu; in June 1847, he participated in a major battle with pirates at Balanini, where dozens of proas were captured or sunk. Brooke also fought in several more anti-piracy actions in 1849. During one engagement off Mukah with Illanun Sulus in 1862, former army captain Brooke sank four of the six proas engaged by ramming them with his small four-gun steamship Rainbow. Each pirate ship had over 100 crew members and enslaved people aboard the galley and was armed with three brass swivel guns. Brooke lost only a few men, while at least 100 pirates were killed or wounded. Several prisoners were also released.

The Moro raiders also caused extreme suffering for the inhabitants, A Spanish even claimed the raids were "written in blood and tears and nourished in pain and suffering"

Despite Spanish efforts to eradicate the pirate threat, piracy persisted until the early 1900s. Spain ceded the Philippines to the United States as a result of the Spanish–American War in 1898, after which American troops embarked on a pacification campaign from 1903 to 1913 that extended American rule to the southern Philippines and effectively suppressed piracy.

==== Ships ====
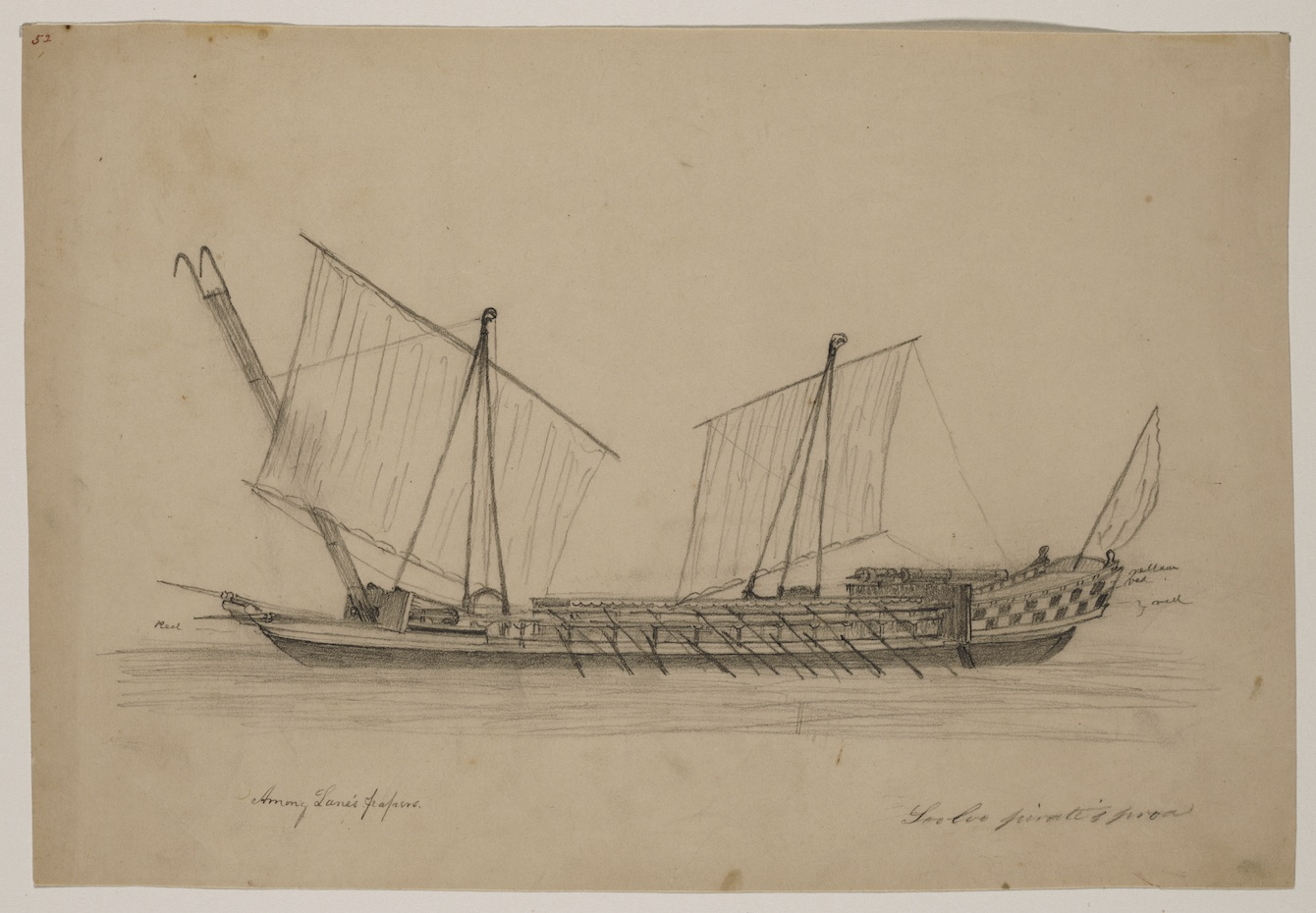
A lanong warship of Sulu pirates (c. 1850s), note the boarding platform at the front of the ship

The pirate ships used by the Moros include various designs like the paraw, pangayaw, garay, and lanong. The majority were wooden sailing galleys (lanong) about 90 feet long, with a beam of 20 feet (27.4 by 6.1 m). They carried around 50 to 100 crew members. Moros usually armed their vessels with three swivel guns, called lelahs or lantakas, and occasionally a heavy cannon. Proas were fast, allowing the pirates to prey on merchant ships that had been becalmed in shallow water while passing through the Sulu Sea. Slave trading and raiding were also very common; the pirates would assemble large fleets of proas and attack coastal towns. Hundreds of Christians were captured and imprisoned over the centuries; many were used as galley slaves aboard the pirate ships.

==== Weapons ====
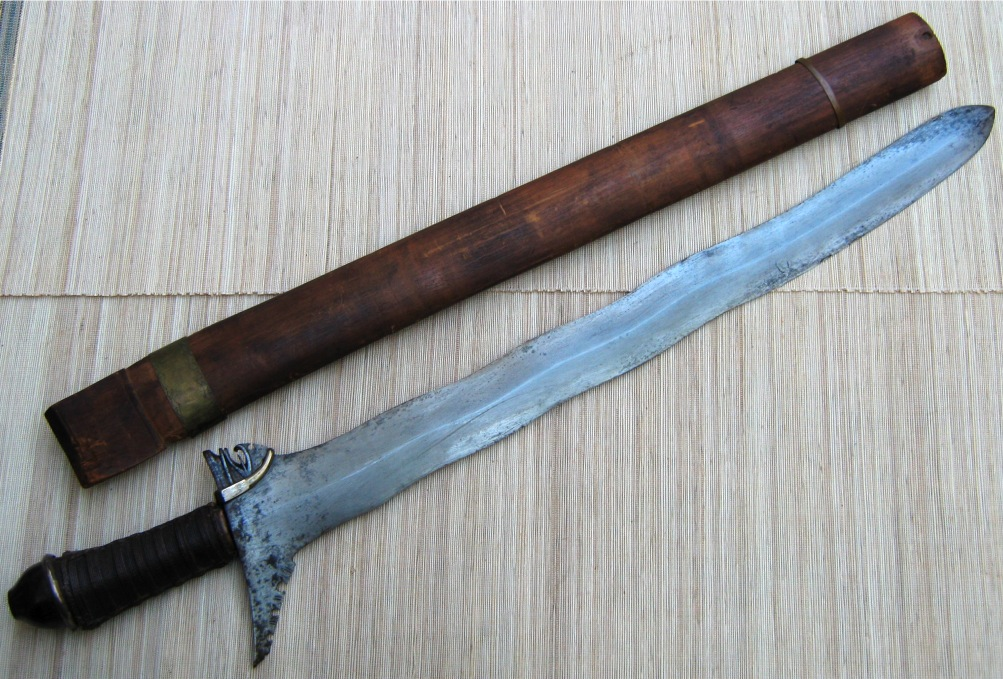
A Tausug kalis, a common Moro weapon in the Philippines

In addition to muskets and rifles, the Moro pirates, navy sailors, and privateers all used a sword called the kalis, with a wavy blade incised with blood channels (fullers). The wooden or ivory handle was often heavily ornamented with silver or gold. The type of wound inflicted by its blade makes it difficult to heal. The kalis was often used in boarding a vessel. Moros also used kampilans, another type of sword; a knife, or barong; and a budjak (spear) made of rattan and an iron spearhead. The Moros' swivel guns (lantaka) were unlike the more modern guns used by the world powers and were of much older technology, making them largely inaccurate, especially at sea. Lantaka dated back to the 16th century and were up to six feet long, requiring several men to lift one. They fired cannonballs weighing up to half a pound or grape shot. A lantaka was bored by hand, sunk into a pit, and packed with dirt to keep it vertical. The barrel was then bored by a group of men walking around in a circle to turn drill bits by hand.

=== Piracy after World War II ===
Piracy reemerged in the immediate post-WWII period due to deteriorating security conditions and the widespread availability of military-surplus engines and modern firearms. Police authorities of the newly independent Philippines were unable to curb the traffic in arms and goods (copra and cigarettes) by rebel groups, which was fueled by the motorization of inter-island transport. Emerging pirate groups mostly originated in the south of the country and were drawn from Muslim ethnic groups. In the northern parts of Borneo, the Tawi-Tawi pirates were of particular concern to the late British colonial authorities, who were said to be descendants of 19th-century Samal pirates. The authorities in North Borneo recorded 232 pirate attacks between 1959 and 1962. During this period, pirates primarily targeted barter traders engaged in the copra trade, but also attacked fishing and passenger vessels and conducted coastal raids on villages. For example, in 1985, pirates caused chaos in the town of Lahad Datu in Sabah, killing 21 people and injuring 11 others. The proliferation of arms, which increased with armed insurgencies in the following years, contributed to the level of violence and threat posed by pirates in the region. Philippine authorities at the time reported more than 431 deaths and 426 missing people over twelve years, resulting in an extremely high threat level for the region. Victims (local seafarers and Sea Nomads) were often ordered to jump into the water (a practice known as ambak pare, meaning "Jump, buddy!"), which explains the large number of people missing. The armed insurgencies of the Moro National Liberation Front (MNLF), founded in 1972, and the Moro Islamic Liberation Front (MILF), founded in 1977, provided a new impetus to piracy, with both organizations engaging in piracy to fund their armed struggle. MNLF has engaged in the extortion of fishermen, threatening to attack them if they did not pay protection money. Similarly, Abu Sayyaf, founded in the early 1990s, began engaging in pirate attacks, both to fund the organization and for personal financial gain.

== Contemporary piracy ==
=== 2000–2014 ===
Throughout the turn of the millennium, the threat of piracy remained high, with recurring attacks on small vessels and raids on towns and businesses in coastal villages in Sabah, mostly attributable to groups from the southern Philippines. At the time, the 2000 Sipadan kidnappings received a lot of international media attention, resulting in increased anti-piracy measures by the Malaysian government. Subsequently, the Malaysian government expanded its law enforcement agencies and established naval bases in Semporna, Sandakan, Lahad Datu, and Tawau. These efforts, combined with the signing of ReCAAP and an increase in the number of law enforcement personnel, showed some success and led to a decrease in incidents. Soon, on a global scale, piracy in Southeast Asian waters was outnumbered by Somali piracy.

However, in the years 2009–2014, an upswing in the number of attacks can again be attributed to Southeast Asia, mainly due to incidents in the Strait of Malacca and South China Sea. Raids on towns, settlements, and offshore businesses also reemerged as a security threat in the Sulu and Celebes area after 2010. In 2014, the Philippine government signed a peace deal with the MILF, which included details about the disarmament of its fighters. Yet, violence continues for other reasons, including attacks by other violent groups such as Abu Sayyaf and dissatisfied MILF members. In the Sulu Sea, attacks are mostly perpetrated by small teams of fewer than ten people, which are usually well-armed. Overall, incidents tend to be more violent than those in other areas of the world, with pirates often killing their victims by shooting them or forcing them to jump overboard and drown. Weapons used by pirates include handguns and rifles such as the AK47, M16, M1 Garand, and FN FAL. Pirates almost exclusively target small vessels, including fishing vessels, passenger ships, and transport vessels. While the pirates primarily aim to steal personal belongings, cargo, and fishers' catch, they also take hostages for ransom. There has been a rise in such incidents, especially in recent years. In addition, pirates sometimes take the vessel's outboard motors or the vessel itself, either to sell later or to keep for themselves.

Responses by affected nation-states in the region fall into three categories: maritime operations, information sharing, and capacity building. While the nation states have been historically reluctant to act collectively, upholding traditional ASEAN principles of non-interference and sovereignty, developments and outside pressure demanded action. Information sharing increased with the adoption of RECAAP in September 2006. Although Malaysia and Indonesia are not contracting parties, they still report incidents and share information.

=== 2014–2021 ===
Marked by a long history of piracy, Southeast Asia as a whole saw a sharp decline in piracy and armed robbery at sea in the years 2014–2018, with the number of incidents falling from 200 a year to 99 in 2017. However, this development is mainly due to increased efforts and enforcement mechanisms in the Straits of Malacca and cannot be transferred to the Sulu and Celebes region. Since 2016, the nature of piracy in that porous area changed with the militant extremist group Abu Sayyaf re-entering the field and engaging in kidnapping-for-ransom activities. The years 2016 and 2017 marked a peak, with 22 incidents and 58 abducted crew members reported throughout the first year. In the beginning, mostly fishing trawlers and tug boats were targeted. After October 2016, larger-tonnage ships were also targeted in the centre of the attacks. Until June 2019, ReCAAP reports 29 incidents of the abduction of crew members, documenting 10 people dead. In 2020, one incident (involving an attack on a fishing trawler on Jan 17 in Eastern Sabah) occurred, and no other incidents have been reported up to August 2021. Nonetheless, ReCAAP continues to warn of the risk of crew abduction and urges for a re-routing from the area of the Sulu and Celebes Seas.

==== Nature of piracy ====
Contemporary attacks in the Sulu and Celebes Seas amount primarily to kidnapping for ransom (while incidents in other parts of Southeast Asia mostly constitute non- violent robberies). All attacks have been committed while the ships were underway; tug and fishing boats were the main victims of abduction of crew (due to their slow speed and low freeboard). As the assaults are often traced back to members of Abu Sayyaf, the ransom money is most likely supporting the extremist organization. International attention arose due to the alarming cruelty inflicted on hostages who were abducted and detained.

==== State responses ====
Recent responses by the littoral states Malaysia, Indonesia, and the Philippines focus, first and foremost, on improving and expanding regional cooperation. Against the background of the kidnapping-for-ransom attacks in their territorial waters, the littoral states signed a Trilateral Cooperative Agreement (TCA) in July 2016 addressing the security challenge in the tri-border area. The TCA thereby lays the foundation of the maritime security coordination and encompasses regulations on extended intelligence sharing, joint border patrols and the operationalization of the Standard Operating Procedure for maritime patrols. Therefore, the three countries established so-called Maritime Command Centres in Tarankan, Tawau and Bonga, which serve as operation command and monitoring centres. Furthermore, drawing on efforts to combat piracy in Somalia, Malaysia and the Philippines established special transit corridors to ensure safe passage for commercial ships. These patrolled corridors serve as safety zones for vessels traversing the region. Notice must be given to one of the Command Centres 24 hours in advance to ensure adequate assistance. Moreover, in 2018, in collaboration with the United Nations Office on Drugs and Crime, the three countries established a Contact Group on Maritime Crime in the Sulu and Celebes Seas.

=== Factors and root causes ===
Despite efforts by Malaysian and Philippine authorities to curb piracy in the Sulu Sea, the problem persists. Weak maritime law enforcement, corruption, rivalries between the states involved, and unresolved territorial claims are major barriers to effectively suppressing piracy. Security forces are sometimes involved in organizing piratical activities, as well as supplying weapons and intelligence to pirates. The coastal geography of the Sulu Sea makes it easy for pirates to surprise victims and evade law enforcement. On land, the area's poor economic conditions drive people to resort to various forms of crime, including piracy, to make a living. Piracy, in turn, exacerbates the population's economic deprivation, as the primary targets are locals themselves.

The continued existence of groups like Abu Sayyaf and MILF is also to blame for the prevalence of piracy. Not only do these groups engage in piracy themselves, but security forces' efforts to suppress them have also diverted resources that could be used to combat piracy. These efforts may also drive the local population towards piracy, as security forces frequently harass farmers, depriving them of their livelihoods. The proliferation of small arms in the area is also high as a result of weak state authority and the armed struggle of these groups, making it easy for pirates to acquire weapons.

Cultural factors may also play a role, as most modern-day pirates in the Sulu Sea are descended from their historical predecessors, lending an element of cultural sanction to piracy. It has been suggested that piracy may, in part, be motivated by associated virtues such as honor and masculinity, which pirates can display through their operations. The population living at the edge of the Sulu Sea does not necessarily view piracy as an inherently criminal activity, as reflected in the local languages.

=== Piracy statistics ===
Piracy statistics on incidents in the region primarily rely on reports issued by the Piracy Reporting Centre of the International Maritime Bureau (IMB) and the Information Sharing Centre of ReCAAP. Data from the International Maritime Organization cannot be used, as it reports only from two locations: the Straits of Malacca and the South China Sea.

Overall, the numbers differ depending on each institution's reporting processes, the sources from which they derive their information, classification mechanisms, the locations of attacks, the types and status of ships attacked, and political considerations. The IMB, for example, relies on data from shipowners, whereas ReCAAP's ISC derives its data from official staff, naval and coast guard officers. Furthermore, underreporting and overreporting are additional sources of bias, as shipowners or local seafarers refuse to report incidents for different reasons. Shipmasters, for example, often fear disruptions to their schedules or a rise in insurance costs. Attacks on local craft, fishing boats, and small tugs are often not recorded due to a lack of infrastructure or trust in the authorities. Some incidents, by contrast, are reported without specific details about their location (whether the threat occurred at a harbour or at sea). Thus, piracy statistics require careful consideration of how the data are collected and the context surrounding the information.

== Gallery ==
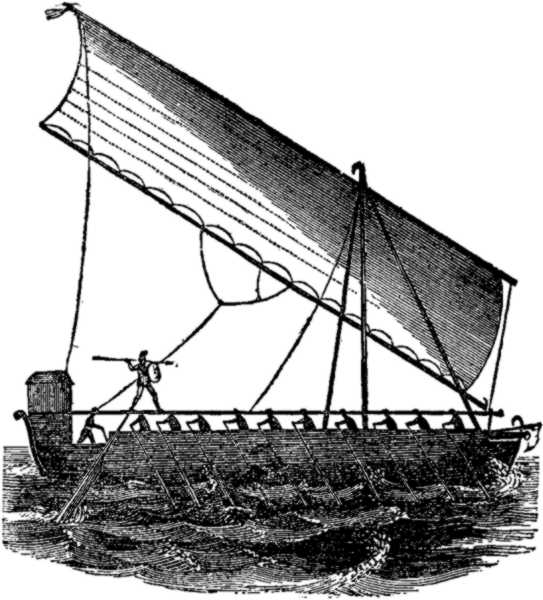
Piratical Proa in Full Chase

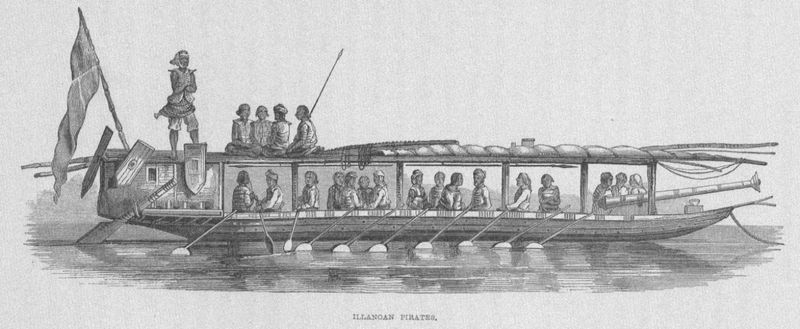
An Iranun garay armed with a lantaka at the bow

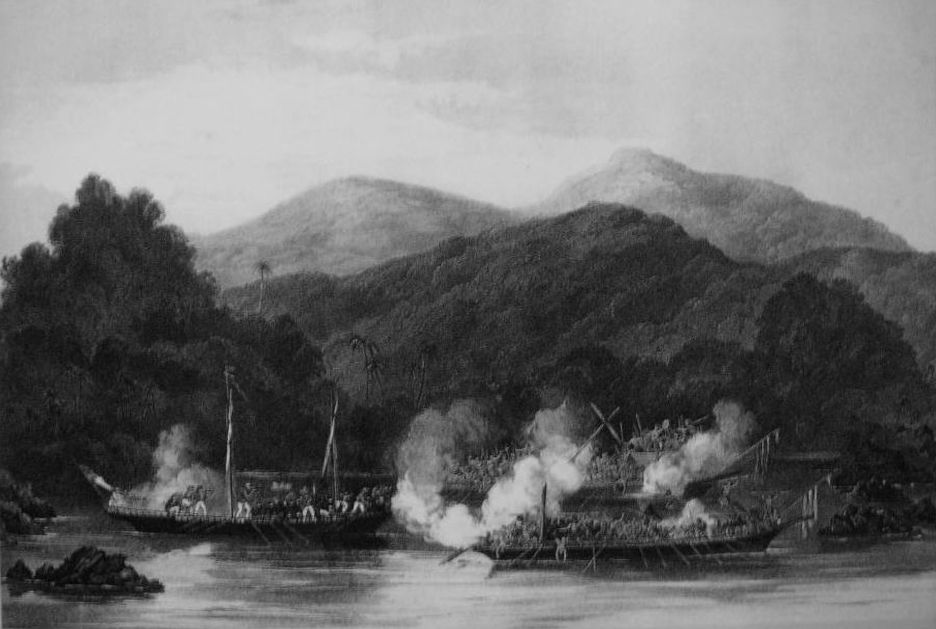
An engagement with pirates off Sarawak in 1843

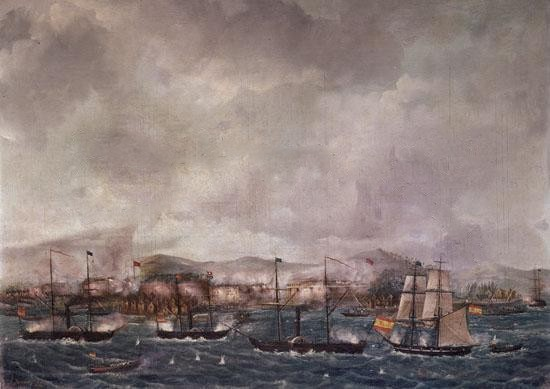
Spanish warships bombarding the Moro pirates of Balanguingui in 1848

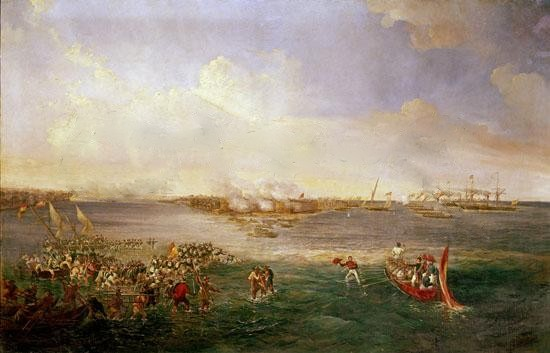
The Spanish landing at Balanguingui by Antonio Brugada

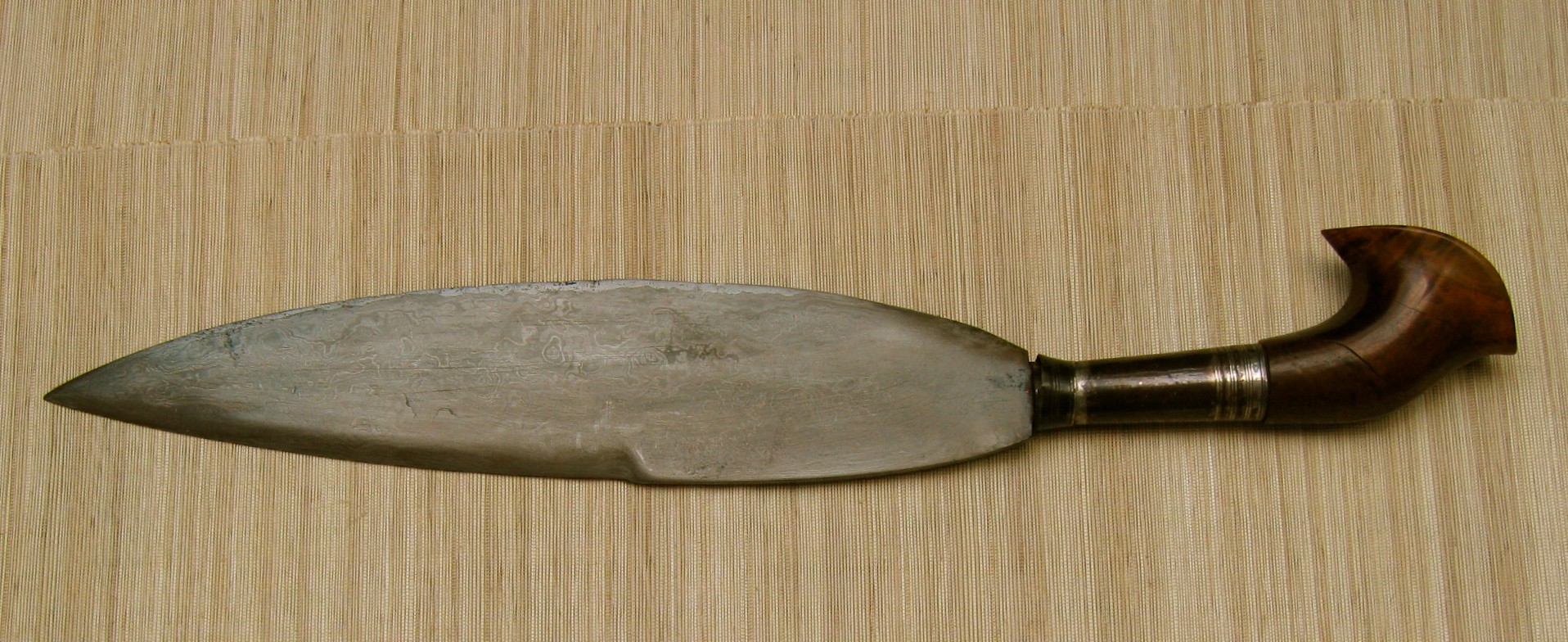
19th century barong from the Sulu Archipelago

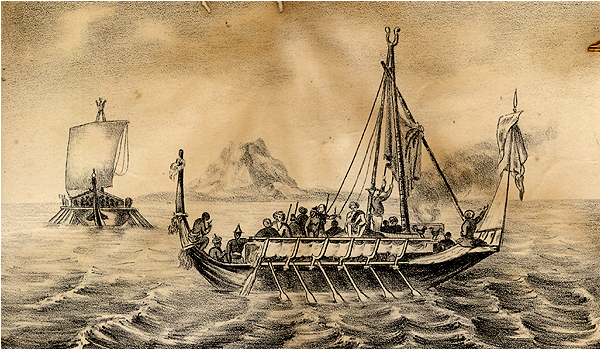
Garay warships in the Sulu Sea, c. 1850

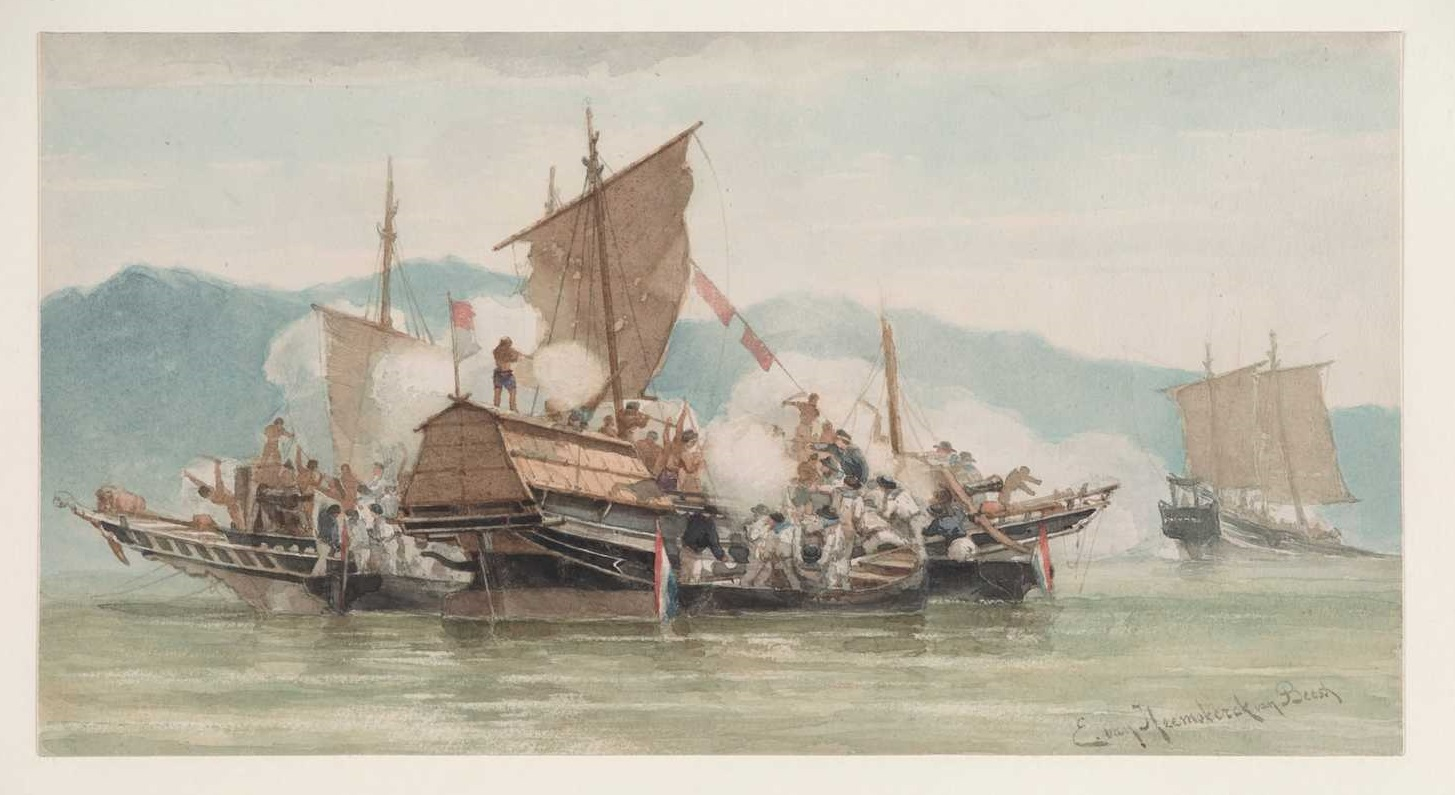
A fight between Filipino pirates, a Bugis trading ship, and Dutch mariners

== See also ==
- Piracy
- Piracy in the 21st century
- Slavery in the Sulu Sea
- Slavery in Brunei
- Slavery in Indonesia
- Slavery in Malaysia
- Timawa
- Marina Sutil
- Barbary Pirates
- Caribbean Pirates
- Spanish–Moro conflict
- Philippine–American War
- Cross border attacks in Sabah
- Thalassocracy
- Sandokan
