= William Herbert =

William Herbert may refer to:

== Earls of Pembroke ==
- William Herbert, 1st Earl of Pembroke (died 1469) (c. 1423–1469)
- William Herbert, 2nd Earl of Pembroke (1451–1491)
- William Herbert, 1st Earl of Pembroke (died 1570) (c. 1501–1570), Tudor period noble and courtier
- William Herbert, 3rd Earl of Pembroke (1580–1630)
- William Herbert, 6th Earl of Pembroke (c. 1640–1674), English nobleman and politician
- William Herbert, 18th Earl of Pembroke (born 1978)

== Other peers ==
- William Herbert, 1st Baron Powis (1572–1655), English peer and landowner
- William Herbert, 1st Marquess of Powis (1626–1696), English peer and landowner
- William Herbert, 2nd Marquess of Powis (1665–1745), English and later British peer and landowner
- William Herbert, 3rd Marquess of Powis (1698–1748), British peer and landowner

== Others ==
- William Herbert (MP fl.1555), MP for Monmouthshire 1555
- William Herbert (Captain), MP for Cardiff 1555
- Sir William Herbert (planter) (died 1593), Elizabethan planter in Ireland and MP for Monmouthshire 1584–1597
- William Herbert (died 1645), Welsh politician, MP for Cardiff 1621
- William Herbert (Royalist) (died 1642), Welsh politician, MP for Cardiff 1640
- William Herbert (died 1646) (1621–1646), English politician, MP for Monmouthshire 1640
- William Herbert (of Coldbrook) (died 1646), Welsh politician, MP for Monmouthshire 1626
- William Herbert (British Army officer, died 1757) (c. 1696–1757), general and member of parliament
- William Herbert (antiquarian) (1771–1851), English librarian and antiquary
- William Herbert (bibliographer) (1718–1795), editor of Typographical Antiquities by Joseph Ames
- William Herbert (botanist) (1778–1847), British botanist, poet, and clergyman
- William Herbert (British Army officer, born 1880) (1880–1949), British general
- William Herbert (mayor) (1743–1818), Irish American politician, banker, and mayor of Alexandria, Virginia
- Billy Herbert (1888–1928), English footballer

== See also ==
- Herbert (surname)
