= John Herbert =

John Herbert may refer to:

== Politicians ==
- John Herbert (c.1515-83 or later), MP for Much Wenlock 1553 and New Romney 1555
- John Herbert (secretary of state) (1550–1617), Welsh lawyer, diplomat and politician
- John Herbert (died 1659) (1625–1659), English politician
- John Carlyle Herbert (1775–1846), United States Representative from Maryland
- John Herbert (Conservative politician) (1895–1943), British Conservative Member of Parliament and Governor of Bengal
- John D. Herbert (1930–2017), Ohio Treasurer, 1963–1971
- John Herbert, 8th Earl of Powis (born 1952), British peer
- John Frederick Herbert (1868–1943), Australian politician
- John Herbert (Queensland politician) (1925–1978), Australian Liberal politician
- John Warne Herbert Sr. (1820-1898), American politician from New Jersey

== Sports ==
- John Herbert (athlete) (born 1962), British athlete and bobsledder
- Johnny Herbert (born 1964), English Formula 1 racer
- John Warne Herbert Jr. (1853-1934), American college football player in the first college football game
- John Herbert (rugby union), English international rugby union player

== Others ==
- John Herbert (actor) (1929–2011), Brazilian actor and film producer
- John Herbert (playwright) (1926–2001), author of Fortune and Men's Eyes
- John Maurice Herbert, contemporary of Charles Darwin at Cambridge University
- John Rogers Herbert (1810–1890), Victorian English painter
- John Herbert, Family Guy character who is the town's notorious pervert

== See also ==
- Herbert (surname)
