= Hébert =

Hébert or Hebert may refer to:

== People ==
=== Surname ===
- Anne Hébert, Canadian author and poet
- Ashley Hebert, subject of The Bachelorette (season 7)
- Bobby Hebert, National Football League player
- Chantal Hébert, Canadian political commentator
- Chris Hebert, American actor
- Corey Hébert, American celebrity physician and entrepreneur
- David Hebert, musicologist and musician
- Edmond Hébert, French geologist
- Ernest Hébert, French painter
- Felix Hebert, United States Senator from Rhode Island
- Felix Edward Hébert, member of the United States House of Representatives from Louisiana
- Gabriel Hebert (1866–1963), Anglican theologian
- Georges Hébert, French physical education practitioner, theorist and instructor
- Guy Hebert, National Hockey League player
- Jacques Hébert, French revolutionary
- Jacques Hébert (Canadian politician)
- Jay Hebert, American golfer
- Jean Hébert (born 1957), Canadian chess player and writer
- Jean-Pierre Hébert, American artist
- Kimberly Hébert Gregory (1972–2025), American actress
- Kyle Hebert, American voice actor
- Kyries Hebert, American football player
- L. Camille Hébert, American legal scholar
- Lionel Hebert, American golfer
- Louis Hébert, early Quebec farmer
- Louis Hébert (officer), Confederate soldier
- Louis-Charles-Auguste Hébert, French religious
- Louis-Philippe Hébert, Canadian sculptor
- Marie Marguerite Françoise Hébert, wife of Jacques Hébert
- Paul D.N. Hebert, Canadian biologist
- Paul M. Hebert, American judge at the Nuremberg Tribunals
- Paul Octave Hébert, governor of Louisiana
- Pierre-Eugène-Emile Hébert, French sculptor
- Sammy Hebert, Canadian hockey player
- T-Bob Hebert, American former college football player and media personality
- Thomas-Joachim Hébert, French marchand-mercier

=== Nickname ===
- Hebert (footballer, born 1991), Hebert Medeiros dos Santos, Brazilian football centre-back
- Hebert (footballer, born 2002), Hebert Pedro de Andrade Neto, Brazilian football defender for Nação

== Fictional characters ==
- Taylor Hebert, in the web serial Worm

== Places ==
Containing Hébert- or -hébert:

=== Canada ===
- Hébert Lake, a lake in Jamésie, Quebec
- Hébert River, in Jamésie, Quebec
- Hébertville, Quebec municipality, Saguenay–Lac-Saint-Jean

=== France ===
- Thuit-Hébert (Tui Herbert in 1216), French commune in Eure département, Normandy
- Le Petit-Hébert (Thuit Hebert in 1727), hamlet at Foulbec, Eure department
- Pont-Hébert (#Pons Heberti in 1260), French commune in Manche département, Normandy
- Saint-Martin-le-Hébert (#Beati Martini le Hebert in 1250), French commune in Manche
- Le Plessis-Hébert (Plaiseis Herbert in 1190), French commune in Eure
- Héberville (#Herbervilla in 1155), French commune in Seine-Maritime, Normandy
- Place Hébert, square in Paris

== See also ==
- Hebert Arboretum, Massachusetts
- Hebert Road, St. Albert, Alberta
- Paul M. Hebert Law Center, part of the Louisiana State University
- Herbert
