= Hélène Bertaux =

French sculptor and women's rights advocate

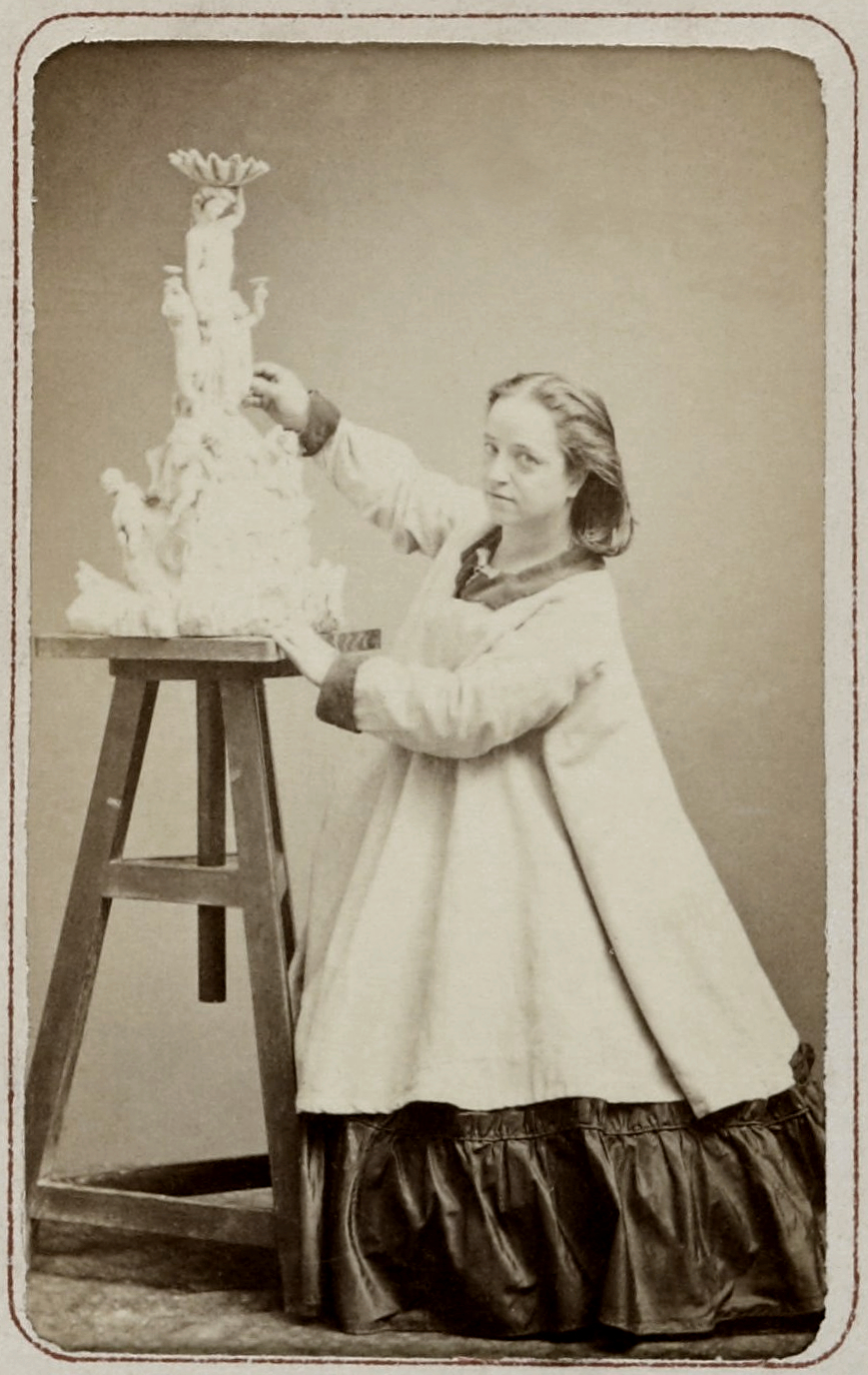
Hélène Bertaux (1864) Photograph by Étienne Carjat

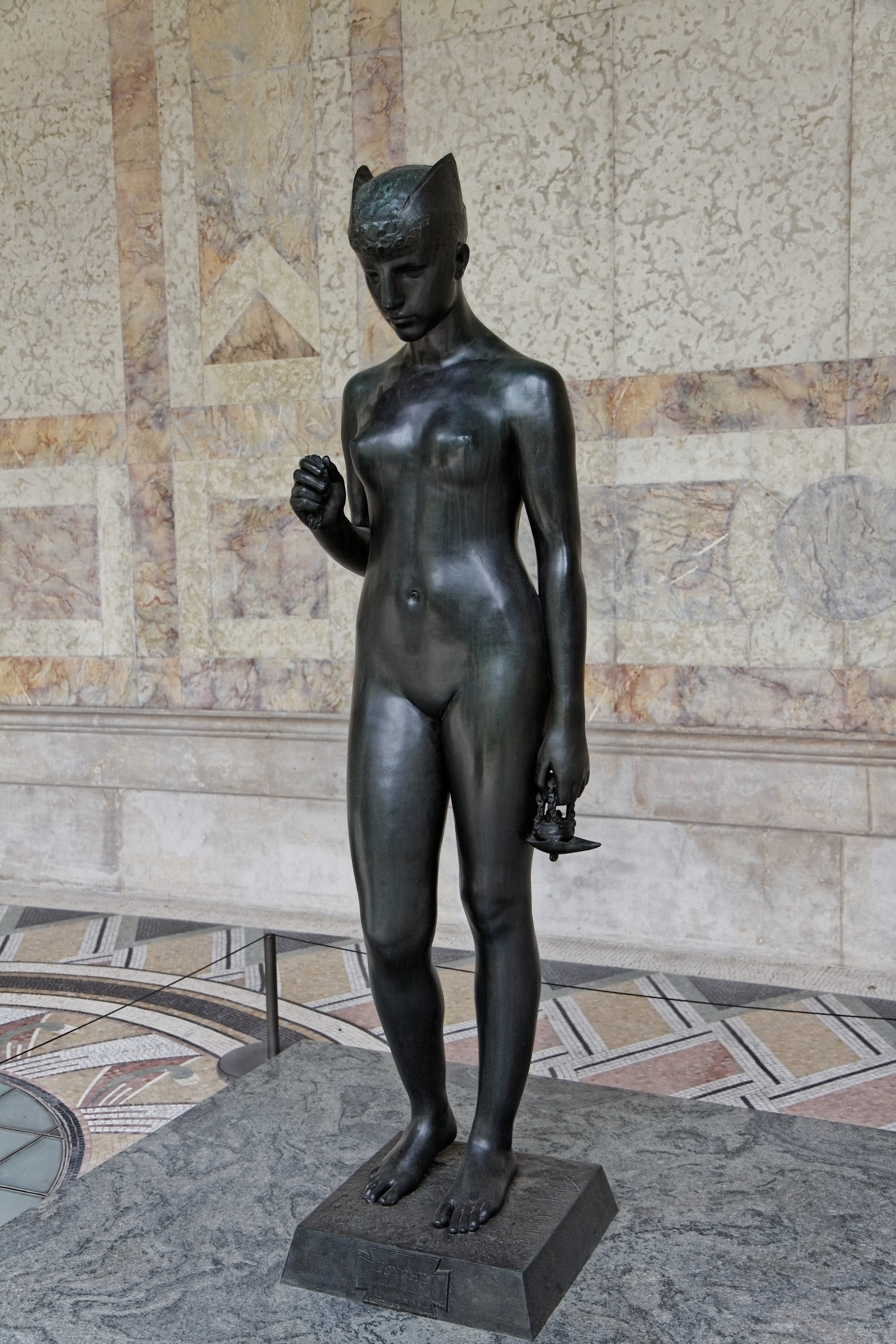
Psyché sous l'empire du mystère, now at the Petit Palais.

Hélène Bertaux (French pronunciation: [elɛn bɛʁto]), born Joséphine Charlotte Hélène Pilate (4 July 1825 – 20 April 1909) was a French sculptor and women's rights advocate.

== Early life and career ==
She was born in Paris and began her studies at the age of twelve with her mother's companion (and her father), the sculptor Pierre Hébert; she started her career by doing small pieces at his workshop, such as clocks, which were very popular at that time. She separated from her first husband and, in 1854, began signing her works "Madame Léon Bertaux", the name of her companion, whom she married after her husband's death in 1865.

With very few exceptions, such as Rosa Bonheur, women at that time were viewed as models or inspirations for art, but not as artists themselves. Although young women in bourgeois and upper-class families were frequently given drawing lessons, they were not admitted to the École des Beaux-arts and were considered incapable of producing truly worthwhile art. Given these difficulties, Bertaux decided to open a drawing and modelling workshop in 1873, and opened a sculpture school exclusively for women in 1880. The following year, she founded the "Union des femmes Peintres et Sculpteurs" and served as its first President until 1894.

She exhibited regularly at the Salon. Her first major recognition came in 1864, when she received a commission for a new pediment at the Tuileries. Later, in 1878, she did another pediment, for the Place du Carrousel. She received a gold medal at the Exposition Universelle (1889) for her statue of Psyche.

In 1894, she resigned her position at the Union, to devote herself full-time to gaining admission for women at the École. As a result of her efforts, the school accepted its first female student in 1897 and began admitting them on a regular basis by 1900. She continued to sculpt during this period, however, and was a candidate for the Prix de Rome in 1903.

She died, aged 83, in Saint-Michel-de-Chavaignes, at the Château de Lassay, a fifteenth-century castle she had purchased in 1897.

== Works ==
In the Dictionary of Women Artists, Tamar Garb used three works by Madame Léon Bertaux "to illustrate ... [her] work as a sculptor". The first highlighted work, Young Gallic Prisoner, features a male subject, which went against the accepted art world and societal etiquette. Female artists were generally forbidden from using male models due to societal norms about guarding "female modesty and male dignity". Bertaux's sculpture, Young Girl Bathing displays a more sensual scene. It shows a "pubescent woman" sitting on grass with a snail crawling up her back. The elements of this sculpture emphasize the woman's sexuality: "The invitation to touch here borders on an invitation to caress the body of the woman ..." The third work of art and Bertaux's most famous work, Psyché sous l'empire du mystère, is similar to Young Girl Bathing in that it features a standing sculpture of a nude woman "idealized, remote, and abstracted". These three pieces let Bertaux exemplify her sculpting ability, defy societal norms, and remain "true to her mission as a woman".
