= Henry Herbert =

Henry Herbert may refer to:

== British peers ==
- Henry Herbert (MP for Monmouthshire) (died 1598), MP for Monmouthshire
- Henry Herbert, 2nd Earl of Pembroke (1534–1601), Custos Rotulorum and Lord Lieutenant
- Henry Herbert, 9th Earl of Pembroke (1693–1749), English colonel, Groom of the Stole, Lord Lieutenant of Wiltshire 1733–1750
- Henry Herbert, 10th Earl of Pembroke (1734–1794), Lord of the Bedchamber, Governor of Portsmouth and Lord Lieutenant of Wiltshire 1756–1780 and 1782–1794
- Henry Herbert, 17th Earl of Pembroke (1939–2003), British aristocrat, film director and producer
- Henry Herbert, 1st Baron Herbert of Chirbury (1654–1709), English MP for Bewdley and for Worcester, Custos Rotulorum of Brecknockshire
- Henry Herbert, 2nd Baron Herbert of Chirbury (a. 1678–1738)
- Henry Herbert, 4th Baron Herbert of Chirbury (c. 1640–1691), English aristocrat, soldier and politician
- Henry Herbert, 1st Earl of Carnarvon (1741–1811), English MP for Wilton, Master of the Horse
- Henry Herbert, 2nd Earl of Carnarvon (1772–1833), his son, English MP for Cricklade
- Henry Herbert, 3rd Earl of Carnarvon (1800–1849), English MP for Wootton Bassett
- Henry Herbert, 4th Earl of Carnarvon (1831–1890), Secretary of State for the Colonies and Lord Lieutenant of Ireland
- Henry Herbert, 6th Earl of Carnarvon (1898–1987), British peer
- Henry Herbert, 7th Earl of Carnarvon (1924–2001), English peer and racing manager
- Henry Herbert, 1st Earl of Powis (1703–1772)

== Other people ==
- Henry Herbert (Master of the Revels) (1595–1673), to Charles I and Charles II of England
- Henry Herbert a.k.a. Master Herbert, English child actor
- Henry Herbert (actor) (died 1947), English stage actor and producer, better known in the U.S.
- Henry Arthur Herbert (1756–1821), Anglo-Irish landowner and Irish MP for Kerry and Tralee, British MP for East Grinstead
- Henry Arthur Herbert (1815–1866), grandson of the above, Anglo-Irish landowner and Chief Secretary for Ireland, British MP for Kerry 1847–1866
- Henry Arthur Herbert (1840–1901), son of the above, Anglo-Irish landowner and British MP for Kerry 1866–1880
- Henry William Herbert (1807–1858), novelist and sports writer
- Henry Herbert (cricketer) (1863–1884), English cricketer
- Henry Herbert (Parliamentarian) (1617–?), Welsh politician who sat in the House of Commons of England
- Henry Lloyd Herbert, chairman of the United States Polo Association in 1890

== See also ==
- Harry Herbert (1934–2011), Australian rules footballer
