= Edward Herbert =

Edward Herbert may refer to:

- Edward Herbert (died 1593), MP for Montgomeryshire
- Edward Herbert (died 1595), MP for Old Sarum
- Edward Herbert, 1st Baron Herbert of Cherbury (1583–1648), Anglo-Welsh soldier, diplomat, historian, poet and religious philosopher
- Edward Herbert (attorney-general) (c. 1591–1658), member of the Parliament of England under Kings James I and Charles I
- Edward Herbert, 3rd Baron Herbert of Chirbury (died 1678), English aristocrat and soldier
- Edward Herbert (of the Grange), judge and MP for Monmouthshire, 1656
- Edward Herbert (judge) (c. 1648–1698), English judge who served as Chief Justice of the King's Bench; MP for Ludlow
- Edward Herbert, 2nd Earl of Powis (1785–1848), British peer and Tory politician; MP for Ludlow
- Edward Charles Hugh Herbert (1802–1852), British MP for Callington, 1831–1832
- Edward Herbert, 3rd Earl of Powis (1818–1891), British peer and politician; MP for Shropshire North
- Edward Herbert, 5th Earl of Powis (1889–1974)
- Edward Herbert (priest) (1767–1814), archdeacon of Aghadoe
- Edward Herbert (Irish politician) (1727–1770)
- Neddie Herbert (1907–1949), American criminal
