= Herbet =

Herbet is a surname. Notable people with the surname include:

- Nikolaus Herbet (1889–?), German Nazi SS concentration camp commandant
- Yves Herbet (1945–2024), French footballer and manager

== See also ==
- Herbert (surname)
