= Herbert screw =

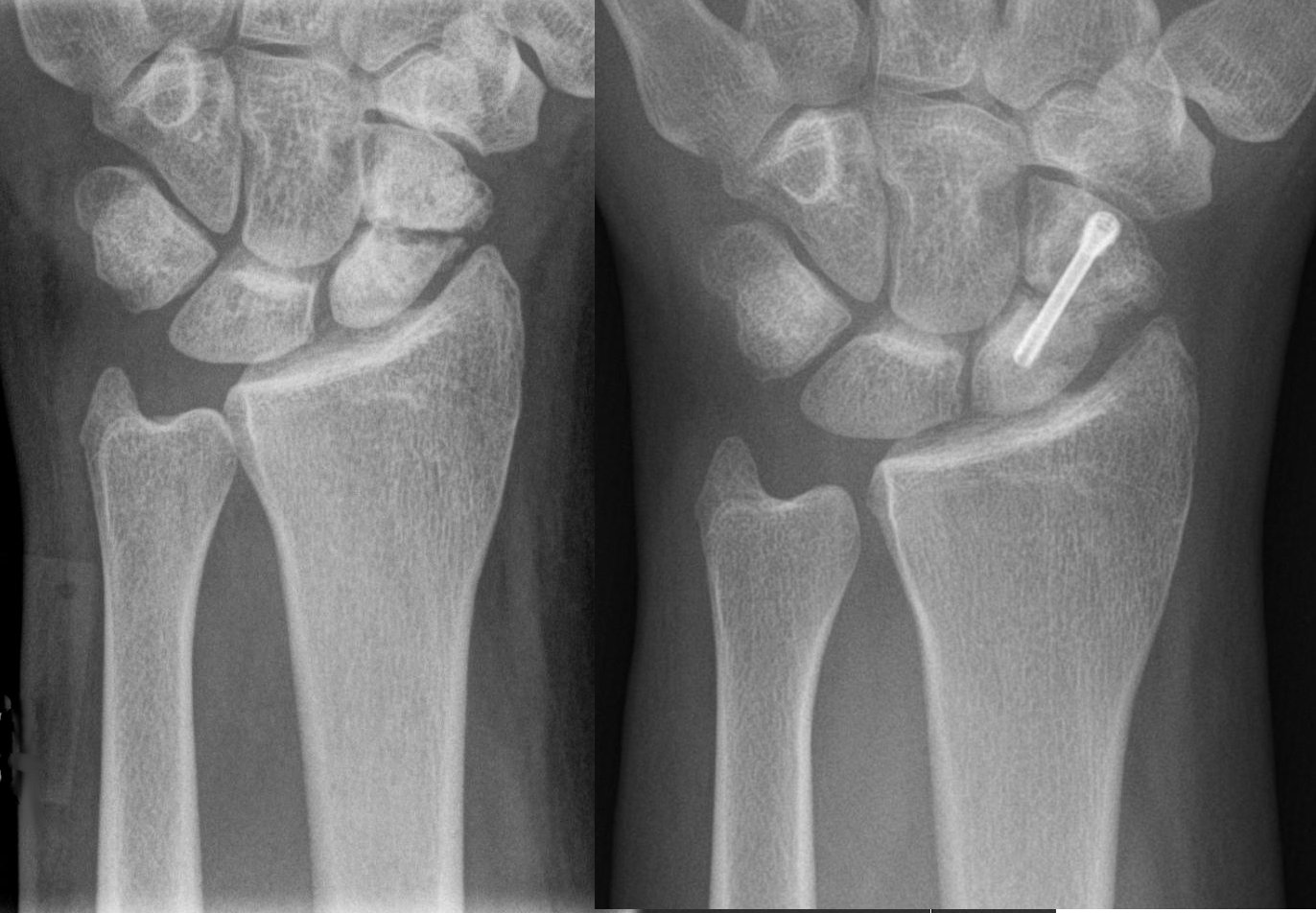
Scaphoid pseudarthrosis, before and after treatment with Herbert screw.

The Herbert screw is a variable pitch headless cannulated surgical screw. Typically made from titanium for its biocompatible properties, it is one of the earliest designs of headless compression screw, which achieve interfragmentary compression through differential pitch between the threads at each end.

Invented by Timothy Herbert, it became generally available in 1978, and is used to fix fractures of the scaphoid of the hand, capitulum of the humerus and radial head of the arm. Other uses include metatarsal breaks, osteochondritis dissecans, and small joint arthrodesis.
