= Herb Nolan =

Australian rules footballer

Personal information
- Full name: Herbert Pierce Nolan
- Born: 21 November 1875; Wyndham Vale, Victoria
- Died: 21 December 1933 (aged 58); Malvern East, Victoria

Playing career^{1}
Years	Club	Games (Goals)
1897–99	Fitzroy	4 (0)
- ^{1} Playing statistics correct to the end of 1899.

Herbert Pierce Nolan (21 November 1875 – 21 December 1933) was an Australian rules footballer who played with Fitzroy in the Victorian Football League (VFL).
