= Patrick F. Herbert =

Patrick F. Herbert (July 8, 1861 – March 2, 1925) was an American businessman, carpenter, and politician.

Herbert was born in St. Anthony, Minnesota and went to the Minneapolis public schools. He was involved with the lumber business in Minneapolis and worked for the Itasca Lumber Company. Herbert served in the Minnesota House of Representatives in 1901 and 1902 and in 1905 and 1906. He was a Democrat. Herbert died in Minneapolis, Minnesota.
