= Justice Herbert =

Justice Herbert may refer to:

- Charles Edward Herbert (1860–1929), judge of the Central Court of Papua and an acting judge of the Supreme Court of the Northern Territory
- Edward Herbert (judge) (c. 1648– 1698), chief justice of the King's Bench in the United Kingdom
- Paul M. Herbert (1889–1983), associate justice of the Supreme Court of Ohio
- Thomas J. Herbert (1894–1974), associate justice of the Supreme Court of Ohio
- Thomas M. Herbert (1927–2014), associate justice of the Supreme Court of Ohio
- William Herbert, 2nd Earl of Pembroke (1451–1491), chief justice of South Wales
