= John Herbert (rugby union) =

England international rugby union player

- Full name: Alfred John Herbert
- Born: 1 January 1933 (age 93) Stroud, England
- School: Marling School
- University: University of Cambridge

Rugby union career
- Position: Wing-forward
International career
Years	Team	Apps	(Points)
1958–59	England	6	(0)

Alfred John Herbert (born 1 January 1933) is an English former international rugby union player.

Herbert was educated at Marling School and the University of Cambridge.

A three-time Cambridge blue, Herbert captained the university in the 1956 Varsity Match and also served as captain of London club Wasps. He played in the wing-forward position for England in their 1958 and 1959 Five Nations campaigns, gaining a total of six caps. His career was subsequently impacted by persistent knee injuries.

== See also ==
- List of England national rugby union players
