= Philip Herbert =

Philip Herbert may refer to:

- Philip Herbert, 4th Earl of Pembroke (1584–1649), English courtier and politician
- Philip Herbert, 5th Earl of Pembroke (1621–1669)
- Philip Herbert, 7th Earl of Pembroke (1652/53–1683), English nobleman
- Philip Herbert (died 1716) (c. 1665–1716), Member of Parliament for Rye
- Philip Herbert (died 1749) (c. 1716–1749), Member of Parliament for Oxford, 1740–1749
- Philip Herbert (actor) (born 1957), English actor and mime artist
- Philip Herbert (composer) British composer, see Chineke! Orchestra
