= Henry Herbert (cricketer) =

English cricketer

Henry Moore Bungay Herbert (22 January 1863 – 30 November 1884) was an English first-class cricketer active 1883 who played for Middlesex. He was born in Southwark; died in St Pancras, London.
