= Anne Herbert =

Anne Herbert may refer to:

- Anne Herbert (writer) (born 1952)
- Anne Herbert, Countess of Pembroke (c.1514–1552), née Anne Parr, sister to Henry VIII's sixth wife, Katherine Parr
- Lady Anne Clifford (1590–1676), married name Anne Herbert
