= Auberon Herbert (disambiguation) =

Auberon Herbert (1838–1906), English philosopher and politician, a son of 3rd Earl of Carnarvon.

Auberon Herbert may also refer to:

- Auberon Herbert, 9th Baron Lucas (1876–1916), politician and fighter pilot, a grandson of 3rd Earl of Carnarvon.
- Auberon Herbert (landowner) (1922–1974), advocate of Eastern European causes after World War II, a grandson of 4th Earl of Carnarvon.
