= Herb (surname) =

Herb is a surname. Notable people with the surname include:

- Charles A. Herb (1844–1895), American politician and businessman
- Jon Herb (born 1970), American race car driver
- Michael Herb (born 1966), American political scientist
- Raymond Herb (1908–1996), American nuclear physicist

== See also ==
- Herb (given name)
