= Walter Herbert =

Walter Herbert may refer to:

- Wally Herbert (1934–2007), British polar explorer
- Walter Herbert (conductor) (1898–1975), American conductor, impresario and bridge player
- Walter Herbert (manager) (1948–2021), American manager of the band Journey
- Walter Herbert (by 1517-64 or later), MP for Breconshire in 1558
- Walter Herbert (of St Julian's) (1509–1550), MP for Monmouthshire (UK Parliament constituency) in 1545
