= Thomas Herbert =

Thomas Herbert may refer to:

- Thomas Herbert (seaman) (1597–1642?), Welsh seaman and author
- Sir Thomas Herbert, 1st Baronet (1606–1682), traveller and historian
- Thomas Herbert, 8th Earl of Pembroke (c. 1656–1733), statesman and President of the Royal Society, MP for Wilton 1679–1683
- Thomas Herbert (Newport MP) (c.1695–1739), British army officer and politician, MP for NewportCornwall 1726–1739
- Thomas Herbert (Royal Navy officer) (1793–1861), British naval officer
- Thomas Arnold Herbert (1863–1940), Member of Parliament for Wycombe, 1906–1910
- Thomas J. Herbert (1894–1974), Governor of Ohio
- Thomas M. Herbert (1927–2014), judge from Ohio
- Thomas Herbert (MP for Monmouthshire), see Monmouthshire (UK Parliament constituency)
