= Herbie Pennell =

American polo player

Alfred G. "Herbie" Pennell (1921–2000) was an American polo player and long-time manager of the Palm Beach Polo and Country Club in Palm Beach, Florida.

== As a polo player ==
In the 1950s and 1960s, Pennell was a renowned polo player, handicapped at 6 outdoors and 8 indoors. He won the Indoor Twelve Goal in 1955, the Delegates and Monty Waterbury Cups in 1956, the U.S. Arena Chairman's Cup (formerly Arena 12-goal and Jr. Championship) six times (1950, 1955, 1957, 1963, 1964, 1965), three Senior Championships (formerly Class A) in 1952, 1956, 1957, the 1952 Inter-circuit Cup (formerly 12-goal), and the 1948 Chairman's Cup (formerly 12-goal).

== As a polo club manager ==
In the 1970s and 1980s, he was the club manager of the Meadowbrook Polo Club, the Blind Brook Polo Club, the Squadron A Armory Polo Club and the Palm Beach Polo and Country Club.

== Legacy ==
The Herbie Pennell Cup is named for him. In 2012, he received the Philip Iglehart Award from the Museum of Polo and Hall of Fame in Lake Worth, Florida.
