= Percy Herbert =

Percy Herbert may refer to:

- Percy Herbert (actor) (1920–1992), British film and television actor
- Percy Herbert (bishop) (1885–1968), English bishop
- Percy Herbert (cricketer) (1878-1958), English cricketer
- Percy Herbert, 2nd Baron Powis (1598–1667), English nobleman
- Percy Egerton Herbert (1822–1876), English politician
