= Arthur Herbert =

Arthur Herbert may refer to:

- Arthur Herbert (musician) (1907–?), American jazz drummer
- Arthur Herbert, 1st Earl of Torrington (c.1648–1716), British admiral and politician
- Sir Arthur James Herbert (general) (1820–1897), general in the British Army
- Sir Arthur James Herbert (diplomat) (1855–1921), first British envoy to Norway
- Arthur Orpen Herbert (1831–1890), public servant in Queensland
