= Herb Klein =

Herb or Herbert Klein may refer to:

- Herbert Klein (barber) (1878–1912), British hairdresser, second-class barber aboard RMS Titanic who died in the sinking
- Herb Klein (journalist) (1918–2009), American press secretary to Richard Nixon
- Herbert Klein (swimmer) (1923–2001), German swimmer
- Herb Klein (politician) (1930–2023), United States Representative from New Jersey
- Herbert S. Klein (born 1936), American historian

== See also ==
- Herbert Kline (1909–1999), American filmmaker
