= Herb Louch =

Australian rules footballer

Personal information
- Full name: Herbert David Louch
- Born: 4 January 1875; Benalla, Victoria
- Died: 29 August 1936 (aged 61); Prahran, Victoria
- Original team: East Brighton

Playing career^{1}
Years	Club	Games (Goals)
1898	St Kilda	1 (0)
- ^{1} Playing statistics correct to the end of 1898.

Herbert David Louch (4 January 1875 – 29 August 1936) was an Australian rules footballer who played with St Kilda in the Victorian Football League (VFL).
