= Jacques Peuchet =

French jurist, statistician and compiler of archives

Jacques Peuchet (6 March 1758 – 28 September 1830) was a French jurist, statistician and compiler of archives. A monarchist, he was keeper of the archives of the French police.

== Life ==
Trained as a lawyer, Peuchet worked as a secretary to André Morellet in the 1780s. He wrote a (1789) 'Discours préliminaire' on police, etc., for the Encyclopédie Méthodique. He was also employed by Charles Alexandre de Calonne and Étienne Charles de Loménie de Brienne.

He inherited Morellet's archives, using them for several works on economics and statistics.

== Works ==
- Dictionnaire universel de la géographie commerçante. 5 vols. Paris: Blanchon, 1793.
- Vocabulaire des termes de commerce, banque, manufactures, navigation marchande, finance mercantile et statistique, 1801
- Statistique élémentaire de la France: contenant les principes de cette science et leur application à l'analyse de la richesse, des forces et de la puissance de l'Empire français: à l'usage des personnes qui se destinent à l'étude de l'administration, 1805
- Campaigns of the armies of France, in Prussia, Saxony, and Poland, Boston: Farrand, Mallory, and Co., 1808. Translated by Samuel Mackay from the French Campagne des armées françaises, en Prusse, en Saxe et en Pologne.

== Quotes ==
Karl Marx gave a vivid summary of Peuchet's career:

Jacques Peuchet proceeded from belles-lettres to medicine, from medicine to law, from law to administration and the police. [He] was an adherent of the French Revolution for only a very short time; he very soon turned to the royalist party [...] he wound his way very cleverly through the revolution, sometimes persecuted, sometimes occupied in the Department of Administration and the Police.
