= Timothy Herbert =

British surgeon (1941–2026)

- Born: Timothy James Herbert; 11 July 1941; Sheffield, England
- Died: 3 October 2026 (aged 85)
- Occupation: Orthopaedic surgeon

Timothy James Herbert (11 July 1941 – 3 October 2026) was a British orthopaedic surgeon who specialised in hand surgery. He was born in Sheffield (UK). He is known for his work with the scaphoid bone and related invention, the Herbert screw.

== Life and career ==
Herbert received his medical training at St Bartholomew's Hospital Medical School in London (1959–1964) and his specialty training at St George's Hospital in London, under Alan Graham Apley. Since 1975 he was with the Hand Surgery Unit at St. Luke's Hospital in Sydney, New South Wales, Australia and became Director of that section. He retired in 1996 at the age of 55.

Herbert died on 3 October 2026, at the age of 85.
