= Pierre-Eugène-Emile Hébert =

French sculptor (1823-1893)

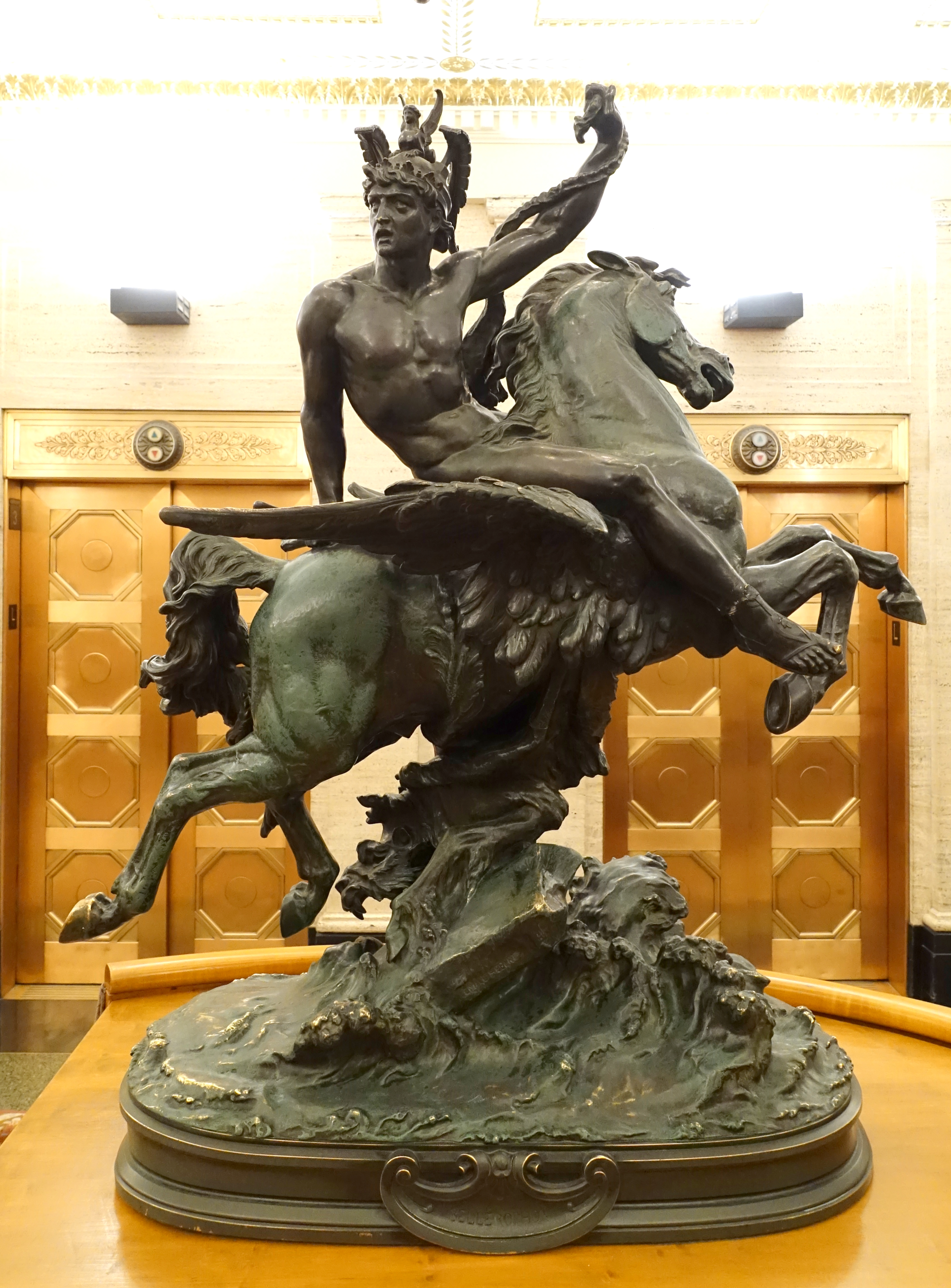
Bellerophon by Émile Hébert, Chicago, Palmer House Hilton Hotel.

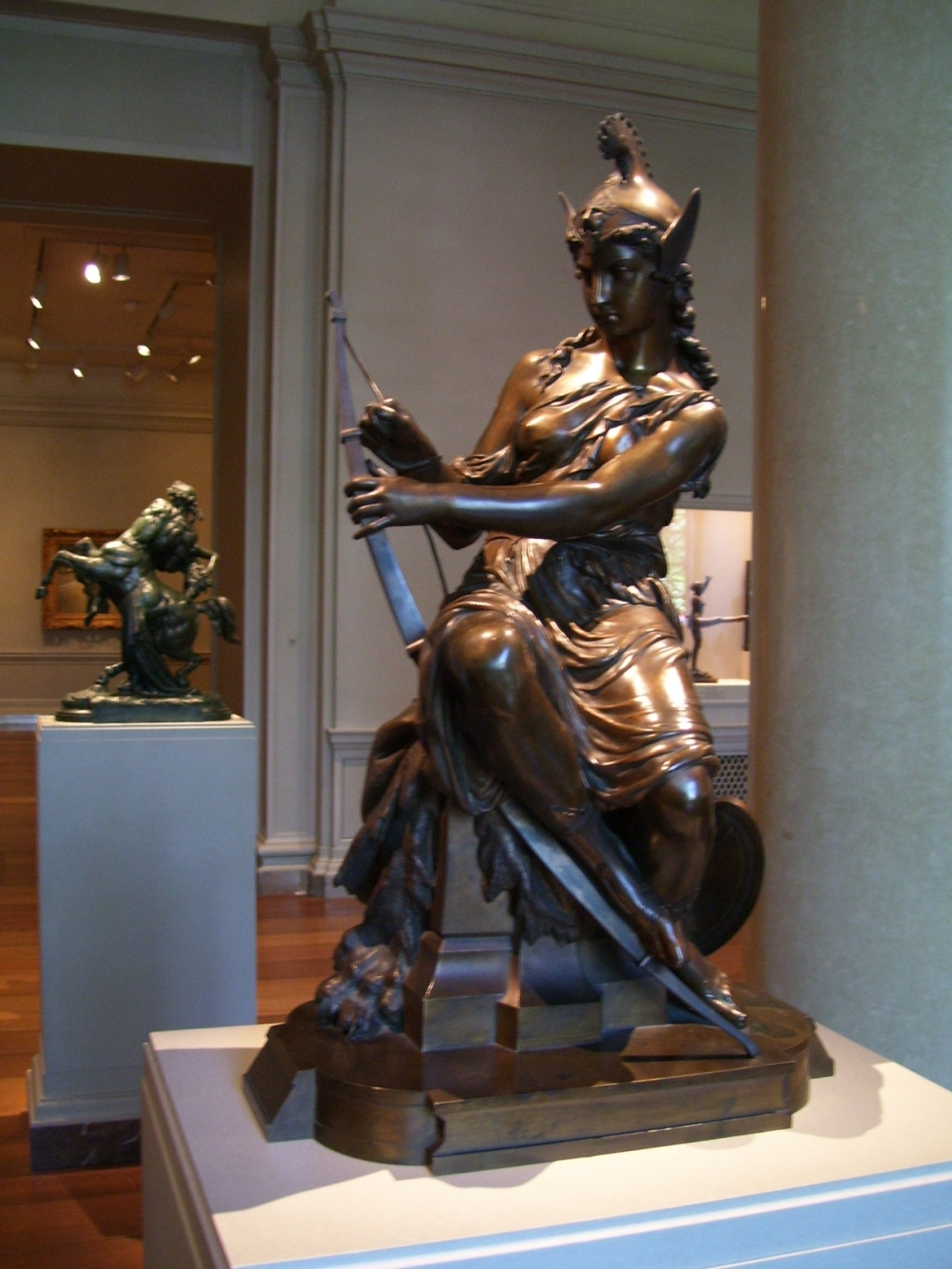
Amazon Preparing for Battle, 1860, Washington, D.C., National Gallery of Art.

Pierre-Eugène-Émile Hébert (October 12 or 20, 1823 – 1893) was a French sculptor. As the son of sculptor Pierre Hébert, he studied with his father and Jean-Jacques Feuchère (1807–1852). Émile Hébert participated in the Salon de Paris and the Exposition Universelle (1855), creating the allegorical statues La Comédie and Le Drame for the vaudeville theatre in Paris. He was awarded a Second Class Medal in 1872. Émile Hébert was one of the few sculptors to collaborate with the renowned bronze fondeur Georges Servant, resulting in pieces in the Neo-Grecian and Egyptian Revival styles.

== Selected works ==
- Jeune fille sauvant une abeille, 1855
- Méphistophélès, bronze, Stanford University, 1855
- L'Amour suppliant, 1859
- Amazone se préparant à la bataille, bronze, National Gallery of Art, Washington, 1860
- Et toujours !! Et jamais !!, Collection Joey and Toby Tanenbaum, Toronto, Canada, 1863
- Bacchus, 1866
- La Pologne, medallion, 1867
- M. Servant, bust, 1867
- Bas-reliefs du monument à L'Amiral Duperré, La Rochelle, 1868
- Œdipe, 1869
- L'Oracle, marble bas-relief, 1872
- Bellérophon vainqueur de la Chimère, 1874
- Sémiramis, reine d'Assyrie, bust, 1874
- Alexandre Tessier, propagateur du moutons mérinos, bronze bust, 1876
- Buste de Balzac, High Museum of Art, Atlanta, 1877
- Table de style néo-grec, Musée d'Orsay, Paris, c. 1878
- Rabelais, Chinon, 1882
- L'Oracle, bas-relief, 1893
