= Lord Herbert =

Lord Herbert may refer to:

- Baron Herbert, a hereditary title created in 1461
- Baron Herbert of Cardiff, a hereditary title created in 1551, subsidiary of the Earl of Pembroke
- Baron Herbert of Chirbury, a hereditary title created several times
- Baron Herbert of Lea, a hereditary title created in 1861
- Nick Herbert, Baron Herbert of South Downs (born 1963), Conservative politician
