= Edward Herbert (priest) =

- Born: 1767
- Died: 1814 (aged 46–47)
- Education: Trinity College Dublin
- Occupation: Anglican priest
- Known for: Archdeacon of Aghadoe (1798–1814); Chancellor of Christ Church Cathedral, Dublin (1809–1814)

Edward Herbert (1767–1814) was Archdeacon of Aghadoe from 1798 until his death.

Herbert was educated at Trinity College, Dublin He held incumbencies at Killarney, Killorglin, Knockane, Lyons Hill and Kill, County Kildare. He was Chancellor of Christ Church Cathedral, Dublin from 1809 until his death.
