= George Herbert (disambiguation) =

George Herbert (1593–1633) was a Welsh poet and priest.

George Herbert may also refer to:

- George Herbert (MP for Monmouthshire), Member of Parliament (MP) for Monmouthshire
- George Herbert (MP for Glamorganshire) (died 1580), MP for Glamorganshire
- George Herbert, 2nd Earl of Powis (1755–1801), Anglo-Welsh peer
- George Herbert, 11th Earl of Pembroke (1759–1827), English peer
- George Herbert (priest) (1825–1894), Anglican priest, Dean of Hereford
- George Herbert, 13th Earl of Pembroke (1850–1895), English peer
- George Herbert, 4th Earl of Powis (1862–1952), British peer
- George Herbert, 5th Earl of Carnarvon (1866–1923), English Egyptologist
- Georges Hébert (1875–1957), pioneering physical educator
- George Herbert (politician) (1892–1982), British Conservative Party politician
- "Lord George Herbert", pseudonymous author and narrator of A Night in a Moorish Harem (1896)
- Michel Pêcheux (1938–1983), French philosopher, used the pseudonym "George Herbert" for his contributions to the journal Cahiers pour l'Analyse
- George Herbert, 7th Earl of Powis (1925–1993), British peer
- George Herbert, 8th Earl of Carnarvon (born 1956), British peer
- Sir George Sidney Herbert (1886 – 1942), English businessman and member of the Royal Household

== See also ==
- 'George Herbert', a pseudonym used by bank robber George Leonidas Leslie
