= Sidney Herbert =

Sidney Herbert may refer to:

- Sidney Herbert, 1st Baron Herbert of Lea (1810–1861)
- Sidney Herbert, 14th Earl of Pembroke (1853–1913)
- Sir Sidney Herbert, 1st Baronet (1890–1939)
- Sidney Herbert, 16th Earl of Pembroke (1906–1969)
