= Claude-Jacques Herbert =

French economist

- Born: 1700; Paris
- Died: 20 February 1758 (aged 57–58); Paris
- Occupation: Economist

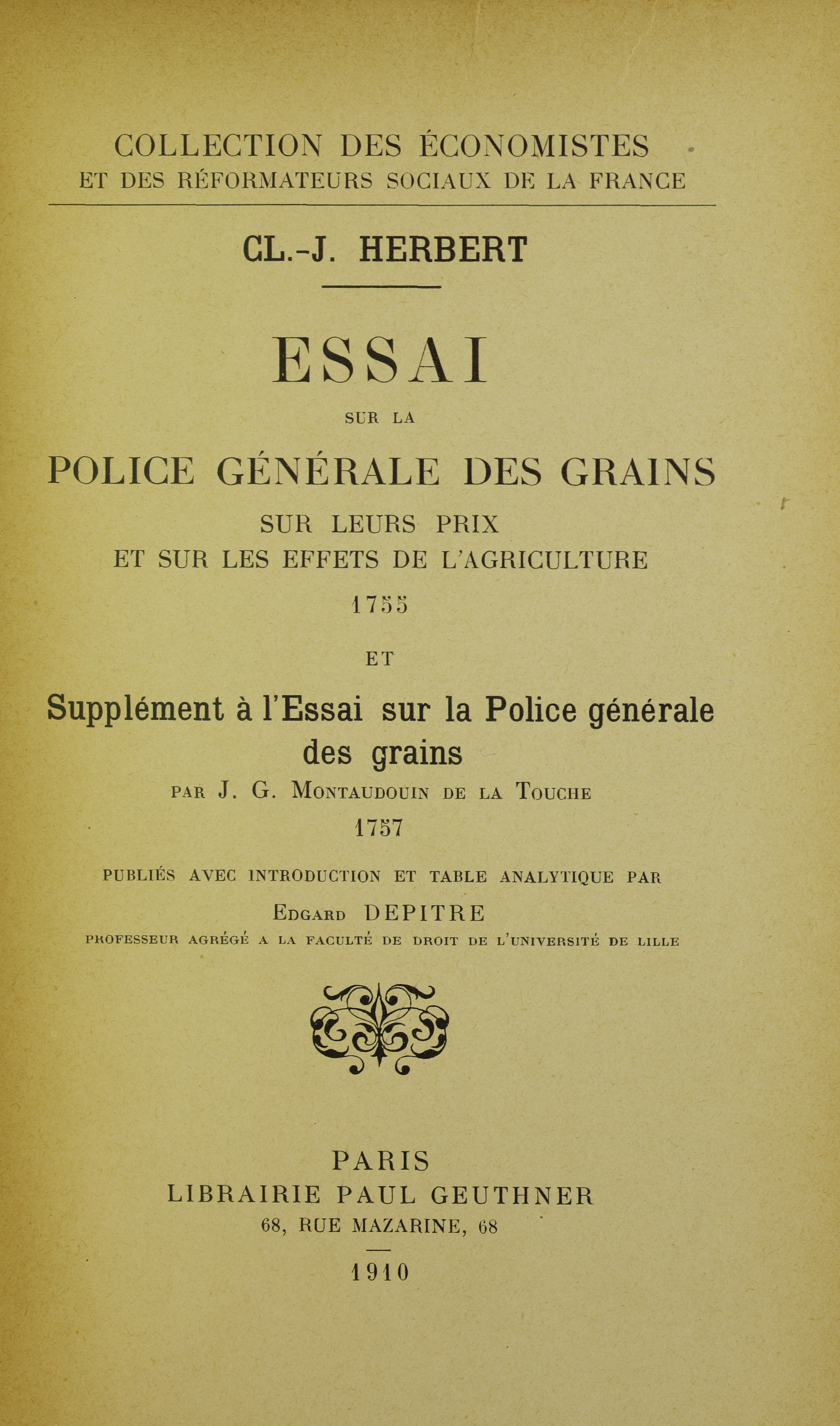
Essai sur la police générale des grains, 1910 edition, title page

Claude-Jacques Herbert (1700 – 1758) was a French economist.

== Works ==
- Essai sur la police générale des grains, sur leurs prix et sur les effets de l'agriculture. Collection des économistes et des réformateurs sociaux de la France (in French). Paris: Paul Geuthner. 1910 [1755].
- Discours sur les vignes (in French). Dijon & Paris: Pissot. 1756.
