= Herbie Redmond =

American groundskeeper (1929–1990)

Herbie Redmond (1929 - April 4, 1990), known variously as "Herbie the Hoofer," "Short Dog," and "Herbie the Love Bug," was the Detroit Tigers' dancing groundskeeper who was one of the most colorful and popular characters in Detroit baseball in the 1970s and 1980s. Born in Birmingham, Alabama, Redmond served in the U.S. Army during the Korean War and worked as a forklift operator for Ford Motor Company before joining the Tiger Stadium grounds crew in 1969.

Redmond entertained the crowd with a trademark jig he danced while sweeping the infield during the fifth inning of nearly every Detroit Tigers' home game from 1969-1989. While he and the grounds crew dragged brooms across the infield to smooth the dirt, Redmond would break into a soft shoe routine, shaking his hips, and then wave his cap to the cheering crowd as he exited. The routine was variously known as the "broom dance," "The Herbie Redmond Show," or the "Herbie Shuffle." In a 1986 interview with the Detroit Free Press, Redmond described the "Herbie Shuffle" this way: "First you strut to third ... they you wave your cap ... next you shake those hips ... and jump for joy ... then kiss that cap ... and salute the team." Redmond had a number of variations on his shuffle, including a country version to John Denver's "Thank God I'm A Country Boy," a limbo version, and a polka version that was also a big hit with the crowd.

According to Redmond, the tradition began when he spontaneously began dancing after a Jim Northrup home run. The next day, Redmond was called to the front office and thought he was going to be fired. Instead, they said: "Herbie, just keep doing what you want to do."

During the Tigers' win-starved years of the 1970s, Redmond got the crowd cheering when there was not much else to cheer for, and the "Herbie Redmond Show" became one of the most popular and anticipated features of a visit to Tiger Stadium. In October 2006, Sports Illustrated chose Redmond for its list of the "10 Greatest Characters in Tigers History," along with Mark Fidrych, Norm Cash, Boots Poffenberger, and Dave Rozema.

In 1984, the Tigers (under the new ownership of Tom Monaghan) banned Redmond from continuing his dance, calling it "distracting." Detroit fans booed and reacted so negatively that the team relented and allowed Herbie to resume his fifth inning performances. Head groundskeeper Frank Feneck said some members of the crew didn't like the routine, "but I never heard a fan say anything bad about him."

In a 1985 interview, Redmond said: "I just get a little rhythm going, get the feet moving and have a little fun. I try to lighten up the people ... If I get loose, maybe they'll get loose, too." Redmond was also quoted as saying: "I loved baseball and here I was getting paid to watch it. Seemed like God couldn't have made a better job."

Hall of fame broadcaster Ernie Harwell called Redmond "an original." Harwell added: "The irony is that the (New York) Yankees tried to hire a man to imitate him, and he failed. You couldn't imitate Herbie. ... It was all spontaneous."

Bob Buchta, a founder of the Tiger Stadium Fan Club, said Redmond was "a symbol to baseball lovers in Detroit. For a lot of us, Herbie captured the democratic spirit of the ballgame. He brought people together in laughter and made the experience more special and more fun. Some of his bosses apparently wished he'd do his job unnoticed, but Herbie was determined to assert his individuality and a lot of us appreciated him for that."

Redmond's sister, Ernestine Ben, described her brother as "a crowd pleaser." She said: "When the Tigers were in a slump, Herbie would always tip his cap and do his bump. The fans adored him."

Redmond died of liver disease at Detroit Receiving Hospital on April 4, 1990. For several months, the ground crew dragged the field in the fifth inning in a "missing broom" formation in Redmond's honor.
