= Máire Herbert =

Irish historian and academic

Máire Herbert MRIA

Academic background
- Education: University College, Galway; University of Cambridge

Academic work
- Discipline: History
- Sub-discipline: Middle Ages; Early medieval Irish history; Irish saints; Hagiography
- Institutions: University College Cork

Máire R. M. Herbert MRIA, also known as Mary Herbert, is an Irish historian and academic, specialising in early medieval Irish history and Irish saints. She is Emeritus Professor of Early and Medieval Irish at University College Cork, and was previously the head of its Scoil Léann Na Gaeilge (School of Irish Learning).

== Biography ==
Herbert pursued Celtic Studies at University College, Galway, taking a Bachelor of Arts (BA) degree in 1968 followed by a Master of Arts (MA) degree in 1970. She was appointed scholar at the School of Celtic Studies within the Dublin Institute for Advanced Studies in October 1970 and researched there for two years until 1972. She later undertook further postgraduate studies as a visiting fellow at Clare Hall, University of Cambridge, completing her research there in 1975 and officially awarded her Doctor of Philosophy (PhD) degree in 1985. Her doctoral thesis was titled "The monastic paruchia of Colum Cille in pre-Norman Ireland: its history and hagiography". Thereafter, Professor Herbert pursued a distinguished academic career in both teaching and research within the National University of Ireland, initially at Maynooth University and then for many years at University College Cork. She has been Visiting Professor at a number of overseas universities and has authored numerous publications.

== Honours ==
In 1996, Herbert was elected a Member of the Royal Irish Academy (MRIA), the premier all-Ireland learned society. In 2015, a Festschrift was published in her honour. In 2018, she was awarded the Derek Allen Prize (Celtic Studies) by the British Academy "for her outstanding contribution to the study of Celtic literature and history".

== Selected works ==
- Herbert, Máire (1988). Iona, Kells, and Derry: the history and hagiography of the monastic familia of Columba. Oxford: Clarendon Press. ISBN 978-0198201144.
- Herbert, Máire; McNamara, Martin (1989). Irish Biblical Apocrypha: Selected Texts in Translation. London: T & T Clark. ISBN 978-0567095244.
- Herbert, Máire; Murray, Kevin, eds. (2003). Retrospect and prospect in Celtic studies: proceedings of the 11th International Congress of Celtic Studies held in University College, Cork, 25-31 July 1999. Dublin: Four Courts. ISBN 978-1851827701.
