= Herbert (given name) =

- Gender: Male

Origin
- Meaning: "army-bright"
- Region of origin: Germanic countries (England, Scotland, Germany, Scandinavian region)

Other names
- Related names: Herb (short), Herbie (nickname), Herbord, Herburt, Herobert, Aribert, Eriberto

Herbert is a Germanic given name, from harja- "army", "warrior" or "noble, sublime", and beraht "bright" or "shining" (compare Robert). Other given names with the same roots include Heribert, Aribert and Eriberto.

== People ==
=== Pre-modern world ===
- Saint Herbert, French Christian saint
- Herbert of Derwentwater (died 687), Anglo-Saxon hermit, priest and saint
- Herbert I of Maine (died 1036), Frankish count
- Herbert II of Maine (died 1062), Frankish count
- Herbert I of Vermandois (848–907), Frankish count
- Herbert II of Vermandois (880–943), Frankish count
- Herbert III of Vermandois (987–997), Frankish count
- Herbert IV, Count of Vermandois (1045–1080), Frankish count
- Herbert of Bosham (died c. 1194), English biographer of Thomas Becket

=== A ===
- Herb Aach (1923–1985), American painter and writer
- Herbert Abbott (British Army officer), English cricketer and British Army officer
- Herbert Abrams, American painter
- Herbert L. Abrams, American physician
- Herbert Aceituno, Salvadorian Paralympic powerlifter
- Herbert Achternbusch (1938–2022), German writer, painter, and filmmaker
- Herbert Adams (novelist) (1874–1958), English mystery writer
- Herbert Adams (sculptor) (1858–1945), American sculptor
- Herbert Baxter Adams (1850–1901), American educator and historian
- Herbert C. Adams (1873–1955), British philatelist
- Herbert Jordan Adams (1838–1912), English entomologist
- Herbert Adamski (1910–1941), German rower
- Herbert Addo (1951–2017), Ghanaian football manager
- Herbert Agar (1897–1980), American journalist and historian
- Herbert Albert (1903–1973), German conductor
- Herbert Albrecht (1900–1945), Nazi-German politician
- Herbert Albrecht (wrestler) (1925–1997), German wrestler
- Herbert Aldinger (born 1943), American author
- Herbert Alington (1842–1938), English cricketer
- Herbert Allen Jr. (born 1940), American businessman
- Herbert Allen III, American businessman
- Herbert Allen (inventor) (1907–1990), American inventor
- Herbert A. Allen Sr. (1908–1997), American stockbroker
- Herbert Alleyne (1855–1884), English footballer
- Herbert Allingham (1867–1936), English editor and writer
- Herbert William Allingham (1862–1904), British surgeon
- Herbert M. Allison (1943–2013), American businessman
- Herbert Allsopp (1855–1920), English cricketer
- Herbert Alsen (1906–1978), German opera singer
- Herbert Altshuler (born 1945), American major general
- Herbert Alward, Austrian figure skater
- Herbert Ames (1863–1954), Canadian politician
- Herbert Anderson (actor) (1917–1994), American actor
- Herbert H. Anderson (1913–2001), American organic chemist
- Herbert L. Anderson (1914–1988), American physicist
- Herbert Andrew (1910–1985), English civil servant
- Herbert Andrewartha (1907–1992), Australian research scientist
- Herbert Edward Andrewes (1863–1950), English entomologist
- Herbert Kennedy Andrews (1904–1965), English composer and organist
- Herbert E. Angel (1907–1999), American Archivist
- Herbert Anijekwu (1964–2013), Nigerian footballer
- Herbert Anscomb (1892–1972), Canadian politician
- Herbert Antcliffe (1875–1940), British musicologist, music critic and author
- Herbert Douglas Anthony (1892–1968), English mathematician
- Herbert Aptheker (1915–2003), American historian
- Herbert Archer (1883–1996), English rugby union footballer
- Herbert Arlene (1914–1989), American politician
- Herbert Rowse Armstrong (1869–1922), English solicitor and convicted murderer
- Herbert W. Armstrong (1892–1986), American evangelist
- Herbert Armstrong (cricketer) (1862–1942), English cricketer
- Herbert Arnarson (born 1970), Icelandic basketball player
- Herbert Asbury (1889–1963), American journalist
- Herbert Ash (1878–1959), Canadian politician
- Herbert Ashman, first Lord mayor of Bristol
- Herbert Ashton (1885–1927), English footballer
- Herbert R. Askins (1898–1982), U.S. Assistant Secretary of the Navy
- H. H. Asquith (1852–1928), leader of the Liberal Party and UK Prime Minister during the First World War
- Herbert Aston (1885–1968), Irish cricketer
- Herbert Austin (1866–1941), English car maker, founder of the Austin Motor Company and Member of Parliament
- Herbert Avram (1913–2006), American chess player
- Herbert Ayre (1882–1966), English footballer

=== B ===
- Herbert Backe (1896–1947), German politician and SS functionary during the Nazi era
- Herbert Baddeley (1872–1931), tennis and badminton player
- Herbert Badham (1899–1961), Austrian realist painter and art educator
- Herbert Baker (1862–1946), English architect
- Herbert Baker (politician) (1866–1941), Canadian politician
- Herbert Baker (screenwriter) (1920–1983), American screenwriter
- Herbert Baker (cricketer) (1880–1958), English cricketer
- Herbert Brereton Baker (1862–1935), English inorganic chemist
- Herbert F. Baker (1862–1930), American politician
- Herbert G. Baker (1920–2001), British-American botanist
- Herbert E. Balch (1869–1958), English archaeologist, geologist, naturalist, and spelunker
- Herbert Baldus (1899–1970), Brazilian ethnologist
- Herbert Ballerina (born 1980), Italian actor, comedian and radio host
- Herbert Bamlett, English football manager and referee
- Herbert Bankole-Bright (1883–1958), Sierra Leonean politician
- Herbert Barbee (1848–1936), American sculptor
- Herbert Bareuther (1914–1945), German World War II flying ace
- Herbert Barker (disambiguation)
- Herbert Barnes (1832–1890), English Anglican clergyman
- Herbert L. Barnet (1909–1970), American business executive
- Herbert Barrie (1927–2017), British paediatrician
- Herbert Roper Barrett (1873–1943), English tennis player
- Herbert Barrett (talent manager) (1910–2007), American talent manager
- Herbert Barritt (1904–1967), English cricketer and educator
- Herbert Bascome (born 1964), Bermudian cricketer
- Herbert Basedow (1881–1933), Australian anthropologist, geologist, politician, explorer and medical practitioner
- Herbert Basser (born 1942), Canadian scholar of religion and Jewish theologian
- Herbert Bate (1871–1941), Anglican priest and theologian
- Herb Bateman (1928–2000), American politician
- Herbert Bauer (disambiguation)
- Herbert Baum (1912–1942), German Jewish anti-Nazi resistance activist
- Herbert Baumann (1925–2020), German composer
- Herb Baumeister (1947–1996), American businessman and suspected serial killer
- Herbert Baumer (1885–1972), American architect
- Herbert Baumgard (1920–2016), American rabbi
- Herbert Bautista (born 1968), Filipino actor and politician
- Herbert Baxter (disambiguation)
- Herbert Bayer (1900–1985), Austrian graphic designer
- Herbert Beattie (1926–2019), American opera singer
- Herbert Bedford (1867–1945), British composer
- Herbert Bednorz (1909–1989), Polish Catholic priest
- Herbert Benson (1935–2022), American medical doctor
- Herbert Berghof (1909–1990), American actor
- Herbert von Bismarck (1849–1904), German diplomat
- Herbert Blaché (1882–1953), British-born American film director, producer and screenwriter
- Herbert Black, Canadian businessman
- Herbert Blain (1870–1942), British politician, businessman, and trade unionist
- Herbert Blaize (1918–1989), Grenadian politician, Chief Minister and Prime Minister of Grenada
- Herbert Blake (1894–1958), English footballer
- Herbert Edward Douglas Blakiston (1862–1942), English academic and clergyman, president of Trinity College, Oxford, and vice-chancellor of the University of Oxford
- Herbert Blankenhorn (1904–1991), German diplomat
- Herbert Blau (1926–2013), American director and theoretician of performance
- Herbert Blendinger (1936–2020), Austrian composer and viola player
- Herbert Bloch (1911–2006), Harvard professor, Greek and Roman Classicist, expert on Medieval monasticism
- Herbert "Herblock" Block (1909–2001), American editorial cartoonist and author
- Herbert Blöcker (1943–2014), German equestrian
- Herbert Blomstedt (1927-2026), Swedish conductor
- Herbert Blumberg (1869–1934), British Royal Marines officer
- Herbert Blumer (1900–1987), American sociologist
- Herbert Bockhorn (born 1995), German association footballer
- Herbert Böhme (1907–1971), German poet and Nazi activist
- Herbert Bolt (1893–1916), Australian rugby league footballer and World War I soldier
- Herbert Bolton (disambiguation)
- Herbert Bomzer (1927–2013), American rabbi
- Herb Bonn (1916–1943), American basketball player
- Herbert Covington Bonner (1891–1965), American politician
- Herbert Stephenson Boreman (1897–1982), American judge
- Herbert Bösch (born 1954), Austrian politician
- Herbert Bostock (1869–1954), English cricketer
- Herbert Böttcher (1907–1950), German lawyer, policeman, and Nazi executed for Holocaust perpetration
- Herbert Bötticher (1928–2008), German actor
- Herbert Bowman (1897–1980), American tennis player
- Herbert Boyer (born 1936), American researcher and businessman
- Herbert Bradley (1888–1918), English footballer
- Herbert Edwin Bradley (1871–1961), Canadian-born American lawyer, real estate investor, big-game hunter and zoo director
- Herbert Brede (1888–1942), Estonian general
- Herbert J. Brees (1877–1958), United States Army lieutenant general
- Herbert Brean (1907–1973), American writer
- Herbert Breiter (1927–1999), German-born Austrian painter and lithographer
- Herbert Brenon (1880–1958), Irish film director
- Herbert Breslin (1924–2012), American music industry executive
- Herbert Brewer (1865–1928), English composer and organist
- Herbert W. Briggs (1900–1990), American lawyer
- Herbert Brittain (1894–1961), English civil servant
- Herbert Brodkin (1912–1990), American director and producer
- Herbert Paul Brooks (1937–2003), American ice hockey player and coach
- Herbert C. Brown (1912–2004), American chemist
- Herbert Brownell Jr. (1904–1996), American politician
- Herbert Brucker (1898–1977), American journalist
- Herbert Brün (1918–2000), German-born American musician and cybernetician
- Herbert Bruncken (born 1896), American poet and magazine editor
- Herbert Büchs, (1913–1996), German lieutenant general
- Herbert Buckler (1878–1957), Welsh rugby league footballer
- Herbert Ashwin Budd (1881–1950), British painter
- Herbert P. Buetow (1898–1972), American businessman
- Herbert Buhtz (1911–2006), German rower
- Herbert Bullmore (1874–1937), Scottish international rugby union player
- Herbert Bullock (1885–1967), British trade unionist
- Herbert Bunning (1863–1937), English composer and director
- Herbert Bunston (1874–1935), English actor
- Herbert Burden (1898–1915), British First World War deserter
- Herbert Burns (born 1988), Brazilian mixed martial artist
- Herbert Burrell (1866–1949), English cricketer
- Herbert Burrows (1845–1922), British socialist activist
- Herbert Burton (1888–1961), New Zealand cricketer
- Herbert Burton Sr. (1864–1910), New Zealand cricketer
- Herbert Bury (1853–1933), Anglican bishop
- Herbert Busemann (1905–1994), German-American mathematician
- Herbert Buster (1914–1976), American baseball player
- Herbert Butterfield (1900–1979), British historian

=== C ===
- Herbert Cahn (1915–2002), Swiss numismatist
- Herbert Callen (1919–1993), American physicist
- Herbert Campbell (actor) (1844–1904), English musical theatre actor
- Herbert Carlsson (1896–1952), Swedish footballer
- Herbert Carter (pilot) (1919–2012), U.S. Army Air Force officer
- Herbert Augustine Carter (1874–1916), Recipient of the Victoria Cross
- Herbert James Carter (1858–1940), Australian naturalist/ entomologist and teacher
- Herbert S. Carter (1869–1927), American physician and writer
- Herbert St Maur Carter (1878–1957), Irish-born British military officer, doctor and surgeon
- Herbert Cartwright (born 1916), English footballer
- Herbert Cassidy (1935–2013), Irish Anglican dean
- Herbert Casson (disambiguation)
- Herbert Hayton Castens (1864–1929), South African rugby union footballer and cricketer
- Herbert Cayzer, 1st Baron Rotherwick (1851–1958), British politician
- Herbert Chabot (1931–2022), judge of the United States Tax Court
- Herbert Clark (disambiguation)
- Herbert Clarke (disambiguation)
- Herbert Clay (1881–1923), American politician
- Herbert Clemens (born 1939), American mathematician
- Herbert Clogstoun (1820–1862), British Army major in the Second Anglo-Burmese War
- Herbert Close (1890–1971), better known as Meredith Starr, British occultist and poet
- Herbert Coddington (born 1959), American serial killer
- Herbert Cohen (disambiguation)
- Herbert Coman (1920–2009), American football player and coach
- Herbert Comerford (1915–2005), British trade unionist
- Herbert Cook (disambiguation)
- Herbert Cowans (1904–1993), American jazz musician
- Herbert Coward (1938–2004), American actor
- Herbert Cowell (1858–1943), American architect
- Herbert Cowley (1885–1967), British botanist
- Herbert Cox (disambiguation)
- Herbert Cozens-Hardy, 1st Baron Cozens-Hardy (1838–1920), British politician and judge
- Herbert Crabtree (1880–1951), English cricketer
- Herbert Cragg (1910–1980), Anglican priest and author
- Herbert Craig (1869–1934), British politician, businessman and barrister
- Herbert Craik (1881–1965), Scottish footballer
- Herbert Cramer (1894–1963), American football, basketball, and baseball player and college head coach
- Herbert Crawford (1878–1946), Canadian politician
- Herbert Croft (disambiguation)
- Herbert Croly (1869–1930), American writer
- Herbert Crowley (1873–1937), British painter
- Herbert Crüger (1911–2003), German political activist and member of the resistance against the Nazis
- Herbert Czaja (1914–1997), German politician

=== D ===
- Herbert Danby (1889–1953), Anglican priest and Oxford University professor
- Herbert Darnley (1872–1947), British musician and performer Herbert Walter McCarthy
- Herbert Diess (born 1958), Austrian businessman
- Herbert Dingle (1890–1978), English physicist and philosopher of science
- Herbert von Dirksen (1882–1955), German diplomat and last German Ambassador to the United Kingdom before World War II
- Herbert Distel (born 1942), Swiss artist
- Herbert Henry Dow (1866–1930), Canadian-born American industrialist
- Herbert Dreilich (1942–2004), German singer
- Herbert Druce (1846–1913), English entomologist
- Herbert Dyer (1898–1974), English coppersmith

=== E ===
- Herbert Eastwood (1881–1954), English trade unionist and politician
- Herbert Eimert (1897–1972), German musicologist and composer
- Herbert Eisner (1921–2011), British writer
- Herbert Eiteljörge (1934–2014), German footballer
- Herbert Eldemire (1930–2010), Jamaican politician
- Herbert Elkuch (born 1952), Liechtenstein politician
- Herbert Elliott (1887–1973), English cricketer
- Herbert Ellis (disambiguation)
- Herbert William Emerson (1881–1962), British India public servant
- Herbert Emmett (fl. 1919–1927), English footballer
- Herbert Emmitt (1857–1901), English cricketer
- Herbert Endeley (born 2001), American soccer player
- Herbert Enderton (1936–2010), American mathematician
- Herbert Engelsing (1904–1962), German lawyer and resistance fighter
- Herbert Esche (1874–1962), German entrepreneur
- Herbert Ettengruber (born 1941), German politician
- Herbert Eze (fl. 1990–1992), Nigerian politician and lieutenant colonel

=== F ===
- Herbert Fallas (1861–c. 1900), English rugby union footballer
- Herbert Fandel (born 1964), German former football referee
- Herbert Farjeon (1887–1943), British songwriter
- Herbert Farmer (disambiguation)
- Herbert E. Farnsworth (1834–1908), American Civil War sergeant major awarded the Medal of Honor
- Herbert Cyrus Farnum (1866–1926), American landscape painter
- Herbie Farnworth (born 1999), England rugby league footballer
- Herbert Fechner (1913–1998), German politician
- Herbert Federer (1920–2010), American mathematician
- Herbert Feigl (1902–1988), Austrian‐American philosopher
- Herbert Feis (1893–1972), American historian
- Herbert Feith (1930–2001), Australian academic
- Herbert Felix (1908–1973), Swedish entrepreneur
- Herbi Felsinger (1934–2018), Sri Lankan cricket umpire
- Herbert Feltham (1920–1994), South African cricketer
- Herbert Ferber (1906–1991), American painter and sculptor
- Herbert Fielding (1923–2015), American politician
- Herbert Fields (1897–1958), American dramatist
- Herbert Fingarette (1921–2018), American philosopher
- Herbert O. Fisher (1909–1990), American test pilot and aviation executive
- Herb Fitzgibbon (born 1942), American tennis player
- Herbert Fitzherbert (1885–1958), Royal Navy admiral in British India
- Herbert FitzSimons (1898–1970), Australian politician
- Herbert Flam (1928–1980), American tennis player
- Herbert Foerstel (1933–2024), American librarian and author
- Herbert Fordham (1854–1929), English writer
- Herbert Forrest, Ireland national rugby union footballer
- Herbert Forsyth (1868–1989), New Zealand cricketer
- Herbert Fortier (1857–1949), Canadian actor
- Herbert L. Foss (1871–1937), American Navy Seaman during the Spanish–American War
- Herbert Fox (1858–1926), English cricketer
- Herbert Foxwell (1849–1936), English economist
- Herbert W. Franke (1927–2022), Austrian writer
- Herbert Freeman (1925–2020), American computer scientist
- Herbert Freudenberger (1926–1999) German-American psychologist
- Herbert Freundlich (1880–1941), German chemist
- Herbert Friedenwald (1870–1944), Jewish-American librarian and historian
- Herbert Friedman (1916–2000), American astronomer
- Herbert A. Friedman (1918–2008), American rabbi
- Herbert Friedmann (1900–1987), American ornithologist
- Herbert Fritz (1918–1996), Nazi general
- Herbert Fritz Jr. (1915–1998), American architect
- Herbert Fritzenwenger (born 1962), West German cross-country skier and biathlete
- Herbert Fröhlich (1905–1991), British physicist
- Herbert Frood (1864–1931), English inventor, industrialist, and entrepreneur
- Herbert Furth (1889–1995), American economist
- Herbert Fust (1899–1974), German Nazi politician and Sturmabteilung (paramilitary) commander in Hamburg
- Herbert Fux (1927–2007), Austrian actor

=== G ===
- Herbert J. Gans (1927–2025), American sociologist
- Herbert Gelernter (1930–2015), American scientist
- Herbert Giles (1845–1935), British diplomat and translator
- Herbert Gold (1924–2023), American novelist
- Herbert Gould (1891–1918), British First World War flying ace
- Herbert Grönemeyer (born 1956), German actor and musician
- Herbert Gross (1929–2020), American mathematician

=== H ===
- Herbert Hagen (1913–1999), SS-Sturmbannführer of Nazi Germany and a personal assistant to the SS police chief in France
- Herbert Hainer (born 1954), German businessman, president of Bayern Munich and former CEO of Adidas-Group
- Herbert Haines (archaeologist) (1826–1872), English archaeologist
- Herbert Haines (1880–1923), British composer
- Herbert Hall (disambiguation)
- Herbert Halpert (1911–2000), American anthropologist
- Herbert Hamblen (1849–1908), American author
- Herbert M. Hamblen (1905–1994), American politician
- Herbert Hasler (1914–1987), British Royal Marines lieutenant colonel and yachtsman
- Herbert Haupt (born 1947), Austrian politician
- Herbert Hans Haupt (1919–1942), American spy and saboteur for the Nazis
- Herbert Hauptman (1917–2011), American mathematician
- Herbert Hayens (1861–1944), English novelist and editor
- Herbert Heairfield (1907–2006), Australian cricketer
- Herbert Heath (1861–1954), British Royal Navy admiral, Second Sea Lord and Chief of Naval Personnel
- Herbert William Heinrich (1886–1962), American industrial safety pioneer
- Herbert Herbert (1865–1942), British ophthalmologist
- Herbert Hill (disambiguation)
- Herbert Hirche (1910–2002), German architect and designer
- Herbert E. Hitchcock (1867–1958) American politician
- Herbert Hoover (1874–1964), American politician, 31st president of the United States
- Herbert Hoover Jr. (1903–1969), American engineer, businessman and politician, eldest son of the 31st U.S. president
- Herbert N. Houck (1915–2002), American flying ace awarded three Navy Crosses during World War II
- Herbert Howells (1892–1983), English composer, organist and teacher known for his Anglican church music
- Herbert Hübel (born 1958), Austrian lawyer and sports official
- Herbert Huber (disambiguation)
- Herbert Hübner (1889–1972), German actor
- Herbert Hudd (1881–1948), Australian politician
- Herbert Hughes (disambiguation)
- Herbert Hughes-Stanton (1870–1937), British painter
- Herbert Hull (1886–1970), English cricketer
- Herbert Hultgren (1917–1997), American cardiologist and professor
- Herbert Huncke (1915–1996), American writer and poet
- Herbert Hunger (1914–2000), Austrian Byzantinist
- Herbert Hunt (disambiguation)
- Herbert Huppertz (1919–1944), Nazi pilot
- Herbert Hurrey (1888–1961), Australian rules footballer
- Herbie Hutchisson (1915–1968), American basketball player
- Herbert Hutner (1908–2008), American lawyer
- Herbert Hüttner (born 1942), German sailor
- Herbert J. Hutton (1937–2007), American judge

=== I ===
- Herbert Ihlefeld (1914–1995), German Spanish Civil War and World War II flying ace
- Herbert Ihering (1888–1977), German dramaturge, director, and theatre critic
- Herbert Ilsanker (born 1967), Austrian footballer
- Herbert Inch (1904–1988), American composer
- Herbert Ingram (1811–1860), British journalist and politician
- Herbert Ingrey (1886–1968), Canadian politician
- Herbert Irving (1917–2016), American philanthropist
- Herbert Carmichael Irwin (1894–1930), Irish aviator and Olympic athlete
- Herbert Isaac (1899–1962), English cricketer

=== J ===
- Herbert Jackson (disambiguation)
- Herbert Jacobs (1903–1987), American journalist
- Herbert James (disambiguation)
- Herbert Jankuhn (1905–1990), German archaeologist
- Herbert Jans (born 1979), Chilean rower
- Bert Jansch (1943–2011), Scottish folk musician
- Herbert Janssen (1892–1965), German opera singer
- Herbert Eric Jansz (1890–1976), Sri Lankan Burgher civil servant
- Herbert Jarczyk (1913–1968), German composer
- Herbert Jasper (1906–1999), Canadian psychologist and physiologist
- Herbert Jehle (1907–1983), German-American physicist
- Herbert Jenner (1806–1904), English barrister and cricketer
- Herbert Jenner-Fust (1778–1852), English judge
- Herbert Jenner-Fust (cricketer) (1841‐1940), English cricketer
- Herbert Jepson (1908–1993), American artist and designer
- Herbert Jessel, 1st Baron Jessel (1866–1950), British politician
- Herbert Jones (disambiguation)
- Herbert Jory (1888–1966), South Australian architect
- Herbert Juttke (1897–1952), German screenwriter

=== K ===
- Herbert Kaiser (1916–2003), German World War II flying ace
- Herbert Kalmus (1881–1963), American scientist and engineer
- Herbert Kappler (1907–1978), Nazi German SS officer and head of German police and security services in Rome
- Herbert von Karajan (1908–1989), Austrian conductor
- Herb Karpel (1917–1995), American baseball player
- Herbert Kasper (1926–2020), American fashion designer
- Herbert Katzman (1923–2004), American artist
- Herbert Buckingham Khaury (1932–1996), American musician better known as Tiny Tim
- Herbert Kilpin (1870–1916), English footballer
- Herbert Kirchhoff (1911–1988), German art director
- Herbert Kirchner (born 1937), German biathlete
- Herbert Kirk (1912–2006), member of the Parliament of Northern Ireland
- Herbert Kirkpatrick (1888–1971), Anglican priest
- Herbert Kirschner (1925–2010), German canoeist
- Herbert Kissling (1868–1929), New Zealand cricketer
- Herbert Kisza (born 1943), Czech artist
- Herbert Kitchener, 1st Earl Kitchener (1850–1916), British First World War field marshal and colonial administrator
- Herbert Kitschelt (born 1955), American political science scholar
- Herbert Körner (1902–1966), German cinematographer
- Herbert Kohler Jr. (1939–2022), American businessman
- Herbert C. Kraft (1927–2000), American archaeologist
- Herbert Kranz (1891–1973), German writer
- Herbert J. Krapp (1887–1973), American architect
- Herbert Kraus (1884–1965), German law professor
- Herbert Krause (1905–1976), American author and historian
- Herbert Kubly (1915–1996), American author and playwright
- Herbert Kuhl (1940–2024), German gynecologist
- Herbert Kuhner (born 1935), Austrian writer and translator
- Herbert Kutscha (1917–2003), German World War II flying ace

=== L ===
- Herbert Laabs (born 1950), German canoeist
- Herbert Laming, Baron Laming (born 1936), British social worker and politician
- Herbert Lang (1879–1957), German zoologist
- Herbert "Flight Time" Lang (born 1976), basketball player for the Harlem Globetrotters
- Herbert Lange (1909–1945), German Nazi SS officer and Holocaust perpetrator
- Herbert Larkin (1894–1972), Australian pilot, human rights activist, and author
- Herbert Lawrence (1861–1943), general in the British Army, one of the principal commanders of Battle of Romani
- Herbert Leaf (1854–1936), English cricketer
- Herbert Leavey (1886–1954), English footballer and manager
- Herbert Leon (1850–1926), English businessman and politician
- Herbert B. Leonard (1922–2006), American film producer
- Herbert Léonard (1945–2025), French singer
- Herbert Levine (disambiguation)
- Herbert Lewis (disambiguation)
- Herbert L. Ley Jr. (1923–2001), American civil servant
- Herbert Lichtenfeld (1927–2001), German screenwriter
- Herbert Lieberman (1933–2023), American novelist
- Herbert Lindinger (born 1933), Austrian industrial designer
- Herbert Lindlar (1909–2009), British chemist
- Herbert Linge (1928–2024), German professional racecar driver
- Herbert Linnell (1909–1968), English cricketer
- Herbert Lippert (born 1957), Austrian opera singer
- Bert Lipsham (1878–1932), English footballer and manager
- Herbert Lippschitz (1904–1972), German art director
- Herbert List (1903–1975), German photographer
- Herbert Lloyd (1883–1957), Australian soldier and politician
- Sir Herbert Lloyd, 1st Baronet (1719–1769), Welsh politician
- H. S. Lloyd (1887–1963), breeder of show English Cocker Spaniels
- Herbert Loch (1886–1976), German general in World War II
- Herbert Lock (1887–1957), English footballer
- Herbert Lockyer (1886–1984), theological writer
- Herbert Loebl (1923–2013), British businessman
- Herbert Loewe (1882–1940), British scholar
- Herbert Lom (1917–2012), Czech actor
- Herbert Looker (1871–1951), British politician
- Herbert Louis (1928–2016), American physician
- Herbert Lumsden (1897–1945), senior British Army officer of World War I and II
- Herbert Lüthy (1918–2002), Swiss historian and journalist
- Herbert Lütje (1918–1967), German World War II flying ace and wing commander, officer in the postwar German Air Force

=== M ===
- Herbert H. Manson (1872–1914), American lawyer
- Herbert Marcuse (1898–1979), German philosopher
- Herbert Marshall (disambiguation)
- Herbert Maryon (1874–1965), English archaeologist and metalworking expert
- Herbert Mason (1891–1960), British film director and producer
- Herbert Louis Mason (1896–1994), American botanist
- Herbert McCabe (1926–2001), English-born Irish Dominican priest, theologian, and philosopher
- Herbert Meier (1928–2018), Swiss writer and translator
- Herbert Mohr (born 1988), German politician
- Herbert Mohring (1928–2012), American transportation economist and educator
- Herbert Money (1899–1996), Australian Christian missionary
- Herbert Moran (1885–1945), Australian international rugby union footballer
- Herbert Morris (disambiguation)
- Herbert Morrison (1888–1965), British politician
- Herbert Morrison (journalist) (1905–1989), American journalist
- Herbert Knowles Morrison (1854–1885), American entomologist
- Herbert Mosenthal (1866–1904), South African cricketer
- Herbert Moss (1883–1956), Scottish politician
- Herbert Mullin (1947–2022), American serial killer and mass murderer

=== N ===
- Herbert Nachbar (1930–1980), German writer
- Herbert Wassell Nadal (1873–1957), Minstrel show performer
- Herbert Nakimayak (fl. 2015–2019, Canadian politician
- Herbert Naylor-Leyland (1864–1899), British Army officer and politician
- Herbert Nebe (1899–1985), German cyclist
- Herbert Needleman (1927–2017), American researcher
- Herbert Neumann (born 1953), German footballer
- Herbert Newman (born 1873), English cricketer
- Herbert Nicholls (1868–1940), Australian judge and politician
- Herbert Nield (1862–1932), British politician
- Herbert Niemann (1935–1991), East German judoka and Olympic athlete
- Herbert Nigsch (born 1960), Austrian wrestler
- Herbert Niiler (1905–1982), Estonian basketball player and coach
- Herbert Ninaus (1937–2015), Austrian footballer
- Herbert Nitsch (born 1970), Austrian freediver
- Herbert Nkabiti (1981–2017), Botswana boxer
- Herbert Nootbaar (1908–2016), American businessman
- Herbert Norkus (1916–1932), Hitler youth member killed by communists
- Herbert Norsch (1908–1955), American sound engineer
- Herbert Norville (born 1957), English film actor
- Herbert Noyes (1839–1917), British Anglican priest and author
- Herbert Numa (1925–1984), Australian cricketer
- Herbert Nürnberg (1914–1995), German boxer

=== O ===
- Herbert Oakeley (1830–1903), English composer
- Herbert Oberhofer (1955–2012), Austrian footballer
- Herbert Obst (born 1936), Canadian fencer
- Herbert Oehmichen (1915–1990), American handball player
- Herbert Gouverneur Ogden (1846–1906), American geographer
- Herbert Marvin Ohlman (1927–2002), American information technology pioneer
- Herbert Ohly (1901–1972), German jurist
- Herbert S. Okun (1930–2011), American diplomat
- Herbert Olbrich (1897–1976), German World War II Generalleutnant
- Herbert Oldfield (1859–1940), English philatelist and solicitor
- Herbert Olivecrona (1891–1980), Swedish professor and brain surgeon
- Herbert Arnould Olivier (1861–1952), English painter
- Herbert Olney (1875–1957), Australian politician
- Herbert Olofsson (1910–1978), Swedish wrestler
- Herbert Ormond (1867–1934), English draper and politician
- Herbert Osborn (1856–1954), American entomologist
- Herbert L. Osgood (1855–1918), American historian
- Herbert Isambard Owen (1850–1927), British academic

=== P ===
- Herbert Pagani (1944–1988), Italian artist and musician
- Herbert Parmet (1929–2017), American writer and historian
- Herbert Parry (1869–1940), English Christian religious leader
- Herbert Parsons (disambiguation)
- Herbert J. Paterson (1867–1940), British surgeon and gastroenterologist
- Herbert A. Patey (1898–1919), British First World War flying ace
- Herbert Paul (1853–1935), English writer and politician
- Herbert Paul (footballer) (born 1994), German footballer
- Herbert E. Peabody (died 1930), American businessman
- Herbert Pearce (1908–1955), New Zealand rugby league footballer
- Herb Pearson (1910–2006), New Zealand cricketer
- Herbert Pease, 1st Baron Daryngton (1867–1949), British politician
- Herbert Pell (1884–1961), American politician
- Herbert Perez (born 1959), American taekwondo practitioner
- Herbert Perrott (disambiguation)
- Herbert Perry (born 1969), American baseball player
- Herbert Perry (sport shooter) (1894–1966), British sport shooter
- Herbert Philbrick (1915–1993), American businessman
- Herbert Philips (died 1905), English philanthropist and justice of the peace
- Herbert Phillips (disambiguation)
- Herbert Pitman (1877–1961), English Merchant Navy sailor, Third Principal Commanding Officer of Titanic
- Herbert Plumer, 1st Viscount Plumer (1857–1932), British Army field marshal of the First World War
- Herbert L. Pratt (1871–1945), American oil industrialist
- Herbert Pratten (1865–1928), Australian politician
- Herbert Irving Preston (1876–1928), American Marine and Medal of Honor recipient
- Herbert Polzhuber (1938–2015), Austrian fencer and pentathlete
- Herbert Ponting (1870–1935), English explorer and photographer
- Herbert A. Posner (1925–2018), American politician
- Herbert Postle (1884–1961), Australian politician
- Herbert Pott (1883–1953), British diver
- Herbert Pottle (1907–2002), Canadian judge and politician
- Herbert Potts (1878–1939), English footballer
- Herbert B. Powell (1903–1998), U.S. Army general and Commanding General of the U.S. Continental Army Command
- Herbert Pundik (1927–2019), Danish-Israeli journalist and author
- Herbert Purey-Cust (1857–1938), British hydrographer and British Royal Navy officer
- Herbert Putnam (1861–1955), American Librarian of Congress

=== Q ===
- Herbert Quandt (1910–1982), German industrialist
- Herbert Quick (1861–1925), American novelist
- Herbert Quin (1891–1968), Northern Ireland politician

=== R ===
- Herbert Rahmann (1886–1957), Australian cricketer
- Herbert Randall (born 1936), American photographer
- Herbert Raphael (1859–1924), British barrister and politician
- Herbert Ratner (1907–1997), American physician
- Herbert Rawdon (1904–1975), American aviation pioneer
- Herbert Rawlinson (1885–1953), English actor
- Herbert Rawson (1852–1924), English footballer and British Army officer
- Herbert J. Ray (1893–1970), United States Navy rear admiral
- Herbert Raymer (1874–1956), New Zealand Christian dean
- Herbert Rayner (1911–1976), Royal Canadian Navy vice admiral and Chief of the Naval Staff
- Herbert F. Raynolds (1874/5–1950), American judge
- Herbert Read (disambiguation)
- Herbert Reed (disambiguation)
- Herbert Ribbing (1897–1985), Swedish diplomat
- Herbert Richers (1923–2009), Brazilian actor
- Herbert Richmond (1871–1946), British Royal Navy admiral
- Herbert Ricke (1901–1976), German archaeologist, Egyptologist, and historian
- Herbert Rieckhoff (1989–1948), German World War II general
- Herbert Riehl (1915–1997), German-American meteorologist
- Herbert D. Riley (1904–1973), United States Navy aviator and vice admiral
- Herbert Rinaldi (1928–2010), American politician
- Herbert Hope Risley (1850–1911), British ethnographer and colonial administrator
- Herbert W. Roesky (1935–2025), German chemist
- Herbert Rollins (1899–1921), Irish cricketer
- Herbert Rollwage (1916–1980), German World War II flying ace
- Herbert Romeril (1881–1963), English politician
- Herbert Ross (1927–2001), American director
- Bert Roth (1917–1994), New Zealand librarian, historian and labor organizer
- Herbert Rothwell (born 1880), English footballer
- Herbert Rowley (1897–1966), British First World War flying ace and air commodore
- Herbert Rudley (1910–2006), American actor
- Herbert Ruff (1918–1985), German-Canadian pianist and composer
- Herbert Runge (1913–1986), German boxer
- Herbert Rusche (1952–2024), German politician
- Herbert J. Rushton (1877–1947), American lawyer and politician
- Herbert Ryman (1910–1989), American artist

=== S ===
- Herbert Saffir (1917–2007), American civil engineer
- Herbert Salvatierra (born 1980), Bolivian politician
- Herbert Salzman (1916–1990), American businessman and US Ambassador to the Organisation for Economic Co-operation and Development
- Herbert Samuel, 1st Viscount Samuel (1870–1963), British politician
- Herbert Charles Sanborn (1873–1967), American philosopher, academic and one-time political candidate
- Herbert Sandberg (1908–1991), German artist
- Herbert Sandberg (conductor) (1902–1966), Swedish conductor, librettist and composer
- Herbert Sandler (1931–2019), American banker and philanthropist
- Herb Sargent (1923–2005), American television writer and producer
- Herbert Samuel, 1st Viscount Samuel (1870–1963), British politician
- Herbert L. Satterlee (1863–1947), American lawyer, writer, and businessman
- Herbert Sausgruber (born 1946), Austrian politician
- Herbert Scarf (1920–2015), American economist
- Herbert Scaping (1866–1934), Irish architect
- Herbert Schwamborn (born 1973), Zimbabwean music producer
- Herbert Schultze (1909–1987), German World War II U-boat commander
- Herbert Schutz (1937–2018), German-born Canadian philologist
- Herbert F. Seawell (1869–1949), American judge
- Herbert Seifert (1907–1996), German mathematician
- Herbert J. Seligmann (1891–1984), American photographer, author and journalist
- Herbert Sellars (1896–1918), British First World War flying ace
- Herbert Selpin (1904–1942), German film director, editor and screenwriter
- Herbert M. Seneviratne (1925–1987), Sri Lankan Sinhala lyricist and actor
- Herbert Clifford Serasinghe, Sri Lankan Sinhala physician
- Herbert A. Simon (1916–2001), American political scientist
- Herbert Slade (1851–1913), New Zealand boxer
- Herbert Slater (1881–1958), English cricketer
- Herbert Slatery (born 1952), American politician
- Herbert Smith (disambiguation)
- Herbert Snook (1867–1937), English footballer
- Herbert Snow (1847–1930), English surgeon and medical writer
- Herbert Spencer (disambiguation)
- Herbert M. St. Clair (1868–1949), American businessman and local politician
- Herbert St. John (1926–2011), American football player
- Herbert Stachowiak (1921–2004), German philosopher
- Herbert Stanley (1872–1955), British diplomat and colonial administrator
- Herbert Stein (1916–1999), American economist
- Herbert Stevens IV (born 1987), American hip-hop recording artist who records under the name "Ab-Soul"
- Herbert Stewart (1843–1885), British soldier
- Herbert L. Stone (1871–1955), American magazine editor and sailor
- Herbert Stothart (1885–1949), American composer
- Herbert Strabel (1927–2017), German production designer
- Herbert Strang, joint pseudonym of two English writers
- Herbert Streicher (1947–2013), also known as Harry Reems, American pornographic actor
- Herbert Strong (disambiguation)
- Bert Strudwick (1880–1970), English cricketer
- Herbert Stuart (disambiguation)
- Herbert Studd (1870–1947), English cricketer and soldier
- Herbert Sukopp (1930–2026), German ecologist and academic
- Herbert Sumsion (1889–1995), English organist and composer
- Herbert Sutcliffe (1894–1978), English cricketer

=== T ===
- Herbert Tabor (1918–2020), American biochemist and physician
- Herbert Tannenbaum (1892–1958), German-American art dealer and film theorist
- Herbert Tarr (1929–1993), American Jewish novelist and humorist
- Herbert Taylor (disambiguation)
- Herbert Tennekoon (1911–1979), Governor of the Central Bank of Sri Lanka from 1971 to 1979
- Herbert Thambiah (1926–1992), 39th chief justice of Sri Lanka
- Herbert Thoms (1885–1972), obstetrician gynecologist, and early advocate for natural childbirth and birth control
- Herbert Thorndike (1598–1672), English academic and clergyman
- Herbert Thurston (1856–1939), English priest and theologian
- Herbert Beerbohm Tree (1852–1917), English actor and theatre manager
- Herbert Trench (1865–1923), Irish poet
- Herbert Trube (1886–1959), American runner

=== U ===
- Herbert Uber (1885–1969), English badminton player
- Herbert Ulrich (1921–2002), Austrian ice hockey player
- Herbert Urlacher (1931–2023), American politician
- Herbert Ushewokunze, Zimbabwean politician

=== V ===
- Herbert J. Valentine (1917–1996), American Marine flying ace, Navy Cross recipient
- Herbert Vanderhoof (1875–1921), Canadian advertising executive
- Herbert Vaughan (1832–1903), English Catholic prelate
- Herbert Vesely (1931–2002), Austrian film director
- Herbert Vivian (1865–1940), English journalist and writer
- Herbert Voelcker (1930–2020), American sports shooter
- Herbert Voelker, American architect
- Herbert Vogel (1922–2012), American art collector
- Herbert Volney (1953–2022), Trinidad and Tobago politician

=== W ===
- Herbert Waas (born 1963), German footballer
- Herbert Wace (1851–1906), British colonial administrator
- Herbert Wachtell (born 1932), American lawyer
- Herbert Wachter (born 1940), Austrian cross-country skier
- Herbert Waddell (1902–1988), British rugby union footballer
- Herbert Wade (disambiguation)
- Herbert Wadsack (1912–2004), Austrian librarian and writer
- Herbert Wagner (disambiguation)
- Herbert Waite (1928–2007), American businessman and politician
- H. Russell Wakefield (1888–1964), English writer and civil servant
- Herbert Walker (disambiguation)
- Herbert J. Wallenstein (1917–1996), American lawyer
- Herbert Walther (1935–2006), German physicist
- Herbert Waniek (1897–1949), Austrian stage actor, theatrical producer, and impresario
- Herbert Warburton (1916–1983), American politician
- Herbert Ward (disambiguation)
- Herbert Wareing (1857–1918), English organist and composer
- Herbert Warnke (1902–1975), East German trade unionist and politician
- Herbert Warren (1853–1930), British academic
- Herbert P. Wasgatt (1865–1934), American politician and shoe manufacturer
- Herbert Furnivall Waterhouse (1864–1931), English surgeon and lecturer
- Herbert Watkins-Pitchford (1868–1951), British veterinarian
- Herbert Watney (1843–1932), English physician, landowner, and philanthropist
- Herbert Watts (1858–1934), British Army lieutenant-general
- Herbert Webb (1913–1947), English cricketer
- Herbert Webbe (1856–1886), English cricketer
- Herbert John Webber (1865–1946), American plant physiologist
- Herbert Wechsler (1909–2000), American legal scholar
- Herbert William Weekes (1841–1914), English painter
- Herbert Weerasinghe, Inspector-General of Sri Lanka Police in 1985
- Herbert Wehner (1906–1990), German politician
- Herbert Weichert (born 1937), German sailor
- Herbert Weichmann (1896–1983), German lawyer and politician
- Herbert Weiner (1919–2013), American rabbi
- Herbert Weinstock (1905–1971), American writer
- Herbert Weiss (born 1954), American journalist
- Herbert Weißbach (1901–1995), German actor
- Herbert Weissbach (biochemist) (born 1932), German biochemist
- Herbert Weiz (1924–2023), East German politician
- H. G. Wells (1866–1946), British writer, best remembered for his science fiction novels
- Herbert Welsh (1851–1941), American political reformer
- Herbert Wenyon (1888–1944), English cricketer
- Herbert Wenz (1928–2017), German football manager
- Herbert Werner (1920–2013), German naval officer
- Herbert Wernicke (1946–2002), German set and costume designer and opera director
- Herbert Wertheim (born 1939), American businessman
- Herbert Westbrook (died 1959), British-American writer
- Herbert Westermark (1891–1981), Swedish physician and sailor
- Herbert Westfaling (1531/2–1602), English bishop and academic administrator
- Herbert Westmacott (1952–1980), British Army officer
- Bert Whalley (1913–1958), English footballer and coach
- Herbert Whately (1876–1947), Anglican priest
- Herbert White (disambiguation)
- Herbert Whitfeld (1858–1909), English footballer and cricketer
- Herbert Whitley (1886–1955), British zookeeper
- Herbert Whittall (disambiguation)
- Herbert Wigwe (1966–2024), Nigerian accountant and banker
- Herbert Wilcox (1890–1977), British film producer and director
- Herbert Wiles, English rugby league player
- Herbert Wilf (1931–2012), American mathematician
- Herbert Wilk (1905–1977), German actor
- Herbert L. Wilkerson (1919–2021), United States Marine Corps major general
- Herbert P. Wilkins (born 1930), American judge
- Herb Wilkinson (1923–2026), American basketball player
- Herbert Willi (born 1956), Austrian composer
- Herbert Willing (1878–1943), Dutch football referee
- Herbert Wilson (disambiguation)
- Herbert Wimmer (born 1944), German footballer
- Herbert Warren Wind (1916–2005), American sportswriter
- Herbert Windsor, 2nd Viscount Windsor (1707–1758), British landowner and politician
- Herbert Windsor Mumford I (1871–1938), American educator
- Herbert Windt (1894–1965), German composer
- Herbert Winful (born 1952), Ghanaian-American engineering professor
- Herbert Eustis Winlock (1884–1950), American Egyptologist and archaeologist
- Herbert Wise (1924–2015), Austrian-born film and TV producer and director
- Herbert Wohlfarth (1915–1982), German World War II U-boat commander
- Herbert Wollmann (born 1951), German politician
- Herbert Womersley (1889–1962), English entomologist active in Australia
- Herbert Wood (disambiguation)
- Herbert Woodbury (1745–1809), American privateer
- Herbert Woodhill (1875–1963), Australian rugby league footballer
- Herbert Woodrow (1883–1974), American psychologist
- Herbert Woods (1891–1954), English boat builder and mooring developer
- Herbert Woodson (1925–2018), American engineer
- Herbert Wookey (1888–1953), Canadian cricketer
- Herbert M. Woolf (1880–1964), American businessman and racehorse owner
- Herbert Wragg (1880–1956), British politician
- Herbert Wright (disambiguation)
- Herbert Wunsch (1917–1970), Austrian table tennis player
- Herbert Wursthorn (born 1957), German middle-distance runner
- Herbert "Bert" Wynn, English trade unionist

=== X ===
- Herbert Xu, developer of the Debian Almquist shell

=== Y ===
- Herbert Yardley (1889–1958), American cryptozoologist
- Herbert J. Yates (1880–1966), American film studio executive
- Herbert Yeates (1879–1945), Australian politician
- Gerbert Yefremov (sometimes spelled Herbert) (born 1933), Russian weapons designer
- Herbert Yelland (1878–1962), Australian politician
- Herbert York (1921–2009), American nuclear physicist
- Herbert Yost (1879–1945), American actor
- Herbert Youtie (1904–1980), American papyrologist

=== Z ===
- Herbert Zangs (1924–2003), German artist
- Herbert Ziegenhahn (1921–1993), German politician
- Belu Zilber (born Herbert Zilber; 1901–1978), Romanian communist activist
- Herbert Zimmermann (disambiguation)
- Herbert Zipper (1904–1997), Austrian-born American composer, conductor and arts activist

== Fictional characters ==
- Herbert (Disney character), a friend of Huey, Dewey, and Louie Duck in Disney comics
- Herbert P. Bear, an antagonist in Club Penguin
- Herbert Garrison, in the television series South Park
- Herbert Pocket, in the Charles Dickens novel Great Expectations
- Herbert West, in H. P. Lovecraft's short story "Herbert West: Reanimator" and the films based on it

== See also ==
- Herbert (disambiguation)
- Herbert (surname)
- Aribert
- Hébert (disambiguation)
- Herb (given name)
- Herbart
- Herberts (disambiguation)
- Hubert (disambiguation)
- Robert
