= John Burton (sportsman) =

New Zealand cricketer

Personal information
- Full name: John Edward Ledgard Burton
- Born: 15 February 1925; Auckland, New Zealand
- Died: 11 May 2010 (aged 85); Auckland, New Zealand
- Batting: Right-handed
- Role: Batsman
- Relatives: Herbert Burton (father); Herbert Burton Sr. (grandfather)
- Source: Cricinfo, 9 March 2017

John Edward Ledgard Burton (15 February 1925 – 11 May 2010) was a New Zealand cricketer. He played one first-class match for Wellington in 1946–47 and three for Ceylon on their tour of Pakistan in 1949–50. He also represented Ceylon at rugby union against the visiting British team in 1950.

Burton was educated at Auckland Grammar School. His father and grandfather played first-class cricket in New Zealand. His son David named his coffee company "Jack's Coffee" after Burton.

Burton went to Ceylon in 1949 to study the tea business. Success in club cricket led to his selection for the Ceylon team on its tour of Pakistan in 1949–50. He returned to New Zealand in 1950.

== See also ==
- List of Wellington representative cricketers
