= Herbert Hill =

Herbert Hill may refer to:

- Herbert Hill (basketball) (born 1984), American basketball player
- Herbert Hill (baseball) (1891–1970), baseball player
- Herbert Hill (footballer) (1887–1955), Australian footballer
- Herbert Hill (labor director) (1924–2004), labor director of the National Association for the Advancement of Colored People
- Herbert Hill (cricketer), English cricketer
