= Huberta =

Huberta may refer to:

- Huberta (hippopotamus), South African hippopotamus
- 260 Huberta, asteroid

== See also ==
- Hubert, a name
- Hubertine
- Hubert (disambiguation)
