= Heribert =

Heribert is a Germanic given name, derived from hari ("host") and beraht ("bright"). See also Herbert, another given name with the same roots.

- Charibert of Laon (died before 762), also spelled Heribert, Count of Laon and maternal grandfather of Charlemagne
- Heribert of Cologne (c. 970-1021), saint, Archbishop of Cologne and Chancellor of Holy Roman Emperor Otto III
- Heribert Aribert (archbishop of Milan) (died 1045)
- Heribert Adam (born 1936), German-born Canadian political scientist and sociologist
- Heribert Barrera (1917–2011), Catalan chemist and politician
- Heribert Beissel (1933–2021), German orchestra conductor
- Heribert Bruchhagen (born 1948), German football player, manager and executive
- Heribert Faßbender (born 1941), German sports journalist
- Heribert Hirte (born 1958) German legal scholar and politician
- Heribert Illig (born 1947), German germanist and author
- Herbert von Karajan (1908-1989), Austrian orchestra and opera conductor born Heribert, Ritter von Karajan
- Heribert von Larisch (1894–1972), German lieutenant-general during World War II
- Heribert Macherey (born 1954), German retired football goalkeeper
- Heribert Mühlen (1927-2006), German Roman Catholic theologian
- Heribert Offermanns (born 1937), German chemist
- Heribert Prantl (born 1953), German journalist and jurist
- Heribert Rech (born 1950), German lawyer and politician
- Heribert Sperner (1915-1943), Austrian footballer
- Heribert Rosweyde (1569-1629), Jesuit hagiographer
- Heribert Weber (born 1955), Austrian retired football player and manager

Surname

- Sandy Heribert, French-British TV journalist

== See also ==
- Aribert
