= Bert (name) =

- Pronunciation: /bɜːt/
- Gender: Unisex
- Language: English

Origin
- Languages: 1. Germanic; 2. English
- Origin: Diminutive form of names ending in -bert
- Region of origin: Germanic

Other names
- Alternative spelling: Bertie; Burt
- Related names: Albert, Hubert, Herbert, Gilbert, Robert, Bertram

Bert is a hypocoristic form of a number of various Germanic given names, such as Robert, Albert, Herbert, Hubert, Gilbert, Bertram, and similar names ending in -bert.

There is a large number of Germanic names ending in -bert, second in number only to those ending in -wolf (-olf, -ulf). Most of these names are early medieval and only a comparatively small fraction remains in modern use.

The element -berht has the meaning of "bright", Old English beorht/berht, Old High German beraht/bereht, ultimately from a Common Germanic *berhtaz, from a PIE root *bhereg- "white, bright". The female hypocoristic of names containing the same element is Berta.

Modern English bright itself has the same etymology, but it underwent metathesis at an early date, already in the Old English period, attested as early as AD 700 in the Lindisfarne Gospels. The unmetathesized form disappears after AD 1000 and Middle English from about 1200 has briht universally.

== Names containing berht ==
There is no evidence of the berht element in Germanic personal names prior to the 6th century. It is mostly unknown in names of Goths, Vandals, Frisians or Norse, and only rarely occurs in names of Saxons. By contrast, it is very common among Anglo-Saxons, Lombards, Franks and Bavarians. The popularity of the element in certain areas may be related to religion, similar to the wolf element being due to the worship of Wodanaz, the names with berht can be considered theophoric, in connection with the goddess Perchta. The full form of Old High German beraht is reduced in two ways, by omission of either the second (berht, perht, pert) or the first vowel (braht, praht, brat, prat, brecht). Early attestations of such names include Ethberictus, Garberictus, and Transberictus mentioned in Hontheim's Historia Trevirensis s. a. 699. Pardessus' Diplomata s. a. 745 has Berdbert as a rare example of a reduplicated Germanic name. Förstemann counts 369 names with final -bert(a), of which 61 are feminine.

Given names that remain in modern use include:

1. names with -bert as final element
  - Albert/Æthelberht, Cuthbert, Dagobert, Elbert, Egbert, Engelbert, Filbert, Gerbert, Gilbert, Harbert, Herbert, Hubert, Humbert, Norbert, Robert, Tolbert, Wilbert
2. names with Bert- as first element
  - Bertram, Berthold, Bertrand

== Names abbreviated "Bert" ==
The following names are commonly abbreviated as "Bert":

- Albert/Adalbert (Æthelbert)
- Berthold/Bertold
- Bertrand/Bertram
- Colbert
- Gilbert
- Heribert/Herbert
- Hubert
- Lambert
- Norbert
- Robert
- Cumbert

== People called Bert ==
- Bert Abbey (1869–1962), American baseball player
- Bert Acosta (1895–1954), American aviator
- Bert Adams (1891–1940), American baseball player
- Bert Adams (politician) (1916–2003), American politician
- Bert Addinall (1921–2005), English professional footballer
- Bert Anciaux (born 1959), Belgian politician and founder and former member of Spirit (later known as the Social Liberal Party, or SLP)
- Bert Assirati (1908–1990), English professional wrestler
- Bert Auburn, American football player
- Bert Bell (1895–1959), National Football League commissioner
- Bert Berns (1929–1967), American songwriter and record producer in the 1960s
- Bert Blyleven (Aalbert) (born 1951), Dutch-born American baseball player
- Bert Bos (Gijsbert) (born 1963), Dutch computer scientist working for W3C
- Bert Brown, (1938–2018), Canadian politician
- Bert Carpelan (1895–1981), Swedish Army officer
- Bert Chen, Canadian politician
- Bert Convy (Bernard) (1933–1991), American singer, actor and game show host
- Bert Cunningham (1865–1952), American baseball player
- Bert Glover (Cyrus Herbert), Australian rules footballer
- Bert I. Gordon (1922–2023), American film director and screenwriter
- Bert Haanstra (Albert) (1916–1997), Dutch film director
- Bert Hargrave (Herbert) (1917–1996), Canadian politician
- Bert Hodge Hill (1874–1958), American archeologist
- Bert Kaempfert (Bertolt) (1923–1980), German orchestra leader
- Bert Koenders (Albert) (born 1958), Dutch politician
- Bert Kreischer, (born 1972), American comedian
- Bert Laeyendecker (1930–2020), Dutch sociologist
- Bert Lahr (1895–1967), American actor and comedian
- Bert McCracken (Robert) (born 1982), American lead singer of alternative band The Used
- Bert van Marwijk (Lambertus) (born 1952), Dutch football player and coach
- Bert Newton (Albert) (1938–2021), Australian entertainer and media personality
- Bert Nievera (1936–2018), Filipino-American singer
- Bert Ormond (1931–2017), New Zealand footballer
- Bert Parks (1914–1992), American actor, singer, host of Miss America from 1955 to 1979
- Bert Peletier (1937–2023), Dutch mathematician
- Bert Peters (composer) (18??–19??), American composer
- Bert Peters (1908–1944), Australian rules footballer
- Bert Sakmann (Bertold) (born 1942), German cell biologist, winner of the 1991 Nobel Prize for Medicine
- Bert Schneider (1897–1986), Canadian Olympic champion welterweight boxer
- Bert Stenfeldt (1933–2023), Swedish Air Force major general
- Bert Trautmann (Bernhard) (1923–2013), German football player
- Bert Vaux (born 1968), American linguist
- Bert Vogelstein (born 1949), American cancer researcher
- Bert Weckhuysen (born 1968), Belgian chemist
- Bert Wheeler (1895–1968), American comedian
- Bert Williams (1874–1922), Bahamian-born American entertainer
- Bert Williams (footballer, born 1920), England football player
- Bert Wipiti (1922–1943), New Zealand fighter pilot

== As a surname ==
- Bert (surname)

== Fictional characters ==
- Bert (Sesame Street), a Muppet character (of Bert and Ernie) on the children's television show Sesame Street
- Bert Ljung, a fictional character in the Bert diaries
- Bert (Mary Poppins), a Cockney chimney sweep in the book series and Disney film Mary Poppins. Played in the film by Dick Van Dyke
- Bert Raccoon, a lead character in TV series The Raccoons
- Bertie Pollock, a child in the 44 Scotland Street series of novels by Alexander McCall Smith
- Bertie Wooster, a gentlemen attended by Jeeves in the comedies of P. G. Wodehouse
- In Thomas & Friends there are 14 Berts

== See also ==
- Bart (disambiguation)
- Bert (disambiguation)
- Berth (disambiguation)
- Birt (disambiguation)
- Burt (disambiguation)
- Bertie (given name)
- Bertie (nickname)
