= Bert Jackson =

Bert Jackson may refer to:

- Bert Jackson (baseball) (Bozo Jackson), American baseball player of the 1930s and 1940s
- Bertram Jackson (1882–1940), English footballer
- Bert Jackson, candidate in Meadow Lake (electoral district)
- Bert Jackson, character in Blackout played by Alex Paez
- Bert Jackson, character in Take Me High
- Bert Jackson, character in Below the Sea, played by Paul Page (actor)

== See also ==
- Albert Jackson (disambiguation)
- Robert Jackson (disambiguation)
- Herbert Jackson (disambiguation)
- Hubert Jackson, boxer, opponent of Marlon Starling
