= Herbert Cohen =

Herbert Cohen may refer to:

- Herbert B. Cohen (1900–1970), American judge
- Herbert L. Cohen (died 1983), American lawyer and politician from Connecticut
- Herbert Cohen (fencer) (born 1940), American Olympic fencer
- Sir Herbert Cohen, 2nd Baronet of the Cohen baronets
- Herb Cohen (1932–2010), American music manager and record company executive
- Herb Cohen (negotiator) (born 1933), American negotiation expert

== See also ==
- Cohen (surname)
