= Herbert Parsons =

Herbert Parsons may refer to:

- Sir Herbert Parsons, 1st Baronet (1870–1940), British businessman and politician
- Herbert Parsons (New York politician) (1869–1925), Republican representative
- Herbert Angas Parsons (1872–1945), South Australian lawyer, politician and judge
- Herbert Parsons (cricketer) (1875–1937), Australian cricket player for Victoria

== See also ==
- John Herbert Parsons (1863–1957), British ophthalmologist
