= Herbert Burton Sr. =

New Zealand cricketer

Personal information
- Full name: Herbert George Edward Ledgard Burton
- Born: 1864; Yorkshire, England
- Died: 28 May 1910 (aged 45–46); Wellington, New Zealand
- Batting: Right-handed

Domestic team information
- Years: Team
- 1893/94–1897/98: Wellington
- Source: Cricinfo, 23 October 2020

Herbert George Edward Ledgard Burton (1864 – 28 May 1910) was a New Zealand cricketer. He played in seven first-class matches for Wellington from 1893 to 1898. His son Herbert and grandson John also played first-class cricket for Wellington.
