= Herbert Spencer (disambiguation) =

Herbert Spencer (1820–1903) was an English philosopher, biologist and sociologist.

Herbert Spencer may also refer to:

- Herbert Spencer (graphic designer) (1924–2002), British graphic designer
- Herbert Harvey Spencer (1869–1926), English stuff manufacturer and Liberal Party politician
- Herbert W. Spencer (1905–1992), American film and television composer and orchestrator
- Herbert Lincoln Spencer (1894–1960), president of Bucknell University, 1945–49
- Herbert R. Spencer (1860–1941), professor of obstetric medicine
- Herbert Spencer Elementary School, in New Westminster, British Columbia, Canada
