= Hubert (disambiguation) =

Hubert is a given name and a surname.

Hubert may also refer to:

== Locations ==
- Hubert, Kentucky
- Hubert, North Carolina

== Other uses ==
- Hubert (video game), 2026
- "Hubert", an episode of The Good Doctor

== See also ==
- Saint-Hubert (disambiguation)
- Hubert-Folie, France
