= Rosedale Apartments =

- U.S. National Register of Historic Places
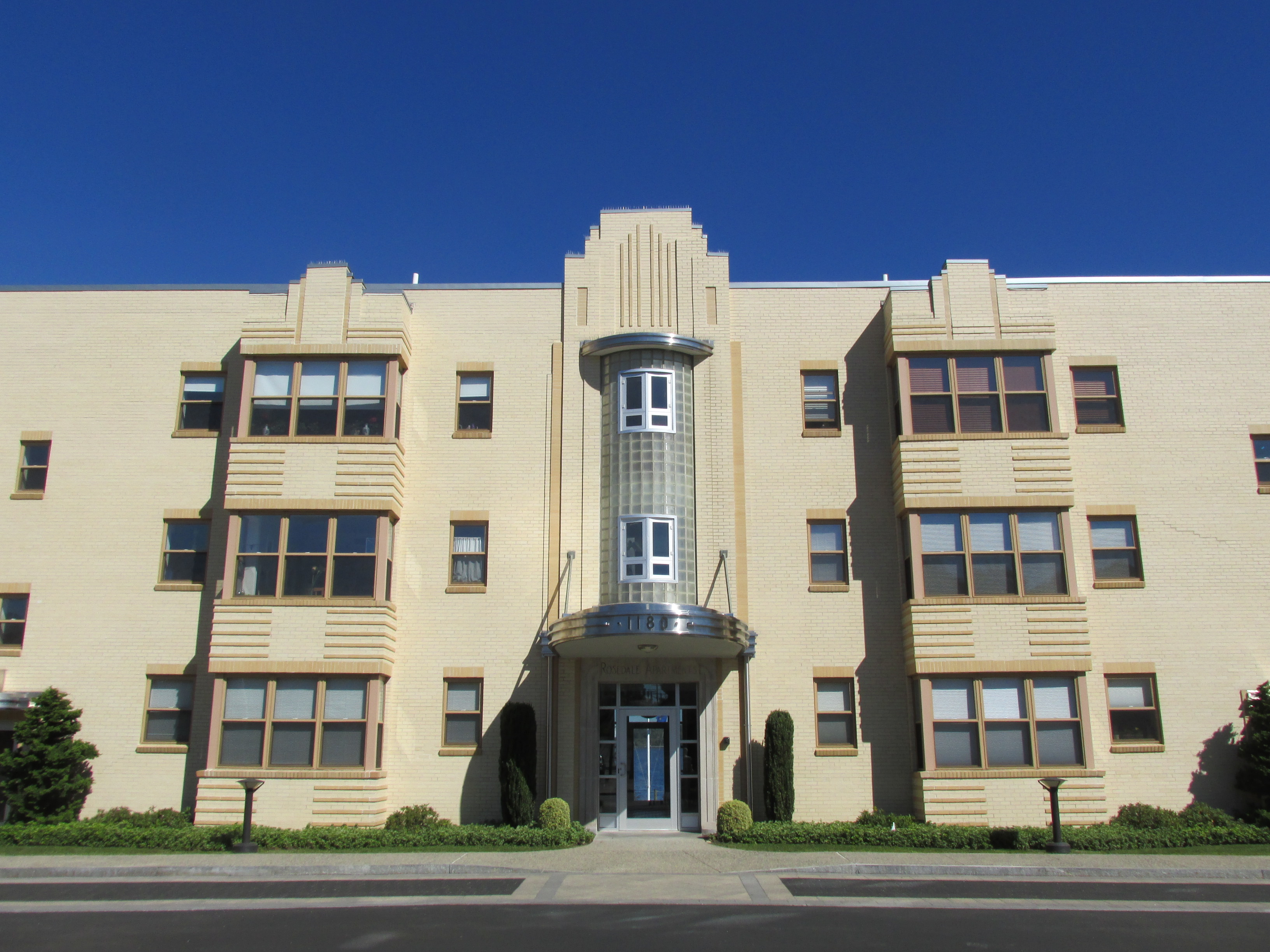
- Rosedale Apartments

- Location within Rhode Island Location within the United States
- Location: 1180 Narragansett Blvd., Cranston, Rhode Island
- Coordinates: 41°46′57″N 71°23′34″W
- Area: 2.7 acres (1.1 ha)
- Built: 1939
- Architect: Herbert R. Hunt
- Architectural style: Moderne
- NRHP reference No.: 07000301
- Added to NRHP: April 10, 2007

Rosedale Apartments are a historic apartment house at 1180 Narragansett Boulevard in Cranston, Rhode Island. This U-shaped apartment block stands overlooking Narragansett Bay, with three stories facing the street and four toward the bay. The Art Moderne structure was designed by Herbert R. Hunt and built in 1939–40. It is a rare statewide example of a large-scale building in this style, and was one of only a few built in Cranston before the Second World War.

The building was listed on the National Register of Historic Places in 2007.

== See also ==
- National Register of Historic Places listings in Providence County, Rhode Island
