= Albert Jackson =

Albert Jackson may refer to:

- Brian Jackson (cricketer) (Albert Brian Jackson, born 1933), former English cricketer
- Albert Bruce Jackson (1876–1947), British botanist and dendrologist
- Albert Jackson (mail carrier) (1857–1918), first Black Canadian mail carrier in Toronto
- Albert Jackson (footballer) (1943–2014), English footballer
- Albert Jackson, fictional character in Fat Albert and the Cosby Kids

== See also ==
- Bert Jackson (disambiguation)
