= Herbert Hill (cricketer) =

English cricketer

Personal information
- Full name: Herbert James Hill
- Born: 12 February 1867; Kingston upon Thames, Surrey, England
- Died: 27 February 1946 (aged 79); Sheringham, Norfolk, England
- Batting: Right-handed
- Relatives: William Law (brother-in-law)

Domestic team information
- Years: Team
- 1895–1903: Hertfordshire
- 1900–1901: Marylebone Cricket Club

Career statistics
Competition	First-class
Matches	2
Runs scored	90
Batting average	22.50
100s/50s	–/1
Top score	54
Catches/stumpings	–/–
- Source: Cricinfo, 4 July 2019

Herbert James Hill (12 February 1867 – 27 February 1946) was an English first-class cricketer.

Hill was born at Kingston upon Thames in February 1867. He made his debut in minor counties cricket for Hertfordshire in the 1895 Minor Counties Championship. He made two appearances in first-class cricket for the Marylebone Cricket Club, playing against London County at Crystal Palace in 1900 and Oxford University at Lord's in 1901. He scored 90 runs in his two first-class matches, with a high score of 54 against London County. He played minor counties cricket for Hertfordshire until 1903, making a total of 42 appearances in the Minor Counties Championship. By profession he was a stockbroker. Hill died in February 1946 at Sheringham, Norfolk. His brother-in-law, William Law, was also a first-class cricketer.
