= Aribert =

Aribert (Italian: Ariberto) is a Germanic given name, from hari ("host") and beraht ("bright"). Notable people with the given name include:

- Aribert (archbishop of Milan) (between 970 and 980–1045), archbishop of Milan
- Prince Aribert of Anhalt (1866–1933), regent of Anhalt
- Aribert Heim (1914–1992), Austrian Schutzstaffel (SS) doctor, also known as Dr. Death and Butcher of Mauthausen
- Aribert Heymann (1898–1946), German field hockey player
- Aribert Mog (1904–1941), German actor
- Aribert Reimann (1936–2024), German composer, pianist and accompanist
- Aribert Wäscher (1895–1961), German actor

== See also ==
- Herbert (given name)
