= Hubertine =

Hubertine (or Huberta or Hubertina) is a feminine given name based on the masculine named Hubert. Notable people who have or had this name include:

- Hubertine Auclert (1848–1914), French feminist and suffragist
- Cornelia Hubertina Doff (1858–1942), Dutch writer, known as Neel Doff
- Hubertine Heijermans (1936–2022), Dutch artist
- Hubertina D. Hogan (1924–2017), American chemist
- Huberta von Bronsart (1892–1978), German scientist
- Hubertina Petronella Maria Vriesekoop (born 1951), Dutch table tennis player known as Bettine Vriesekoop

== See also ==
- Hubert
- Huberta
- Saint Hubertus
