= Herbert Hunt =

Herbert Hunt may refer to:

- Herbert Hunt (translator) (1899–1973), English academic, author and translator
- Herbert Hunt (cricketer), New Zealand cricketer
- Herbert Hunt (footballer) (1880–1936), English footballer
- Herbert R. Hunt (1885–1961), American architect
