= Herbert Wenz =

German football manager (1928–2017)

Personal information
- Date of birth: 24 June 1928
- Date of death: 10 July 2017 (aged 89)

Managerial career
- Years: Team
- 1965–1967: SV Röchling Völklingen
- 1971–1973: FC Bayern Hof
- 1974: FC Homburg
- 1975–1976: Eintracht Bad Kreuznach
- 1976–1977: FV Würzburg 04
- 1977–1978?: SSV Reutligen
- 1979–1980: MTV Ingolstadt

Herbert Wenz (24 June 1928 – 10 July 2017) was a German football manager. Wenz died on 10 July 2017, at the age of 89.
