= Herbert Blake =

English footballer

Personal information
- Full name: Herbert Edwin Blake
- Date of birth: 26 August 1894
- Place of birth: Bristol, England
- Date of death: 1958 (aged 63–64)
- Height: 5 ft 10 in (1.78 m)
- Position: Goalkeeper

Senior career*
Years	Team	Apps	(Gls)
1914–?	Bristol City	1	
- Mid Rhondda
1921–1923	Tottenham Hotspur	51	
- Kettering Town
- * Club domestic league appearances and goals

Herbert Blake (26 August 1894 – 1958) was a professional footballer who played for Bristol City, Tottenham Hotspur and Kettering Town.

== Career ==
Blake began his career at the non-League club Fishponds before joining Bristol City in 1914 where he played a solitary match. In 1919 the goalkeeper had a trial at Preston North End. Blake moved on to Welsh Southern League club Mid-Rhondda before joining Tottenham Hotspur where he went on to appear in 56 matches in all competitions between 1921 and 1923. He ended his career at Kettering Town.

== Personal life ==
Blake's nephew Bert Blake also became a professional footballer. He served in the British Armed Forces during the First World War.
