= Herbert Fritz =

- Born: 27 October 1916; Dusseldorf
- Died: 11 October 1996 (aged 79)
- Military career
- Allegiance: Nazi Germany; West Germany
- Rank: Brigadegeneral
- Conflicts: World War II
- Awards: Knight's Cross of the Iron Cross
- Other work: Police officer

Herbert Fritz (27 October 1916 – 11 October 1996) was a German general in the Bundeswehr. During World War II, he served as an officer in the Wehrmacht and was a recipient of the Knight's Cross of the Iron Cross of Nazi Germany.

== Awards and decorations ==
- German Cross in Gold on 14 February 1942 as Leutnant in the 4./MG-Gebirgsjäger-Regiment 13
- Knight's Cross of the Iron Cross on 17 March 1944 as Hauptmann and chief of the 16./Gebirgsjäger-Regiment 13
