= Herbert Wagner =

Herbert Wagner may refer to:

- Herbert A. Wagner (1900–1982), Austrian scientist and engineer
- Herbert Appleton Wagner, one of the founders of the Wagner Electric Corporation
- Herbert Wagner (politician) (born 1948), mayor of Dresden
- Herbert Wagner (physicist) (born 1935), German physicist
- Herbert Wagner (general) (1896–1968), Generalleutnant in the Wehrmacht during World War II

== See also ==
- Herb Wagner (1920–2000), American botanist
