= Herbert Stuart =

Herbert Stuart may refer to:

- Herbert Arthur Stuart (1899–1974), German experimental physicist
- Herbert Akroyd Stuart (1864–1927), English inventor
- Herbert Stuart (priest) (1924–2019), Anglican priest
