= Herbert Gouverneur Ogden =

American geographer (1846–1906)

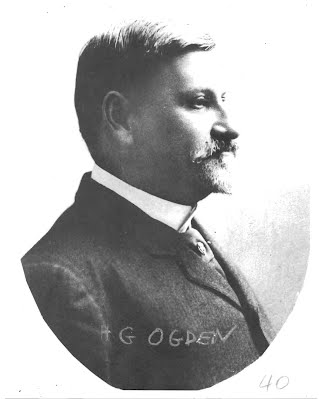
- Born: April 4, 1846; New York City, New York, U.S.
- Died: February 25, 1906 (aged 59); Hampton, Virginia, U.S.
- Resting place: Oak Hill Cemetery; Washington, D.C., U.S.
- Spouse: Mary A. Greene (m. 1872)
- Children: 4

Herbert Gouverneur Ogden (April 4, 1846 – February 25, 1906) was an American geographer, topographer, civil engineer, and cartographer.

== Early life ==
Herbert Gouverneur Ogden was born on April 4, 1846, in New York City to Eliza Glendy (née McLaughlin) and Morgan Lewis Ogden. He was educated in private schools and by private tutors.

== Career ==
On April 22, 1863, Ogden joined the United States Coast Survey as an aide. He originally worked on the defenses of Washington, D.C. during the American Civil War. The following year, he went to map the coast of North Carolina for the Union Navy. In 1865, he went on an expedition to Nicaragua, and in 1870 to Panama and the Darien. He was promoted to subassistant on January 1, 1869, and to assistant on January 1, 1872.

Ogden co-founded the National Geographic Society in 1888. In 1890 while at the United States Coast and Geodetic Survey, Ogden was named by President Benjamin Harrison in Executive Order No. 28 as a member of the newly created Board on Geographic Names, where he served under Thomas Mendenhall, the first chairman of the board on Geographic Names. In 1893 he mapped the Alaska-Canada border. He was a vice-president of the National Geographic Society. He served as the inspector of hydrography and topography at the U.S. Coast and Geodetic Survey from 1898 to his death.

== Personal life ==
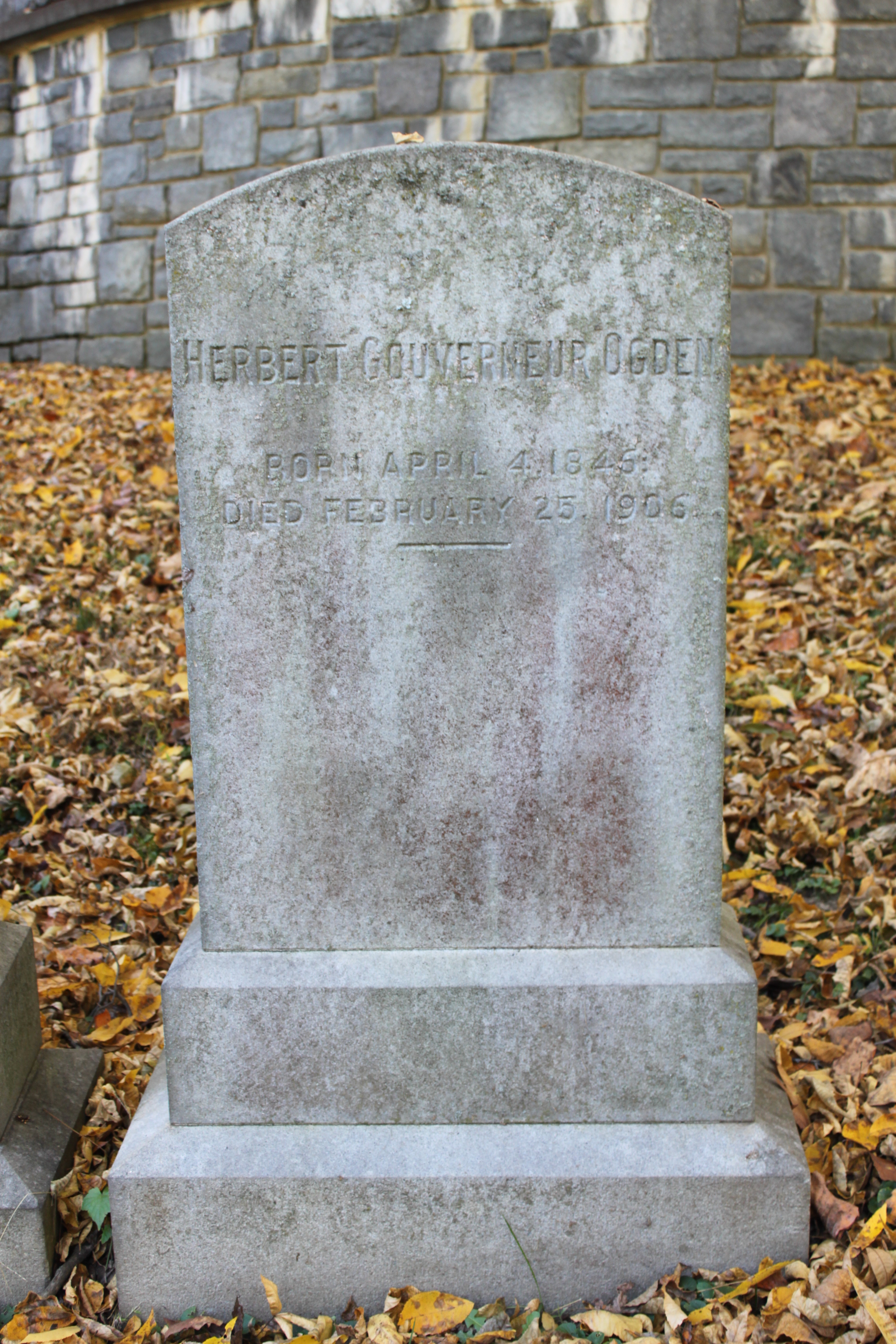
Grave of Ogden at Oak Hill Cemetery

Ogden married Mary A. Greene, of Brooklyn, on May 28, 1872. He had four children: Herbert G. Jr., Warren G., Mary A. and Joseph W.

Ogden died on February 25, 1906, at a hospital at Fort Monroe in Hampton, Virginia. He died from a stroke. His funeral was at St. John's Church and he was buried in Oak Hill Cemetery in Washington, D.C.

== Legacy ==
- Ogden Peak, a boundary peak of the Alaska–British Columbia border is named after Ogden.
- Ogden Passage, Alaska is named after Ogden.
