= Herbert Zimmermann =

Herbert Zimmermann may refer to:

- Herbert Zimmermann (football commentator) (1917–1966), German football commentator and Knight's Cross of the Iron Cross recipient
- Herbert Zimmermann (neuroscientist) (born 1944), German neuroscientist
- Herbert Zimmermann (footballer) (born 1954), German football player
