= Herbert Furnivall Waterhouse =

British Surgeon

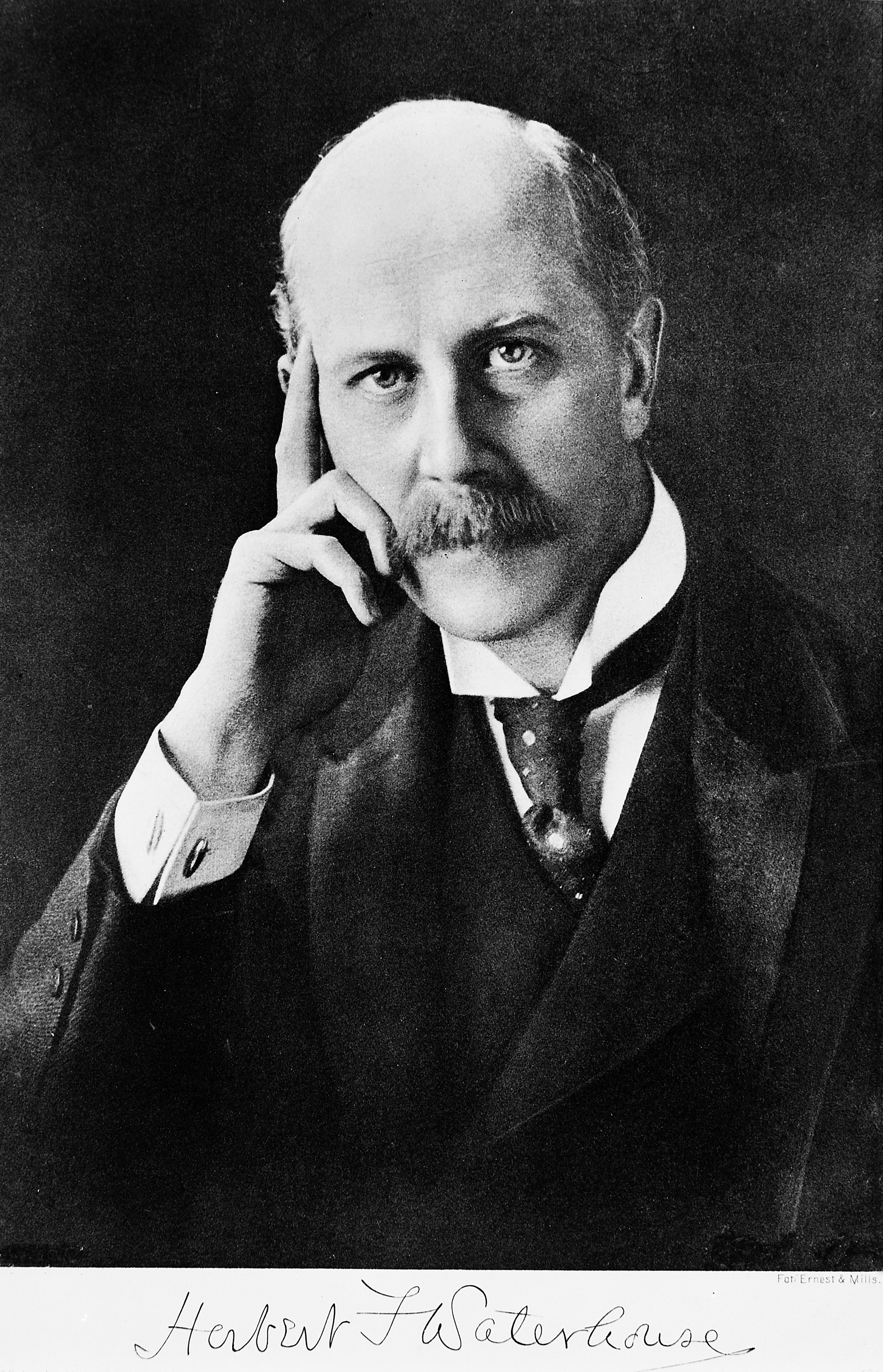
- Born: 1864; London, United Kingdom
- Died: 23 May 1931 (aged 66–67); London, United Kingdom
- Education: University of Edinburgh

Sir Herbert Furnivall Waterhouse (13 February 1864 - 23 May 1931) was a surgeon and lecturer in anatomy.

== Early life ==
Herbert Waterhouse, the fourth child of the Reverend Charles James Waterhouse, was born in London in 1864 and educated at Brighton College, East Sussex. He entered the University of Edinburgh as a medical student in 1882. In 1887 he graduated MB CM with distinction and in 1889 was awarded a gold medal for his MD thesis. While in Edinburgh, he served as a resident surgeon at the Edinburgh Royal Infirmary and as president of the Royal Medical Society.

== Career ==
During the First World War, he acted as principal surgeon in an Anglo-Russian hospital set up in Russia to help the army on the Eastern front. He received a knighthood in 1917 in recognition of his war services.

== Personal life ==
In 1892 he married Edith Florence, who died in 1929, and was survived by two daughters.

=== Death ===
Waterhouse died at his home in London on 23 May 1931.
