= Hubert, Kentucky =

Unincorporated community in Kentucky, United States

- Unincorporated community
- Location in Kentucky Location in the United States
- Coordinates: 37°3′10″N 82°59′17″W
- Country: United States
- State: Kentucky
- County: Letcher
- Elevation: 1,099 ft (335 m)
- Time zone: UTC-5 (Eastern (EST))
  - Summer (DST): UTC-4 (EDT)
- GNIS feature ID: 2336125

Hubert was an unincorporated community in Letcher County, Kentucky, United States.
