= Herbert Newman =

English cricketer

Herbert James Newman (20 April 1873 – unknown) was an English cricketer who played for Northamptonshire. He was born in Duston, Northamptonshire.

Newman made a single first-class appearance, during the 1905 season, the inaugural first-class year for Northamptonshire, against Surrey. From the tailend, he scored 5 runs in the first innings in which he batted, and a duck in the second innings. Northamptonshire lost the match by 9 wickets.
