= Herbert Numa =

Australian cricketer

Personal information
- Born: 22 June 1925; Melbourne, Australia
- Died: 17 April 1984 (aged 58); Melbourne, Australia

Domestic team information
- Years: Team
- 1946-1954: Victoria
- Source: Cricinfo, 29 November 2015

Herbert Numa (22 June 1925 – 17 April 1984) was an Australian cricketer. He played 16 first-class cricket matches for Victoria between 1946 and 1954.

== See also ==
- List of Victoria first-class cricketers
