= Herbert Raymer =

Herbert James Raymer (1874–1956) was the Dean of Nelson from 1933 to 1934.

Raymer was educated at the University of Cambridge and ordained in 1899. His first post was a curacy in Ossett. After this he served as: a missionary priest at St Cyprian, Durban; Secretary of the SPG for Yorkshire; Rector of Pittsworth, Queensland; and Chaplain at All Saints, Kobe. He then held incumbencies in Skelmanthorpe, Ovenden and Selly Oak until his appointment as Dean. Afterwards he was the Chaplain at Bromley College.

He died on 25 May 1956.
