= Herbert Perrott =

Herbert Perrott may refer to:

- Herbert Perrott (politician) (c. 1617–1683), member of parliament for Haverfordwest and Weobley
- Sir Herbert Perrott, 5th Baronet (1849–1922), Companion of Honour
