= Herbert Kuhl =

German gynecologist

- A photo of Kuhl taken from a 1999 paper
- Born: February 19, 1940; Aschaffenburg, Germany
- Died: June 25, 2024 (aged 84)
- Education: Goethe University Frankfurt: chemistry and biochemistry (1961–1967); doctorate in biochemistry and pharmacy (1972); postdoctoral qualification in human medicine for the subject of experimental endocrinology (1977)
- Occupations: Gynecologist; Medical researcher
- Years active: 1970–present
- Medical career
- Profession: Professor, physician
- Institutions: Department of Obstetrics and Gynecology, J. W. Goethe University of Frankfurt; Universitäts-Frauenklinik in Frankfurt
- Research: Gynecology

Herbert Kuhl (19 February 1940 – 25 June 2024) was a German gynecologist who published extensively in the areas of estrogens, progestogens, menopause, hormonal contraception, and menopausal hormone therapy. His works include numerous original and review articles and several books. Kuhl was a member of many medical societies and received various scientific awards.

Among Kuhl's most widely cited publications is his 2005 literature review in the journal Climacteric, Pharmacology of Estrogens and Progestogens: Influence of Different Routes of Administration. He published several articles interpreting the findings of the Women's Health Initiative (WHI) study.

Kuhl was born in Aschaffenburg, Germany in 1940. He was educated at the Goethe University Frankfurt from 1961 to 1977. Kuhl first published in 1970. From 1981, he was a professor at the Universitäts-Frauenklinik (University Women's Clinic) of the Goethe University Frankfurt. Until 2013, Kuhl continued to be affiliated with this institution. After that, he continued to publish occasionally but listed no affiliation in his publications except that he resided in Aschaffenburg, Germany. Kuhl died in 2024.

== Selected publications ==
=== Books ===
==== Authored books ====
- Kuhl, Herbert; Taubert, Hans-Dieter (1987). Das Klimakterium – Pathophysiologie, Klinik, Therapie [The Climacteric – Pathophysiology, Clinic, Therapy] (in German). Stuttgart, Germany: Thieme Verlag. ISBN 978-3137008019. OCLC 19780387. OL 31949169M. (1st and only edition)
- Hans-Dieter Taubert; Herbert Kuhl (1995). Kontrazeption mit Hormonen: ein Leitfaden für die Praxis [Hormonal Contraception: A Practical Guide] (in German) (2 ed.). Stuttgart, Germany: Thieme. ISBN 978-3-13-608802-9. OCLC 1068026728. (1st edition published in 1981)
- Herbert Kuhl; Claudia Jung-Hoffman (1999). Kontrazeption [Contraception] (in German) (2 ed.). Georg Thieme Verlag. ISBN 978-3131179920. OCLC 237359985. OL 12671120M. (1st edition published in 1996)
- Kuhl, Herbert; Wiegratz, Inka (1 January 2008). Klimakterium, Postmenopause und Hormonsubstitution [Climacteric, Postmenopause and Hormone Replacement] (in German) (4 ed.). UNI-MED-Verlag. ISBN 978-3-83742-043-2. OCLC 553736917. OL 31949179M. (Earlier editions published in 1999 (1st), 2001 (2nd), and 2005/2006 (3rd))
- Inka Wiegratz; Herbert Kuhl (2010). Langzyklus [Long Cycle] (in German). Georg Thieme Verlag. ISBN 978-3-13-153301-2. OCLC 649505497. (1st and only edition)

==== Edited books ====
- Taubert, Hans-Dieter; Kuhl, Herbert, eds. (1984). The Inadequate Luteal Phase: Pathophysiology, Diagnostics, Therapy [The Proceedings of the 7th Freiburg Colloquium, a Serono Workshop on Reproductive Medicine Held at Frieburg/Breisgau, September 1983]. Lancaster/Boston: MTP Press Limited. ISBN 978-94-015-7164-7. OCLC 60090529.
- Kuhl, Herbert, ed. (December 1990), "Pharmacokinetics of Oral Contraceptive Steroids and Drug Interaction: Salzburg, Austria, September 14-16, 1989", American Journal of Obstetrics and Gynecology, 163 (6 Part 2), St. Louis: Mosby-Year Book: 2113–2218, eISSN 1097-6868, ISSN 0002-9378, OCLC 83180966, OL 33197830M, PMID 1979469
- Kuhl, H.; Nikolov, R., eds. (1998). Re-evaluation of Contraceptive Steroids [XV FIGO World Congress of Gynaecology and Obstetrics, Copenhagen, Denmark, August 1997]. Bad Blankenburg: Harfe Verlag/Jenapharm. OCLC 722431314.
- Kuhl, Herbert; Braendle, Wilhelm; Breckwoldt, Meinert; Riecher-Rössler, Anita; Rohde, Anke (2002). Sexualhormone und Psyche: Grundlagen, Symptomatik, Erkrankungen, Therapie [Sex Hormones and Psyche: Fundamentals, Symptoms, Diseases, Therapy] (in German). Georg Thieme Verlag. doi:10.1055/b-002-19463. ISBN 9783131326218. OCLC 838442034.
- Braendle, W.; Dören, M.; Heitmann, C.; Kleinkauf-Houcken, A.; Kruse, H.-P.; Kuhl, H. (2005). Das Klimakterium: Endokrinologie, Pharmakologie der Hormone und Hormonsubstitution [The Climacteric: Endocrinology, Pharmacology of Hormones, and Hormone Substitution]. Edition Gynäkologie und Geburtsmedizin (in German). Vol. 12 (2 ed.). Stuttgart: Wissenschaftliche Verlagsgesellschaft. ISBN 978-3-8047-2063-3. ISSN 0945-0475. OCLC 254206136. (1st edition published in 2000)

=== Book chapters ===
- Kuhl, H (1998). "Adverse effects of estrogen treatment: natural vs. synthetic estrogens". In Lippert, T. H.; Mueck, A. O.; Ginsburg, J. (eds.). Sex Steroids and the Cardiovascular System: The Proceedings of the 1st Interdisciplinary Workshop, Tuebingen, Germany, October 1996. London/New York: Parthenon. pp. 201–210. ISBN 9781850709565.
- Kuhl, H. (1999). "Hormonal Contraception". In Oettel, M.; Schillinger, E. (eds.). Estrogens and Antiestrogens II: Pharmacology and Clinical Application of Estrogens and Antiestrogens. Handbook of Experimental Pharmacology. Vol. 135 / 2. Berlin/Heidelberg: Springer. pp. 363–407. doi:10.1007/978-3-642-60107-1_18. eISSN 1865-0325. ISBN 978-3-642-64261-6. ISSN 0171-2004.
- Kuhl, H (2001). "Pharmacology of Estrogens and Gestagens" (PDF). In Franz H. Fischl (ed.). Menopause - Andropause: Hormone Replacement Therapy Through the Ages (1 ed.). Gablitz: Gablitz Krause und Pachernegg. pp. 33–50. ISBN 978-3-901299-34-6. OCLC 181435602.

=== Journal articles ===
==== Reviews ====
- Kuhl H (December 1986). "Hormonsubstitution durch Injektionspräparate und Hautimplantate" [Hormone substitution by injectable preparations and skin implants]. Der Gynäkologe (in German). 19 (4): 241–247. PMID 3817596.
- Kuhl, H. (September 1990). "Pharmacokinetics of oestrogens and progestogens". Maturitas. 12 (3): 171–197. doi:10.1016/0378-5122(90)90003-O. ISSN 0378-5122. PMID 2170822.
- Kuhl, H. (December 1990). "Ovulationshemmer: Die Bedeutung der Östrogendosis" [Ovulation Preventives: The Significance of the Estrogen Dose]. Geburtshilfe und Frauenheilkunde (in German). 50 (12): 910–922. doi:10.1055/s-2008-1026392. eISSN 1438-8804. ISSN 0016-5751. PMID 2086334.
- Kuhl, Herbert (February 1996). "Comparative Pharmacology of Newer Progestogens". Drugs. 51 (2): 188–215. doi:10.2165/00003495-199651020-00002. ISSN 0012-6667. PMID 8808163. S2CID 1019532.
- Kuhl, Herbert (May 1996). "Effects of progestogens on haemostasis". Maturitas. 24 (1–2): 1–19. doi:10.1016/0378-5122(96)00994-2. ISSN 0378-5122. PMID 8794429.
- Kuhl, H. (18 April 1997). "Metabolische Effekte der Östrogene und Gestagene" [Metabolic effects of estrogens and progestogens]. Der Gynäkologe (in German). 30 (4): 357–369. doi:10.1007/PL00003042. ISSN 0017-5994. S2CID 43381309.
- Kuhl, H. (1998). "Pharmakologie von Sexualsteroiden" [Pharmacology of sex hormones]. Der Gynäkologe (in German). 31 (10): 832–847. doi:10.1007/s001290050341. ISSN 0017-5994. S2CID 20941492.
- Kuhl H (2000). "Pharmacology of estradiol and estriol". Menopause Review. 5. Société Européenne de Ménopause: 23–44. ISSN 1272-9868. OCLC 473540298.
- Kuhl H (2001). "Pharmacology of Progestogens. Basic aspects - progesterone derivatives". Menopause Review. 6 (1). Société Européenne de Ménopause: 9–16. ISSN 1272-9868. OCLC 473540298.
- Kuhl, H (August 2005). "Pharmacology of estrogens and progestogens: influence of different routes of administration" (PDF). Climacteric. 8 (Suppl 1): 3–63. doi:10.1080/13697130500148875. eISSN 1473-0804. ISSN 1369-7137. PMID 16112947. S2CID 24616324.
- Wiegratz, Inka; Kuhl, Herbert (January 2006). "Metabolic and clinical effects of progestogens". The European Journal of Contraception & Reproductive Health Care. 11 (3): 153–161. doi:10.1080/13625180600772741. eISSN 1473-0782. ISSN 1362-5187. PMID 17056444. S2CID 27088428.
- Kuhl H (2011). "Pharmacology of Progestogens". J Reproduktionsmed Endokrinol. 8 (1): 157–177.
- Kuhl, H.; Schneider, H. P. G. (20 February 2013). "Progesterone – promoter or inhibitor of breast cancer". Climacteric. 16 (Suppl 1): 54–68. doi:10.3109/13697137.2013.768806. eISSN 1473-0804. ISSN 1369-7137. PMID 23336704. S2CID 20808536.
- Kuhl, H.; Wiegratz, I. (1 February 2021). "Pharmakokinetik und Pharmakodynamik der in der assistierten Reproduktion verwendeten Gestagene" [Pharmacokinetics and pharmacodynamics of progestogens used in assisted reproduction]. Gynäkologische Endokrinologie (in German). 19 (2): 105–117. doi:10.1007/s10304-020-00372-5. eISSN 1610-2908. ISSN 1610-2894. S2CID 231744549.

==== Studies ====
- Wiegratz, I.; Jung-Hoffmann, C.; Kuhl, H. (June 1995). "Effect of two oral contraceptives containing ethinylestradiol and gestodene or norgestimate upon androgen parameters and serum binding proteins". Contraception. 51 (6): 341–346. doi:10.1016/0010-7824(95)00098-U. ISSN 0010-7824. PMID 7554973.
- Herkert, Olaf; Kuhl, Herbert; Sandow, Jurgen; Busse, Rudi; Schini-Kerth, Valérie B. (4 December 2001). "Sex Steroids Used in Hormonal Treatment Increase Vascular Procoagulant Activity by Inducing Thrombin Receptor (PAR-1) Expression". Circulation. 104 (23): 2826–2831. doi:10.1161/hc4801.099737. eISSN 1524-4539. ISSN 0009-7322. PMID 11733402.
- Wiegratz, I; Lee, J.H; Kutschera, E; Winkler, U.H; Kuhl, H (August 2004). "Effect of four oral contraceptives on hemostatic parameters". Contraception. 70 (2): 97–106. doi:10.1016/j.contraception.2004.03.004. ISSN 0010-7824. PMID 15288212.

=== Theses/dissertations ===
- Kuhl, Herbert (1972). Darstellung von Steroidverbindungen mit hormoneller Langzeitwirkung [Presentation of steroid compounds with long-lasting hormonal effects] (Thesis) (in German). Frankfurt/Main: Universität Frankfurt am Main. OCLC 715315797.
- Kuhl, Herbert (1977). Die Rolle eines LH-RH-abbauenden Enzyms im Hypothalamus und in der Hypophyse der Ratte bei der Regulation der Gonadotropin-Freisetzung [The role of an LH-RH degrading enzyme in the rat hypothalamus and pituitary gland in the regulation of gonadotropin release] (Thesis) (in German). Frankfurt (Main), Univ., Habil.-Schr. OCLC 720820331.
