= Herbert Hughes =

Herbert Hughes may refer to:

- Herbert Hughes (composer) (1882–1937), Irish composer, music critic and collector of folk songs
- Herbert Bristow Hughes (1821–1892), Australian pastoralist
- Herbert Delauney Hughes, known as Billy Hughes (educationist) (1914–1995), British Labour Party politician, MP and Principal of Ruskin College

== See also ==
- Herbert Hughes-Stanton, painter
