= Herbert Leaf =

English cricketer

Personal information
- Full name: Herbert Leaf
- Born: 10 October 1854; Norwood, Surrey, England
- Died: 13 February 1936 (aged 81); Marlborough, Wiltshire, England
- Batting: Right-handed

Domestic team information
- Years: Team
- 1877: Surrey
- 1876: Cambridge University

Career statistics
Competition	First-class
Matches	5
Runs scored	60
Batting average	8.57
100s/50s	–/–
Top score	18
Balls bowled	–
Wickets	–
Bowling average	–
5 wickets in innings	–
10 wickets in match	–
Best bowling	–
Catches/stumpings	3/–
- Source: Cricinfo, 30 April 2013

Herbert Leaf (10 October 1854 – 13 February 1936) was an English cricketer. Leaf was a right-handed batsman. He was born at Norwood, Surrey.

Educated at Harrow School, where he captained the school cricket team, and then at Trinity College, Cambridge, Leaf made his first-class debut for Cambridge University against Surrey at Fenner's in 1876. He made three further first-class appearances for Cambridge University in that season, against the Gentlemen of England, Surrey, and the Marylebone Cricket Club. Described in Wisden as a "sound batsman and a smart fieldsman", Leaf scored a total of 52 runs in his four matches for the University, at average of 10.40 and a high score of 18. In 1877, he made a single first-class appearance for Surrey against Cambridge University at Fenner's.

While studying at the University of Cambridge, Leaf played tennis for the university against the University of Oxford. He later taught at Marlborough College in Wiltshire, and was mayor of Marlborough in 1906. He died at Marlborough on 13 February 1936.

His brother was Sir Walter Leaf.
