= Herbert L. Cohen =

American politician (died 1983)

Member of the Connecticut House of Representatives from Fairfield
- In office 1933–1937 Serving with Finette B. Nichols
- Preceded by: Finette B. Nichols; J. Walter Perry
- Succeeded by: Finette B. Nichols; W. Eben Burr

Personal details
- Born: 1904 or 1905 Bridgeport, Connecticut, U.S.
- Died: September 22, 1983 (aged 78)
- Party: Republican
- Education: Yale College; Yale Law School

Herbert L. Cohen (1904 or 1905 – September 22, 1983) was an American lawyer and politician from Connecticut. A Republican, he represented the town of Fairfield in the Connecticut House of Representatives from 1933 to 1937.

== Personal life and education ==
Cohen was a native of Bridgeport, Connecticut. He was Jewish. He graduated from Yale College and Yale Law School, and he began practicing law in 1928. He was married to the pianist Ruth Steinkraus Cohen, who died in 2002. In later life, Cohen moved to Westport.

Cohen died on September 22, 1983, while visiting London. He was 78.

== Career ==
Following his graduation from Yale Law School, Cohen founded the law firm Cohen & Wolf.

Cohen was elected to the Connecticut House of Representatives in 1932, and he served two terms representing the town of Fairfield as a Republican. He served alongside Finette B. Nichols. He unsuccessfully ran for reelection in 1936.

Cohen served on several arts and cultural organizations, including the Fairfield County Symphony Society, the Friends of Music Inc., and the Connecticut Commission on the Arts, and was a trustee of several others, among them the University of Bridgeport and American Shakespeare Theatre. Cohen was director of the United Nations Association of the United States of America, and a founder of the University of Bridgeport Law School.
