= Herbert Wiles =

English rugby league player

Personal information
- Full name: Herbert Wiles

Playing information
Club
Years	Team	Pld	T	G	FG	P
1895–00	Hull FC
- As of 16 October 2010

Herbert Wiles was a professional rugby league footballer who played in the 1890s and 1900s. He played at club level for Hull F.C.
