= Herbert Hamblen =

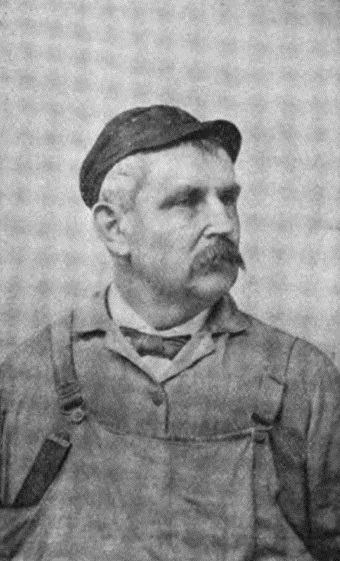
Herbert Hamblen.

Herbert Elliott Hamblen (December 24, 1849 – April 6, 1908) was an American author. He published his first novel under the name Frederick Benton Williams, but published his other work under his own name.

== Bibliography ==
=== As Frederick Benton Williams ===
- On Many Seas: The Life and Exploits of a Yankee Sailor, edited by William Stone Booth (1897; G. P. Putnam's Sons)

=== As Herbert Elliot Hamblen ===
- Tom Benton's luck (1898; Macmillan Publishers)
- The general manager's story; old-time reminiscences of railroading in the United States (1898; Macmillan Publishers; reprinted in 1970 by Gregg Press)
- The yarn of a bucko mate; his adventures in two oceans (1899; Charles Scribner's Sons)
- We win: the life and adventures of a young railroader (1899; Doubleday & McClure)
- The red-shirts : a romance of the old volunteer fire department (1902; Street & Smith)
