= Herbert Hull =

English cricketer

Personal information
- Full name: Herbert Richard Barnes Hull
- Born: 27 October 1886; Chippenham, Wiltshire, England
- Died: 31 May 1970 (aged 83); Westminster, London, England
- Batting: Unknown
- Bowling: Unknown

Career statistics
Competition	First-class
Matches	1
Runs scored	1
Batting average	–
100s/50s	–/–
Top score	1*
Balls bowled	72
Wickets	–
Bowling average	–
5 wickets in innings	–
10 wickets in match	–
Best bowling	–
Catches/stumpings	–/–
- Source: Cricinfo, 29 May 2019

Herbert Richard Barnes Hull (27 October 1886 – 31 May 1970) was an English first-class cricketer and Royal Navy officer.
