= Herbert Parsons (cricketer) =

Australian cricketer

Personal information
- Born: 21 May 1875; Melbourne, Australia
- Died: 30 December 1937 (aged 62); East Camberwell, Australia

Domestic team information
- Years: Team
- 1909-1911: Victoria
- Source: Cricinfo, 15 November 2015

Herbert Parsons (21 May 1875 – 20 December 1937) was an Australian cricketer. He played five first-class cricket matches for Victoria between 1909 and 1911.

== See also ==
- List of Victoria first-class cricketers
