= Bert Glover =

Australian rules footballer

Personal information
- Full name: Cyrus Herbert Glover
- Born: 18 March 1887; Geelong, Victoria
- Died: 27 February 1941 (aged 53); Geelong West, Victoria
- Height: 188 cm (6 ft 2 in)
- Weight: 81 kg (179 lb)

Playing career^{1}
Years	Club	Games (Goals)
1910	Geelong	1 (1)
- ^{1} Playing statistics correct to the end of 1910.

Cyrus Herbert Glover (18 March 1887 – 27 February 1941) was an Australian rules footballer who played for the Geelong Football Club in the Victorian Football League (VFL).
