= Herbert Wadsack =

Austrian librarian and writer

Herbert Wadsack (February 19, 1912, Knittelfeld – July 15, 2004, Vienna) was an Austrian librarian and writer.

He was at the Wehrmacht and was a prisoner of war.

He was a member of the Österreichischer Schriftstellerverband and of the PEN International.

== Works ==
- A-To-Nal, 1982
- Bescheidenes Massaker. Kurzprosa aus dreißig Jahren, 1995
- Das Gedichtwerk., 1995

=== Poetry books ===
- Die vor uns sterben, 1946
- Gewaltige Fuge des Lebens, 1966
