= Hubert (video game) =

- Developer: Brocap Studio
- Engine: Unreal Engine
- Platforms: Windows; PlayStation 5
- Release: Windows; 14 October 2026; PlayStation 5; TBA
- Genre: Action-adventure
- Mode: Single-player

Hubert is an adventure video game developed by Brocap Studio.

== Plot ==
The story focuses on a loyal German Shepherd named Hubert who belongs to a sharp-witted girl Lily. He shares a deep, protective bond with her. Hubert is tasked with herding and managing a chaotic flock of sheep under the supervision of a demanding farmer. The farm's fragile peace is threatened when a pack of wolves begins to attack from surrounding dark forests. As the predators draw closer, Hubert's primary duty shifts from routine herding to active defense of the flock and his human companions. The plot progresses to explore the tension between Hubert's loyalty to humans and his deep-seated, primal canine instincts, forcing him to navigate the boundary between the domestic and the wild to ensure the farm's survival.

== Gameplay ==
Player controls Hubert, a sheepdog who has to perform farm tasks and navigate through the surrounding wilderness. The game is played from a third-person perspective. The core gameplay loop focuses on canine instincts, herd management, and environmental interaction.

Player must gather, direct, and protect a flock of sheep across rugged terrain while meeting the demands of the farm owner. The flock is threatened by predatory wolves which forces player to utilize tactical positioning and defensive maneuvers to scare off or evade threats. The game uses a scent-tracking system and heightened animal instincts which helps player to discover hidden paths, locate lost livestock, and detect approaching threats. Player interacts with Lily, an AI-controlled child companion, executing cooperative tasks to solve environmental puzzles and secure the homestead.

== Development ==
Hubert is developed and published by Brocap Studio, an independent video game studio based in Brno. The game was announced in May 2025.

Version for Playstation 5 was announced on 10 August 2026. On 17 August 2026, Brocap Studio announced that Hubert will be released in October 2026 for PC and Playstation 5. On 31 August 2026, the release date of PC version was set for 12 October 2026. The PlayStation 5 version release date was scheduled to be announced in following weeks. On 12 October 2026 the game was delayed as the game build submitted by developer's was still waiting for review on Steam. The game was approved on 14 October 2026 and Brocap Studios subsequently announced that the game releases on the same day.

== Reception ==
Hubert has won the Best Game award at Game Access 2026.
