= Herbert Lincoln Spencer =

Herbert Lincoln Spencer (July 13, 1894 – January 29, 1960) was an American academic.

== Biography ==
Born on July 13, 1894, Spencer received his undergraduate degree from the Carnegie Institute of Technology (now Carnegie Mellon University) in Pittsburgh, Pennsylvania. Afterwards, he received a master's degree in 1929 and a doctorate in 1933 from the University of Pittsburgh, where he later served as Dean.

Spencer was president of the Pennsylvania College for Women (now Chatham University) from 1935 to 1945. After leaving PCW, he became the president of Bucknell University, serving in that capacity from 1945 to 1949.

Spencer was an archaeologist with a known interest in photography. He was also the first man to receive an honorary Doctor of Laws degree from PCW in 1946.
