= Herbert Crabtree =

English cricketer (1880–1951)

Herbert Crabtree (25 May 1880 – 2 March 1951) was an English cricketer active from 1902 to 1908 who played for Lancashire. He was born and died in Colne. He appeared in five first-class matches as a righthanded batsman, scoring 116 runs with a highest score of 49, and held one catch.
