= Herbert Huber =

Herbert Huber may refer to:

- Herbert Huber (botanist) (1931–2005), German botanist
- Herbert Huber (luger), Italian luger
- Herbert Huber (skier) (1944–1970), Austrian alpine skier
