= Herbert Rothwell =

English footballer

Herbert Rothwell (born 1880) was an English footballer. His regular position was at full back. He was born in Manchester. He played for Manchester United, Newton Heath Athletic, Glossop North End, and Manchester City.
