= Herbert Wassell Nadal =

Minstrel show performer

Herbert Wassell Nadal (November 29, 1873 - January 27, 1957) was a minstrel show performer on the vaudeville circuit.

== Biography ==
He was born on November 29, 1873, in Louisville, Kentucky, to Bernard William Nadal and Josephine Olmstead. He married Bessie K. Woodhead (1881–1932) around 1900 and they had as their child, Bernard W. Nadal (1902–1978).

He performed minstrel with Charley Willinghurst as the vaudeville team of Herbert & Willing on the B. F. Keith Circuit. The performed with Will Rogers, and Fanny Brice. Their routines included "My Darling Ducky-Wucky Honey Lamb" and "The Girl With the Ragtime Walk". He later owned theaters in Louisville.

He died in Louisville on January 27, 1957.
