= Herbert Clark =

Herbert Clark may refer to:

- Herbert E. Clark, Maine state legislator
- Herbert H. Clark, psycholinguist
- Herbert V. Clark, U.S. Army Air Corps/U.S. Air Force officer, member of the Tuskegee Airmen
- Herbert Clark (footballer), English footballer
- Herbert Clark (cricketer), see Walter Scott (American cricketer)
- Herb Clark Jr., winner of the 1992 Republican New Hampshire primary
- Herbert Clark (war correspondent), see New York Herald Tribune
- Herbert Clark, see Mount Marshall (New York)

== See also ==
- Bert Clark (disambiguation)
- Herbert Clarke (disambiguation)
