= Herbert Jackson =

Herbert Jackson may refer to:

- Sir Herbert Jackson (chemist) (1863–1936), British chemist
- Herbert Jackson (crammer) (1851-1921), tutor to students at the University of Oxford
- Herbert Jackson (architect) (1909–1989), British architect and town planner
- Les Jackson (cricketer) (Herbert Leslie Jackson, 1921–2008), English cricketer
- Rev Herbert Jackson, see Gahini
- Herb Jackson (born 1945), artist
- Herb Jackson (baseball) (1883–1922), pitcher in Major League Baseball
- Herbert William Jackson (1872–1940), officer of the British Indian Army
- Herbert L. Jackson (1908–1978), American politician

== See also ==
- Bert Jackson (disambiguation)
