= Herbert Lockyer =

Theological writer

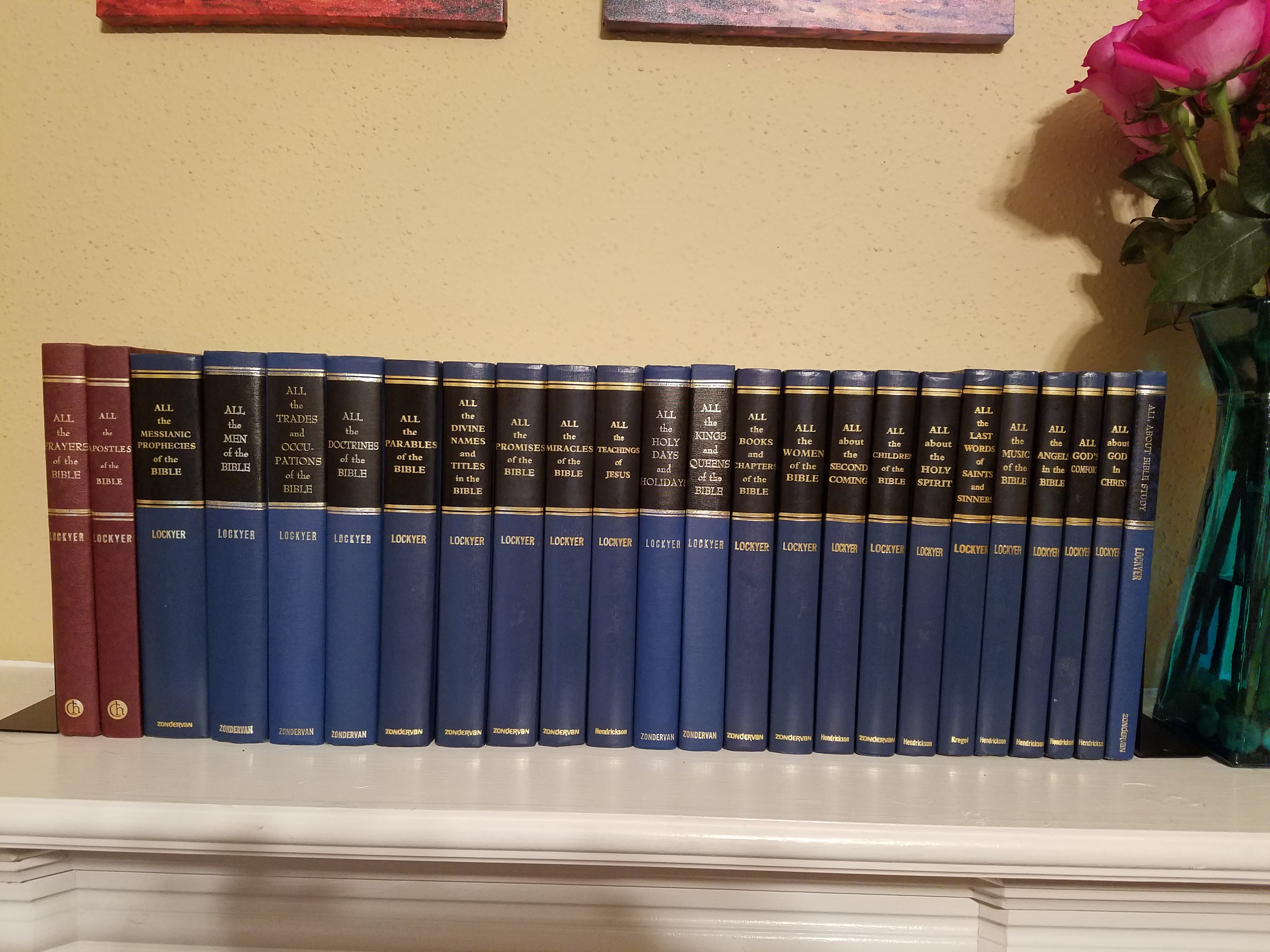
24 volumes of Lockyer's "All series"

Herbert Lockyer (1886–1984) was a minister and best-selling author of over 50 books, including the 21-volume "All" series. He was educated at Glasgow Bible Institute, afterwards receiving honorary degrees at Northwestern Evangelical Seminary, and the International Academy in London. He was most influential, however, after crossing the Atlantic to preach and write in the United States.

Dr. Lockyer was invited to preach at the 50th anniversary of the opening of the Moody Bible Institute, and this began his ministry in the United States. In the 1930s, the Institute published a number of his sermons, and Zondervan soon began to do the same. Dr. Lockyer also became influential in the Keswick Higher Life movement, ministering and publishing on both sides of the Atlantic. In his later life, his ministry was entirely focused on publishing, and his son, Herbert Lockyer, Jr., became his editor.

Billy Graham wrote, "Dr. Lockyer was unquestionably one of the spiritual giants of our century, and his prolific writings will continue to make an impact on countless Christians for generations to come if our Lord tarries."

Lockyer wrote the introduction to the Zondervan reprint edition of Ellicott's Commentary on the Whole Bible, (1959 and 1981) which he begins by saying, "As I journey back through almost half a century of Christian witness, of the many books that helped to shape my ministry, none has been so eagerly consulted as the volumes comprising Ellicott's Bible Commentary for English Readers, now known as 'Ellicott's Commentary on the Whole Bible.' This valuable eight-volume set is conspicuous among Commentaries for its adherence to the divine inspiration of Holy Scripture; its conservative approach to foundational truths; its comprehensive treatment of books, chapters and verses."

== Bibliography ==
The following is an incomplete list of Herbert Lockyer's published books. Many of his sermons were also published in pamphlet form, most of which are now out of print.

- 41 Major Bible Themes Simply Explained
- All About Bible Study
- All About God in Christ
- All About the Holy Spirit
- All about the Second Coming
- All God's Comfort
- All the 2's of the Bible
- All the 3s of the Bible
- All the Angels in the Bible
- All the Apostles of the Bible
- All the Books and Chapters of the Bible (1966)
- All the Children of the Bible (1970)
- All the Divine Names and Titles in the Bible (1975)
- All the Doctrines of the Bible (1964)
- All the Holy Days and Holidays: Or, Sermons on All National and Religious Memorial Days
- All the Kings and Queens of the Bible (USA, 1961)
- All the Last Words of Saints and Sinners (1969)
- All the Men of the Bible (USA, 1958)
- All the Messianic Prophecies of the Bible (1973)
- All the Miracles of the Bible (1961)
- All the Music of the Bible (1968)
- All the Parables of the Bible (1963)
- All the Prayers of the Bible (1959)
- All the Promises of the Bible (1962)
- All the Teachings of Jesus
- All the Trades and Occupations of the Bible (1969)
- All the Women of the Bible (1983)
- Ancient Portraits in Modern Frames, Bible Biographies (Volume One)
- The Art of Winning Souls (USA, 1954)
- Bible-centered devotions on purity and hope (Seasons of the Lord; v. 1) (Harper & Row, all vols. 1977)
- Bible-centered devotions on resurrection and glory (Seasons of the Lord; v. 2)
- Bible-centered devotions on fulfillment and splendor (Seasons of the Lord; v. 3)
- Bible-centered devotions on silence and remembrance (Seasons of the Lord; v. 4)
- Blessed Assurance (Zondervan, 1955)
- The Breath of God (Cleveland, 1949)
- Cameos of Prophecy: Are These the Last Days? (Zondervan, 1942)
- Christ in the Scriptures (Zondervan, 1936)
- The Christ of Christmas
- The Comfort of God: Meditations on the Goodness of God (Victory Press, 1956)
- Cure For Troubled Hearts
- Daily Promises
- Dark Threads the Weaver Needs (1979)
- Death and the Life Hereafter
- Dying, Death, and Destiny (1980)
- Evangelize or Fossilize! (Chicago, 1938)
- Everything Jesus Taught (1984)
- The Fairest of All and Other Sermons
- The Fascinating Study of Prophecy (Zondervan, 1957)
- The Four Horsemen of the Apocalypse
- The Four Women of the Apocalypse
- From a Bishop's Basket: Twelve Sermons (Pickering & Inglis, London)
- The Funeral Service Book (USA, 1967) [also The Funeral Sourcebook, 2013]
- Give Us This Day: Daily Portions for Pilgrims (1942)
- God's Book of Faith: Meditations from Job
- God's Book of Poetry: Meditations from the Psalms (1983)
- God's Promise Box (Lockley Press, 1945)
- God's Witnesses: Stories of Real Faith (1997)
- The Gospel of the Life Beyond (1967)
- The Gospel in the Pentateuch (1939)
- Heaven (USA, 1954)
- The Heritage of Saints: Studies in the Holy Spirit (1950)
- The Holy Spirit of God (1981)
- How to Find Comfort in the Bible
- How To Make Prayer More Effective (Zondervan, 1954)
- Illustrated Dictionary Of The Bible [New]
- The Keeping Power of God (1981)
- Last Words of Saints and Sinners (1969)
- The Lenten Sourcebook: Including Thoughts and Messages for Easter Day (1968)
- The Life Beyond (1995)
- Light to Live By (1979)
- Love Is Better Than Wine (New Leaf Press, 1981)
- Major Themes of the New Testament
- The Man Who Changed the World: Conquests of Christ Through the Centuries (2 vol.) (1966)
- The Man Who Died for Me: Meditations on the Death and Resurrection of Our Lord (Word Books, 1979)
- The Mulberry Trees or When Revival Comes (Eerdmans, 1936)
- One Sin God Hates (USA, 1955)
- Portraits of the Savior (1983)
- Power of Prayer
- Psalms: A Devotional Commentary (1993)
- The Rapture of the Saints
- Revelation: Drama of the Ages
- Roses in December and Other Sermons (Eerdmans, 1936)
- Satan and the Spider (1945)
- Satan: His Person and Power (Word, 1980)
- Satanic Conflict of the Ages: The Romantic Story of the Seed Royal (Victory Press, 1955)
- Seasons of the Lord: Bible-Centered Devotions for the Entire Year (1990)
- Selected Scripture Summaries from the New Testament
- Seven Words of Love (1969)
- The Seven Pillars of God's Wisdom
- The Sins of Saints: Scriptural Unfolding of Victorious Living (Loizeaux, USA, 1970)
- Sorrows and Stars (Eerdmans, 1938)
- The Swan Song of Paul, Or, Fascinating Studies in Second Timothy (USA, 1936)
- Their Finest Hour: Thrilling Moments in Ancient History (1979)
- Twin Truths of Scripture (The Lockyer Bible Preacher's Library, Volume 1) (1973)
- V for Victory: Sermons on the Christian's Victories (1941)
- The Week That Changed the World (1968)
- What Jesus Taught (Kingsway, also Victory Books, 1977)
- When God Died (1936)
- World Changers: Fascinating Figures from Church History
