= Bert Laeyendecker =

Dutch sociologist (1930–2020)

Leonardus "Bert" Laeyendecker (18 June 1930 – 8 August 2020) was a Dutch sociologist. He was professor of sociology at Leiden University from 1973 to 1989. He specialized in sociology of religion.

== Life ==
Laeyendecker was born on 18 June 1930 in Utrecht. He obtained his doctorate in social geography at the University of Amsterdam in 1967 under professor S. Hofstra with a thesis titled: "Religion and conflict: the so-called sects in sociological perspective". From August 1967 to October 1973 he was lector of sociology at the University of Amsterdam. In October 1973 he became professor of sociology at Leiden University. His appointment ended in February 1989 due to a reorganization. From 1989 to 1992 he served as director of the Multidisciplinary Center for Church and Society (Dutch: Multidisciplinair Centrum voor Kerk en Samenleving).

During the 1960s Laeyendecker started research on sociology of religion, especially that of the Catholic Church in the Netherlands, and continued to do so throughout his career. Kees de Groot and Erik Sengers stated that Laeyendecker was one of the greatest sociologists in the Netherlands between the 1970s and 1980s.

In early 1970, Laeyendecker resigned as Father Augustinian because of Clerical celibacy in the Catholic Church which was also propagated by Dutch Cardinal Bernardus Johannes Alfrink. In 1993 Laeyendecker concluded that the Second Vatican Council had inspired a counter-reaction and that official authority of the Catholic Church over believers had greatly diminished in the second half of the 20th century.

Laeyendecker was elected a member of the Royal Netherlands Academy of Arts and Sciences in 1989.

He died on 8 August 2020 at the age of 90.
