= Herbert Mohr =

German politician (born 1988)

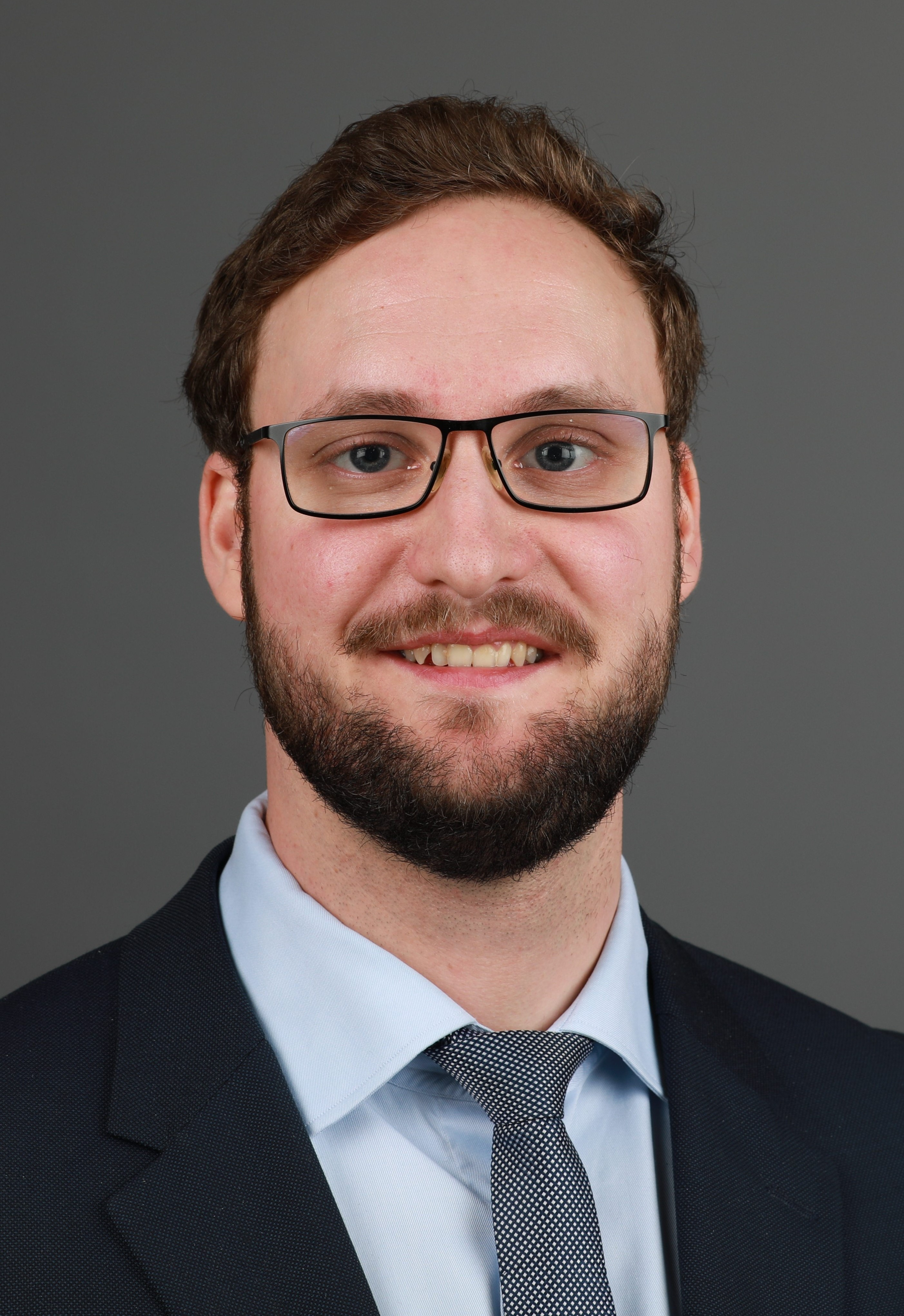
- Mohr in 2017

Member of the Berlin House of Representatives
- In office 27 October 2016 – 4 November 2021

Personal details
- Born: 8 August 1988 (age 38) Berlin
- Party: Alternative for Germany (since 2013)

Herbert Mohr (born 8 August 1988 in Berlin) is a German politician serving as a borough councillor of Pankow since 2021. From 2016 to 2021, he was a member of the Berlin House of Representatives.
