= Herbert Webb =

English cricketer

Personal information
- Full name: Herbert George Webb
- Born: 1 July 1913; Headington, Oxfordshire, England
- Died: 7 August 1947 (aged 34); St Albans, Hertfordshire, England
- Batting: Right-handed
- Role: Wicket-keeper

Domestic team information
- Years: Team
- 1936: Minor Counties
- 1935: Oxford University
- 1935–1937: Oxfordshire

Career statistics
Competition	First-class
Matches	3
Runs scored	88
Batting average	17.60
100s/50s	–/–
Top score	38
Balls bowled	–
Wickets	–
Bowling average	–
5 wickets in innings	–
10 wickets in match	–
Best bowling	–
Catches/stumpings	1/–
- Source: Cricinfo, 28 July 2013

Herbert George Webb (1 July 1913 – 7 August 1947) was an English cricketer active in the mid-1930s. Born at Headington, Oxfordshire, Webb was a right-handed batsman who played as a wicket-keeper, playing the majority of his cricket in minor counties cricket, though he did make three appearances in first-class cricket.

== Career ==
While studying at the University of Oxford, Webb made two first-class appearances for the university cricket club against HDG Leveson Gower's XI and Sussex in 1935, scoring a total of 72 runs in these matches, with a high score of 38. In that same season he also made his debut in minor counties cricket for Oxfordshire, with his debut coming against Bedfordshire in the Minor Counties Championship. He played minor counties cricket for Oxfordshire until 1937, making a total of 22 appearances. He made a third first-class appearance in 1936 when he was selected to play for a combined Minor Counties cricket team against Oxford University.

He died at St Albans, Hertfordshire on 7 August 1947.
