= Herbert Hill (footballer) =

Australian rules footballer

Personal information
- Full name: Herbert Alfred Hill
- Born: 28 November 1887; Richmond, Victoria
- Died: 24 August 1955 (aged 67); Richmond, Victoria
- Height: 178 cm (5 ft 10 in)
- Weight: 71 kg (157 lb)

Playing career^{1}
Years	Club	Games (Goals)
1907	Melbourne	8 (0)
1908–09	Richmond	24 (4)
Total		32 (4)
- ^{1} Playing statistics correct to the end of 1909.

Herbert Alfred Hill (28 November 1887 – 24 August 1955) was an Australian rules footballer who played with Melbourne and Richmond in the Victorian Football League (VFL).
