= Herbert Clarke =

Herbert Clarke may refer to:

- Herbert Clarke (skater) (1879–1956), British figure skater
- Herbert L. Clarke (1867–1945), American cornet player
- Herbert Clarke, railway guard in 1944 Soham rail disaster in England
- Herb Clarke (ice hockey) (1887–1938), Canadian ice hockey player
- Herb Clarke (weatherman) (1927–2012), American TV-journalist

== See also ==
- Herbert Clark (disambiguation)
