= William Law (cricketer) =

English cricketer (1851–1892)

William Law (9 April 1851 – 20 December 1892) was an English amateur first-class cricketer, who played four matches for Yorkshire County Cricket Club between 1871 and 1873. He also played first-class cricket for Oxford University (1871–1874), Marylebone Cricket Club (MCC) (1873–1882), Gentlemen of England (1871–1883), The Gentlemen (1873) and I Zingari (1881–1882). He played non first-class games for I Zingari (1872–1875), MCC (1874) and Harrow Wanderers (1887).

Born in Rochdale, Lancashire, England, Law was educated at Harrow School, where he played for the cricket eleven from 1868 to 1870. He went up to Brasenose College, Oxford, and won his cricket blue in the four years from 1871 to 1874, captaining the team in 1874.

A right-handed batsman, he scored 501 runs in all first-class cricket at 10.65, with a top score of 39 against Cambridge University, and took 14 wickets, bowling right arm pace, at 25.21 with a best of 4 for 83 against Middlesex. He took seventeen catches in the field. His brother, George Law, played eleven games for MCC and Middlesex, while his brother in law, Herbert Hill, also played two matches for the MCC.

He entered the church and served in several Yorkshire and London parishes. He died in December 1892 in Rotherham, Yorkshire from pleurisy, aged 41. A new cricket pavilion was erected to his memory at Harrow cricket field in 1893.
