= Herbert Barker =

Herbert Barker may refer to:

- Herbert Atkinson Barker (1869–1950), English manipulative surgeon
- Herbert Barker (golfer) (1883–1924), English golfer and golf course architect
- Herb Barker (1929–2006), Australian athlete
