= Herbert R. Hunt =

American architect

- Born: 1885; Lowell, Massachusetts
- Died: 1961 (aged 75–76); Providence, Rhode Island
- Occupation: Architect
- Buildings: Rosedale Apartments

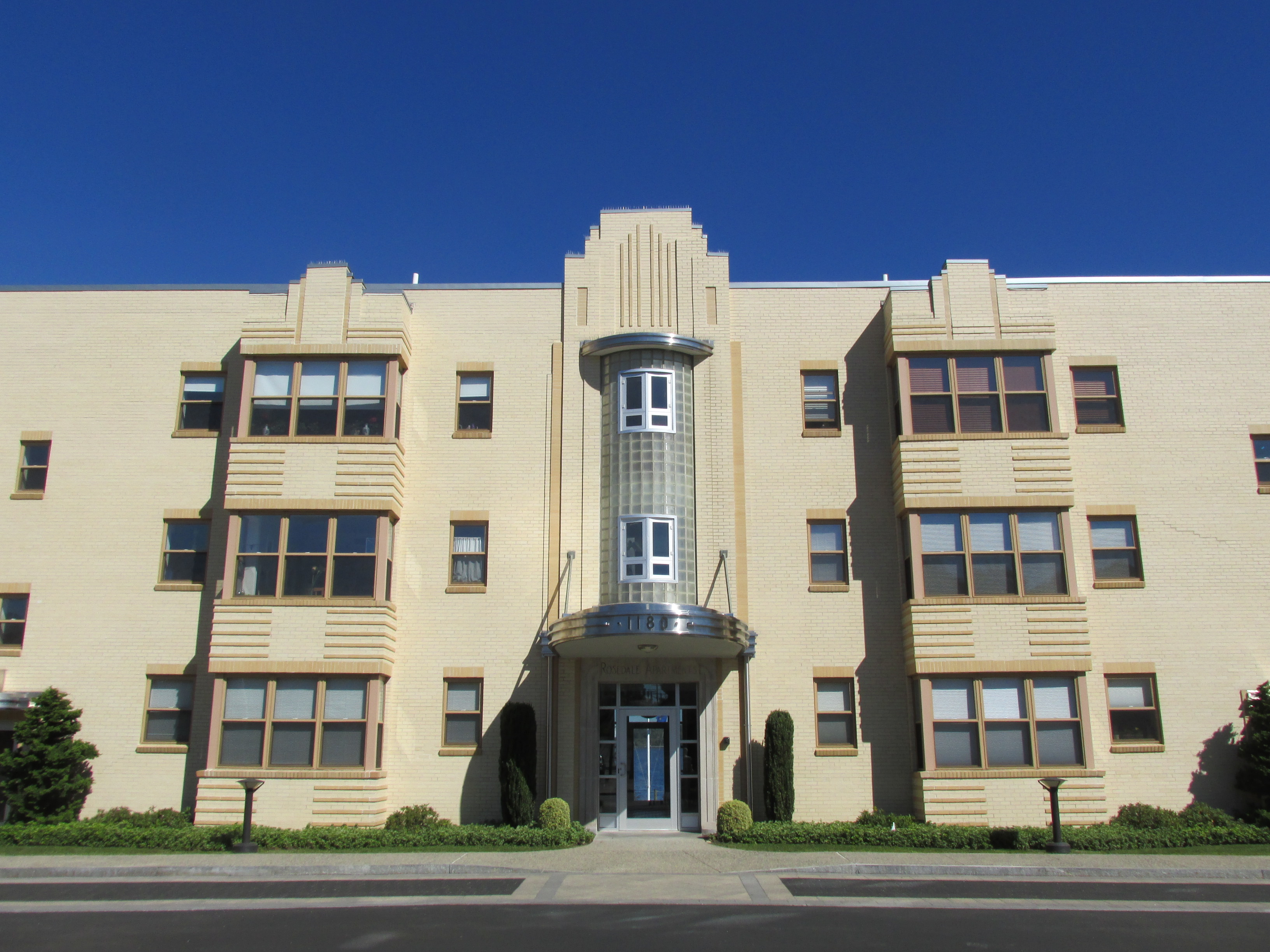
Rosedale Apartments, Cranston, 1939.

Herbert R. Hunt (1885–1961) was an American architect from Providence, Rhode Island.

He was born in Lowell, Massachusetts, and was working as a draftsman by age 15. By 1915, he was working as an architect in Providence. Around 1917 he left the city, returning in 1922. His most prominent surviving building is the Rosedale Apartments in Cranston, built in 1939. Hunt retired in 1954 and died in 1961 at the age of 74.

A great deal of Hunt's work was for the Cherry & Webb Company and associated businesses.

== Works ==
- 1917 - Cherry & Webb Building, 139 S Main St, Fall River, Massachusetts
- 1925 - Herbert R. Hunt House, 1080 Narragansett Blvd, Cranston, Rhode Island
- 1925 - O'Gorman Building, 93 Eddy St, Providence, Rhode Island
- 1934 - Cherry & Webb Warehouse, 117 Merrimack St, Lowell, Massachusetts
- 1939 - Rosedale Apartments, 1180 Narragansett Blvd, Cranston, Rhode Island
- 1939 - WPRO Radio Station, 1502 Wampanoag Tr, East Providence, Rhode Island
  - Demolished
