= Herbert Wade =

Herbert Wade may refer to:

- Herbert Wade (medical doctor) (1886–1968), American medical doctor
- Herby Wade (1905–1980), South African cricketer
