= Herbert Inch =

American composer

Herbert Reynolds Inch (November 25, 1904 - April 14, 1988) was an American composer. A native of Missoula, Montana, he studied music first at the University of Montana and later at the Eastman School of Music, where his teachers included Edward Royce and Howard Hanson. He taught theory at the school for a year before accepting a fellowship with the American Academy in Rome. He worked for a time in the music division of the New York Public Library; from 1937 until retiring in 1965 he taught at Hunter College. He was a visiting professor at the University of Michigan in 1949. He died in La Jolla, San Diego, California.
