= Herbert Ward =

Bert or Herbert Ward may refer to:

- Herbert Ward (footballer) (1873–1897), English footballer who played for Southampton and Hampshire cricketer
- Herbert Ward (rugby) (1873–1955), rugby union footballer who played for England and Bradford F.C.
- Herbert Ward (sculptor) (1863–1919), British sculptor, explorer, writer and friend of Roger Casement
- G. H. B. Ward (also known as Bert Ward, 1876–1957), activist for walkers' rights and a Labour Party politician
- Herbert Dickinson Ward (1861–1932), American author
- Burt Ward (born 1945), American television actor and activist
- Herbert Ward (priest), father of John Sebastian Marlowe Ward
