= Herbert Stachowiak =

German philosopher

Herbert Stachowiak (* 28 May 1921 in Berlin; † 9 June 2004 in Berlin) was a German philosopher. From 1973 to 1986 he taught as a full professor at the University of Paderborn.

== Life ==
After a commercial apprenticeship in the aircraft industry, Stachowiak obtained his Abitur in 1941 through the second educational path. He continued to work in industry and as a teacher at a night school before he was drafted for military service in 1944. From 1946, he studied mathematics, physics and philosophy in Berlin, first at what is now Humboldt University and later at the Free University, which had been newly founded in 1948 because of the political conditions in the west of the city. In 1956 he received his doctorate with a dissertation on the foundations of mathematics. From 1949 to 1973, he was the owner and director of a private evening school in Berlin. In 1949 he was one of the founders of the Rundfunk im amerikanischen Sektor Radio University and regularly lectured on scientific, philosophical and cultural-political topics.

After teaching assignments and a substitute professorship, he was appointed associate professor at the Free University of Berlin in 1971. In 1973, he was appointed to Paderborn to teach the theory of science and planning. From 1973 to 1977 he was on leave there and at the same time director of the North Rhine-Westphalian Research and Development Centre for Objectified Teaching and Learning (FEoLL), where he worked with Helmar Frank and Miloš Lánský, among others. Since 1973 he was married to Brigitte Stachowiak-Prästel, who also assisted in his scientific work.

Herbert Stachowiak died in 2004 in Berlin at the age of 83 years. His grave is located in the Waldfriedhof Zehlendorf.

== Work ==
At the age of 26, stud. math. nat. Herbert Stachowiak gave a speech on "The Scientific Ideal of Academic Youth" at the 1st Dies Academicus of the Student Council of the University of Berlin in 1947. With this speech he predetermined basic features of his scientific life. Science had to face up to the tension between the purposeless search for truth and the ethical commitment to humane living conditions. Science must also consider the problems of value, and it must not allow itself to be taken into service by flat utilitarian interests and inhuman claims to power. Science strives for truth, but it must consider in critical reflection "that there is always truth only from a model perspective".

Since the 1950s, the model perspective received a strong boost from the new cognitive programme of cybernetics (Norbert Wiener) and systems theory (Ludwig von Bertalanffy), which can almost be characterised as a model-scientific approach. Consequently, Stachowiak's first monograph is called "Thinking and Knowing in the Cybernetic Model" (1965). He generalised and systematised the model concept in the standard work "Allgemeine Modelltheorie" (General Model Theory, 1973), which has never been translated into English. According to this, all cognition is cognition in models. Models are representations of "reality", which, however, necessarily shorten what is represented. The respective shaping of the models depends on the model constructor, his historical and social situation as well as his cognitive or creative interests. Thus, in addition to the depictive and foreshortening features, it is especially the pragmatic feature that determines how models are dealt with. That is why Stachowiak undertakes a broad critical survey of pragmatic philosophy and conceives a "systematic neopragmatism". This is reflected in the impressive anthology "Pragmatics" (5 volumes, 1986–1995), which, annotated by the editor in each case and placed in the overall concept, includes around one hundred renowned authors (including. Paul Feyerabend, Jürgen Habermas, Peter Janich, Hans Lenk, Jürgen Mittelstrass, Anatol Rapoport).

Herbert Stachowiak has been an independent thinker and does not have an academic "picture book career" to show for it. Committed to a rational and critical philosophy at the core, he did not form a "school" himself and was not included by any of the authoritative "schools". In his undogmatic basic attitude, he sought to integrate parts of these school opinions into his thought, but this did not always meet with the approval of his colleagues. Thus, despite its impressive breadth, conclusiveness and modernity, his philosophy has so far been received only very inadequately.

== Publications ==
In addition to more than 200 articles in journals and anthologies, Stachowiak has published the following books, among others:

- Denken und Erkennen im kybernetischen Modell, Wien/New York: Springer 1965
- Rationalismus im Ursprung, Wien/New York: Springer 1971
- Allgemeine Modelltheorie, Wien/New York: Springer 1973
- Bedürfnisse, Werte und Normen im Wandel (ed. together with Th. Ellwein, Th. Herrmann u. K. Stapf), 2 Bände, München: Fink 1982 u. Paderborn: Schöningh 1982
- Problemlösungsoperator Sozialwissenschaft, anwendungsorientierte Modelle der Sozial- und Planungswissenschaften in ihrer Wirksamkeitsproblematik (ed. together with Norbert Müller), 2 Bände, Stuttgart: Enke 1987
- Pragmatik: Handbuch pragmatischen Denkens (ed.), 5 Bände, Hamburg: Meiner 1986–1995; Lizenzausgabe Darmstadt: Wissenschaftliche Buchgesellschaft 1997

Since 2010, Herbert Stachowiak's scholarly estate belongs to the rare book collection (Handschriften- und Nachlassabteilung) of the Staatsbibliothek zu Berlin.

== Literature ==
- Siegfried Piotrowski (2010). "Stachowiak, Herbert". Neue Deutsche Biographie (in German). Vol. 24. Berlin: Duncker & Humblot. pp. 778–779. (full text online).
- Kurt Wuchterl: Pragmatismus als Modelltheorie. Zur Aktualität der neopragmatischen Erkenntnistheorie von Herbert Stachowiak, in: Philosophisches Jahrbuch 86 (1979) 409–425.
