= Herbert Fox =

English cricketer

Personal information
- Full name: Herbert Francis Fox
- Born: 1 August 1858; Brislington, Somerset, England
- Died: 20 January 1926 (aged 67); Denmark Hill, London, England
- Batting: Right-handed
- Bowling: Left-arm (unknown style)

Domestic team information
- Years: Team
- 1882–1891: Somerset
- First-class debut: 8 June 1882 Somerset v Lancashire
- Last First-class: 20 July 1891 Somerset v Gloucestershire

Career statistics
Competition	First-class
Matches	10
Runs scored	133
Batting average	7.82
100s/50s	0/0
Top score	31
Catches/stumpings	5/–
- Source: CricketArchive, 5 March 2011

Herbert Francis Fox (1 August 1858 – 20 January 1926) was an English cricketer who made 10 first-class appearances for Somerset County Cricket Club between 1882 and 1891. He later played for Oxfordshire and Suffolk in the Minor Counties Championship.

== Life and career ==
Herbert Francis was the fourth son of Francis Ker and Mary Fox. He attended Clifton College, who he represented in a number of cricket matches in 1876 and 1877. He continued his education at University College, Oxford. He married Rachel Mary Garrett on 27 August 1892 in Bathwick, Taunton, Somerset. He tutored at Brasenose College, and later edited a piece in the Westminster Gazette entitled 'Renderings into Greek and Latin verse', in which readers submitted Latin and Greek verse.

== Cricket career ==
Having played for Clifton College, Fox made his first appearance for Somerset County Cricket Club in August 1877, playing for the "Gentlemen of Somerset" against a similarly named Devon side. Batting at number nine, Fox scored a duck in his only innings. He continued to play for Somerset in the following years, during which time they played second-class cricket. His batting was inconsistent during these years; he failed to score as many as 20 runs in a single innings at all for Somerset during 1877 and 1878, but in 1879 he scored three half-centuries. His highest score for Somerset came in a second-class match during 1881, when he scored 89 runs against Gloucestershire.

He made his first-class debut in 1882, playing in Somerset's first-ever match at this level. He never scored 50 runs or more in a single innings in first-class cricket, his highest score being the 31 he reached against Hampshire in his second first-class match. He played irregularly for Somerset, making four appearances in 1882, three the following season and two in 1884. He continued to play for the county after they lost their first-class status, between 1886 and 1890, but only played once more after they had regained it, appearing in his final first-class match, against Gloucestershire in 1891. He continued to play cricket after this, appearing for Incogniti, Lansdown and the Marylebone Cricket Club. In the early twentieth century, he made a small number of appearances in the Minor Counties Championship, playing three times for Oxfordshire in 1902, for whom he scored a century and a 99, and twice for Suffolk in 1908.
