= Herbert Marshall (disambiguation) =

Herbert Marshall (1890–1966) was an English actor.

Herbert Marshall may also refer to:

- Herbert Menzies Marshall (1841–1913), English watercolour painter and illustrator
- Sir Joseph Herbert Marshall (1851–1918), British concert impresario and Lord Mayor of Leicester
- Herbert Marshall (statistician) (1888–1977), Canadian academic and statistician
- Herbert Marshall (writer) (1906–1991), British writer, filmmaker, scenic designer, and scholar of Russian literature
