= Herbert Burton =

New Zealand cricketer

Personal information
- Born: 19 March 1888; Greenwich, London, England
- Died: 24 March 1961 (aged 73); Auckland, New Zealand
- Source: ESPNcricinfo, 4 June 2016

Herbert Burton (19 March 1888 – 24 March 1961) was a New Zealand cricketer. He played first-class cricket for Auckland and Wellington between 1909 and 1924.

== See also ==
- List of Auckland representative cricketers
