= Barnet =

Barnet may refer to:

== People ==
- Barnet (surname)
- Barnet (given name)

== Places ==
=== United Kingdom ===
- Chipping Barnet or High Barnet, commonly known as Barnet, one of three focal towns of the borough below.
- East Barnet, an area in the borough below; ancient parish.
- New Barnet, an area in the borough below.
- Friern Barnet, an area in the borough below.

Administrative units

- London Borough of Barnet, in Greater London, England
- Chipping Barnet (UK Parliament constituency) (since 1974)

Historic units

- Barnet Urban District (1863–1965) in Hertfordshire
- East Barnet Urban District (1874-1965), neighbour of the above
- Friern Barnet Urban District (1883-1965) in Middlesex
- Barnet Rural District, former name (1894–1941) of Elstree Rural District
- Barnet (UK Parliament constituency) (1945–1974)
- Barnet (electoral division), Greater London Council

=== United States ===
- Barnet, Vermont, United States, a New England town
  - Barnet (CDP), Vermont, village in the town
- Barnet Run, a stream in West Virginia, United States

=== Canada ===
- Barnet, British Columbia, Canada, a settlement now part of the city of Burnaby

== Other uses ==
- Battle of Barnet, in the Wars of the Roses in 15th century England
- Barnet F.C., a football club in London
- Barnet, Danish title of the 1940 Danish film The Child
- "Barnet", rhyming slang for "hair" (from "Barnet Fair")

== See also ==
- Barnett (disambiguation)
  - Barnett, a given name and surname
