= Barnett (disambiguation) =

Barnett is both a surname and a masculine given name.

Barnett may also refer to:

- Barnett class lifeboat, operated by the RNLI between 1923 and 1989
- Barnett effect, magnetisation of spinning objects
- Barnett formula, in UK public expenditure
- Barnett, Georgia, a community in the United States
- Barnett Township (disambiguation), various townships in the United States

== See also ==
- Barnet (disambiguation)
- Burnett (surname)
- Francis-Barnett, a motorcycle manufacturer
