= Barnett =

Barnett is both a surname and a masculine given name.

== Surname ==
Barnett is an Anglo-Saxon and Old French surname that came after the Norman Invasion. The original Anglo-Saxon spelling is baernet which means "the clearing of woodland by burning". The Norman version of the surname likely meant 'the son of Bernard', but it could have also been derived from any of the similar sounding Gaulish names.

- A. Mary Tropper (née Barnett, 1917–2009), British mathematician
- Alonza Barnett (born 2003), American football player
- Annie Wall Barnett (1859–1942), American writer, litterateur, poet
- Blake Barnett (born 1995), American football player
- Brett Barnett, director and co-writer of webseries Shadazzle
- Caden Barnett (born 2003), American football player
- Charlene Barnett (1928–1979), All-American Girls Professional Baseball League player
- Charlie Barnett (disambiguation), several people
- Colin Barnett (born 1950), former Premier of Western Australia
- Correlli Barnett (1927–2022), English military historian
- Courtney Barnett (born 1987), Australian singer, songwriter, and musician
- Carol Jenkins Barnett (1956–2021), American businesswoman and philanthropist
- Sir Denis Barnett (1906–1992), British air chief marshal
- Derek Barnett (born 1996), American football player
- Dick Barnett (1936–2025), American basketball player
- Donald Lee Barnett (1930–2017), American pastor
- Doris Barnett (born 1953), German politician (SPD)
- Errol Barnett (born 1983), American news anchor and correspondent
- Euphemia Cowan Barnett (1890–1970), Scottish botanist
- Frank Barnett (1933–2016), 49th Governor of American Samoa
- Fred Barnett (born 1960), American football player
- Gary Barnett (born 1946), American football coach
- George Barnett (1859–1930), 12th Commandant of the United States Marine Corps
- George Ezra Barnett (born 1993), British singer and songwriter
- Griff Barnett (1884–1958), American actor
- Guy Barnett (Australian politician) (born 1962)
- Guy Barnett (British politician) (1928–1986)
- Harvey Barnett (1925–1995), Australian intelligence officer
- Henrietta Barnett (WRAF officer) (1905–1985), senior officer of the Women's Royal Air Force
- Isobel Barnett (1918–1980), Scottish radio and TV personality
- James Barnett (disambiguation), multiple people
- Janet Barnett, American mathematician
- Jay Barnett (born 2001), Australian association football player
- Jerry Barnett (born 1951), American racing driver
- Joan Barnett (1945–2020), American casting director and television executive producer
- Joel Barnett (1923–2014), British politician
- John Barnett (disambiguation), multiple people
- Jordan Barnett (disambiguation), multiple people
- Josh Barnett (born 1977), American heavyweight mixed martial arts fighter
- Leon Barnett (born 1985), English football player
- Lincoln Barnett (1909–1979), American editor and writer
- Louis Barnett (1865–1946), New Zealand professor of surgery
- Louis Barnett (chocolatier) (born 1991), British chocolatier
- Lucy Barnett (born 2006), Isle of Man cricketer
- Mac Barnett (born 1982), American children's book writer
- Mason Barnett (born 2000), American baseball player
- Mike Barnett (baseball) (born 1959), American baseball coach and replay coordinator
- Morris S. Barnett (1808–1902), American politician
- Nick Barnett (born 1981), American football player
- Oliver Barnett (born 1966), American football player
- Phillip Barnett (born 1990), American football player
- Randy Barnett (born 1952), American libertarian legal theorist
- Rex Barnett (born 1938), American politician, and former officer of the Missouri State Highway Patrol
- Richard Barnett (disambiguation), several people
- Robin Barnett (born 1958), British diplomat
- Ross Barnett (1898–1987), 56th Governor of Mississippi
- Samuel Augustus Barnett (1844–1913), English clergyman and reformer
- Samuel Jackson Barnett (1873–1956), American physicist, discoverer of the Barnett effect
- Samuel Barnett (actor) (born 1980), English actor
- Shannie Barnett (1919–1991), American basketball player
- Stacy Barnett, victim in the murders of John Goosey and Stacy Barnett
- Stephen D. Barnett (born c. 1969), United States Navy admiral
- Steven Barnett (born 1943), American water polo player
- Steven Barnett (born 1979), Australian diver
- Tahliah Barnett (born 1988), English pop artist known professionally as FKA Twigs
- Thomas Barnett (disambiguation), several people
- Troy Barnett (born 1971), American football player
- Vince Barnett (1902–1977), American film actor
- William P. Barnett (born 1958), American organizational theorist
- Zoe Barnett (1883–1969), American actress

== Given name ==
- Barnett Berry, American research professor
- Barney Danson (1921–2011), Canadian politician and cabinet minister
- Barney Frank (1940–2026), American politician, considered the most prominent gay politician in the United States
- Barnette Miller (1875–1956), American college professor
- Barnett Newman (1905–1970), American artist
- Barnett Slepian (1946–1998), American physician and murder victim
- Barnett Rosenberg (1926–2009), American chemist, discoverer of the anti-tumour effects of cisplatin
- Barney Rosset (1922–2012), owner of the publishing house Grove Press, publisher and Editor-in-Chief of the magazine Evergreen Review
