= Barnet (surname) =

Barnet is a surname. Notable people with the surname include:

- Barry Barnet (born 1961), Canadian politician
- Boris Barnet (1902–1965), Soviet film director
- Charlie Barnet (1913–1991), American jazz saxophonist
- Herbert L. Barnet (1909–1970), American business executive
- Horace Barnet (1856–1941), English footballer
- James Barnet (1827–1904), British colonial architect
- John Barnet (14th century), English bishop
- Jonathan Barnet (18th century), English privateer
- José Agripino Barnet (1864–1945), Cuban politician
- Melvin L. Barnet (1914–1998), American newspaper editor
- Miguel Barnet (born 1940), Cuban novelist
- Nahum Barnet (1855–1931), Australian architect
- Olga Barnet (1951–2021), Russian actress
- Richard Barnet (1929–2004), American activist
- Vern Barnet (born 1942), American Unitarian Universalist pastor
- Will Barnet (1911–2012), American artist

== See also ==
- Barnett
- Burnett (surname)
