= Quercus mespilifolia =

Conservation status
- Data Deficient (IUCN 3.1)

Scientific classification
- Kingdom: Plantae
- Clade: Embryophytes
- Clade: Tracheophytes
- Clade: Angiosperms
- Clade: Eudicots
- Clade: Rosids
- Order: Fagales
- Family: Fagaceae
- Genus: Quercus
- Subgenus: Quercus subg. Cerris
- Section: Quercus sect. Cyclobalanopsis
- Species: Q. mespilifolia

Binomial name
- Quercus mespilifolia Wall. ex A.DC.

Synonyms
- Cyclobalanopsis mespilifolia (Wall. ex A.DC.) Oerst.; Quercus kerrii var. pubescens Barnett; Quercus mespilifolia var. pubescens Barnett ex Smitinand & Phengklai; Quercus mespilifolioides A.Camus

Species of oak tree

Quercus mespilifolia is a tree species in the family Fagaceae. There are no known subspecies. It is placed in subgenus Cerris, section Cyclobalanopsis.

The known distribution of Q. mespilifolia is northeastern India, Bangladesh, Myanmar, Thailand, Laos and Vietnam. In Vietnam it can be found in the Sơn La and Lang Bian areas and may be called sồi lá nhôt.
