= Barnet (given name) =

Barnet is a masculine given name which may refer to:

- Barnet Burns (1805–1860), English sailor, trader and showman
- Barnet Isaacs (1851–1897), birth name of Barney Barnato, British mining entrepreneur in South Africa
- Barnet Kellman (born 1947), American television and film director, television producer and film actor
- Barnet Kenyon (1850–1930), British colliery worker, trade union official and politician
- Barnet M. Levy (1917–2014), American oral pathologist and professor

== See also ==
- Barnett, a given name and surname
