= Philip Jessup =

American lawyer, diplomat, judge (1897–1986)

Judge of the International Court of Justice
- In office 1960–1969
- Preceded by: Green Hackworth
- Succeeded by: Hardy Dillard

U.S. Ambassador at Large
- In office March 2, 1949 – January 19, 1953
- Appointed by: Harry Truman

Personal details
- Born: Philip Caryl Jessup; February 5, 1897 New York City, New York, U.S.
- Died: January 31, 1986 (aged 88) Newtown, Pennsylvania, U.S.
- Spouse: Lois Walcott Kellogg (m. 1921)
- Education: Hamilton College (BA); Yale University (LLB); Columbia University (PhD)

Philip Caryl Jessup (February 5, 1897 – January 31, 1986) was an American diplomat, scholar, and jurist notable for his accomplishments in the field of international law.

== Early life and education ==
Philip Caryl Jessup was born on January 5, 1897, in New York, New York. He was the grandson of Henry Harris Jessup. In 1919, he received his undergraduate A.B. degree from Hamilton College. In 1924, he received a law degree (LLB) from Yale Law School. In 1927, he received a doctorate from Columbia University.

== Career ==
=== Academia ===
From 1925 to 1961, Jessup held teaching positions at Columbia University. While pursuing his doctorate, and for a good time thereafter (1925–1946), Jessup served as a lecturer and professor in international law at Columbia Law School. From 1942 to 1944, he served as assistant director of the Naval School of Military Government and Administration at Columbia University.In 1946, he was named the Hamilton Fish Professor of International Law and Diplomacy at Columbia Law, a post he held until 1961.

In 1970, he was Sibley lecturer at University of Georgia's School of Law in Athens, Georgia. In 1971, he was Barnette Miller Lecturer at Wellesley College.

=== Public sector: civil service ===
In 1924, Jessup became an assistant solicitor for the United States Department of State. In 1929, he assisted Elihu Root for the Conference of Jurists on the Permanent Court of International Justice in Geneva, Switzerland.

In 1943, Jessup served as assistant secretary-general of the United Nations Relief and Rehabilitation Administration (UNRRA) conference through 1944. From 1943 to 1945, he also served as chief of the Division of Personnel and Training for Foreign Relief and Rehabilitation Operations at the State Department. In 1944, he also served at the United Nations Monetary and Financial Conference (the "Bretton Woods" conference). In 1945, he was a technical advisor to the American delegation to the San Francisco United Nations charter conference in 1945 (whose Acting Secretary was Alger Hiss). In 1947, he served as U.S. representative to the United Nations Committee on Codification of International Law. From 1948 through 1952, he served in several roles at the United Nations: U.S. representative to the General Assembly (second, third, and fourth special sessions), deputy U.S. representative to the Interim Committee of the General Assembly and Security Council, and deputy chief of the U.S. Mission to the United Nations.

From 1949 to 1953, he also served as "Ambassador-at-large." As Ambassador, Jessup served on the 1949 U.S. delegation of the Sixth Session of the Paris Council of Foreign Ministers Meeting. Charles W. Yost was his assistant. The two continued to work together in Washington, researching and writing the 1949 Department of State White Paper, officially entitled “United States Relations with China.”

In 1960, Jessup was elected to become a member of the International Court of Justice at the Hague, where from 1961 to 1970 he served as a judge.

=== Institute of Pacific Relations ===
From 1938 to 1951, Jessup served as chairman of the Pacific Council and member of its parent, Institute of Pacific Relations.

By 1948, he had become a trustee of the Carnegie Endowment for International Peace, which continued at least through 1956.

From 1967 to 1986, he served as chairman of the Chile-Norway Permanent Commission and as an honorary member of the Governing Council for the International Institute for Unification of Private Law.

From 1970 to 1971, he was a Whitney H. Shepardson senior research fellow in residence at the Council on Foreign Relations.

== Second Red Scare ==
Jessup became a primary target of Senator Joseph McCarthy, who charged in the 1950 Tydings Committee hearings that Jessup was a security risk who had "an unusual affinity... for Communist causes." McCarthy was not allowed by the Tydings Committee to outline his case regarding Jessup, but the committee allowed Jessup to fly in from Pakistan and give his defense. Jessup was subsequently cleared of all charges by the Loyalty Board of the State Department and the Tydings Committee, and McCarthy was rebuked by many fellow senators and other statesmen. However, in two speeches on the floor of the Senate, McCarthy gave his evidence regarding Jessup's "unusual affinity for Communist causes:"

- That Jessup had been affiliated with five Communist front groups
- That Jessup had been a leading light in the Institute of Pacific Relations (IPR) at a time that organization was reflecting the Communist Party's line
- That he had "pioneered the smear campaign against Nationalist China and Chiang Kai-shek" and propagated the "myth of the 'democratic Chinese Communist'" through the IPR magazine, Far Eastern Survey, over which he had "absolute control"
- That Jessup had associated with known Communists in the IPR
- That the IPR's American Council under Jessup's guidance had received more than $7,000 of Communist funds from Frederick Vanderbilt Field
- That Jessup had "expressed vigorous opposition" to attempts to investigate Communist penetration of the IPR
- That Jessup had urged that United States atom bomb production be brought to a halt in 1946, and that essential atomic ingredients be "dumped into the ocean"
- That Jessup had appeared as a character witness for Alger Hiss and that after Hiss's conviction, Jessup had found "no reason whatever to change his opinion about Hiss's veracity, loyalty and integrity"

McCarthy's allegations severely damaged Jessup's reputation and career.

Nonetheless, US President Harry S. Truman appointed Jessup as United States delegate to the United Nations in 1951. However, when the appointment came before the Senate, it was not approved, largely because of McCarthy's influence. Truman circumvented the Senate by assigning Jessup to the United Nations on an "interim appointment."

Shortly after John F. Kennedy took office as president, the State Department approved the appointment of Jessup as U.S. candidate for the International Court of Justice, a post that did not need Senate confirmation. He served from 1961 to 1970.

Upon returning from the Netherlands, Jessup took up a series of academic positions at the University of Georgia School of Law, Columbia University, and Wellesley College.

== Personal life and legacy ==
In 1921, Jessup married Lois Walcott Kellogg. Jessup died on January 31, 1986, in Newtown, Pennsylvania. Jessup is the uncle of television writer Ted Jessup.

=== Honors ===
Jessup was elected to the American Academy of Arts and Sciences in 1932 and the American Philosophical Society in 1939. An international law moot court competition, the Philip C. Jessup International Law Moot Court Competition, is named in Jessup's honor. It is held annually in Washington D.C. and is attended by law students from around the world.

== Works ==
- The Law of Territorial Waters and Maritime Jurisdiction (G.A. Jennings Co., 1927)
- Elihu Root (Dodd, Mead & Co., 1938)
- A Modern Law of Nations (Macmillan Co., 1948)
- Transnational Law (Yale University Press, 1956)
- Controls for Outer Space and the Antarctic Analogy (With Howard Taubenfeld, Columbia University Press, 1959)
- The Price of International Justice (1971)
- The Birth of Nations (Columbia University Press, 1974)
