= Quercus lenticellata =

Conservation status
- Endangered (IUCN 3.1)

Scientific classification
- Kingdom: Plantae
- Clade: Embryophytes
- Clade: Tracheophytes
- Clade: Spermatophytes
- Clade: Angiosperms
- Clade: Eudicots
- Clade: Rosids
- Order: Fagales
- Family: Fagaceae
- Genus: Quercus
- Subgenus: Quercus subg. Cerris
- Section: Quercus sect. Cyclobalanopsis
- Species: Q. lenticellata

Binomial name
- Quercus lenticellata Barnett

Synonyms
- Cyclobalanopsis lenticellata (Barnett) Hjelmq.

Species of flowering plant

Quercus lenticellata is a species of oak. It is a tree endemic to northern Thailand. Three widely scattered populations are known, which grow in tropical mixed deciduous forest and lower montane rain forest, often near streams on granite bedrock, from 1,025 to 1,625 metres elevation.

The species was named by Euphemia Cowan Barnett in 1938.
