= Biblical Porn =

2018 book by Jessica Johnson

Biblical Porn: Affect, Labor, and Pastor Mark Driscoll's Evangelical Empire
- Author: Jessica Johnson
- Subject: Anthropology of Christianity
- Publisher: Duke University Press
- Publication date: May 2018
- ISBN: 978-0-8223-7136-6

Biblical Porn: Affect, Labor, and Pastor Mark Driscoll's Evangelical Empire is a 2018 book by Jessica Johnson about the culture of Mars Hill Church under the leadership of Mark Driscoll. Johnson is an anthropologist at the University of Washington in Seattle. The book uses research techniques including interviews with church leaders and members during the existence of the church. Publishers Weekly said it provided "seething critiques" of the male-focused, "muscular Christianity" espoused by the church but was "more an ethnography than a exposé of a megachurch's downfall". Foreword Reviews said it displayed "deep insight and an absence of judgment". A local Seattle review described it as a reminder of "toxic Christian masculinity" during a largely forgotten episode that is "almost impossible now to describe ... to someone who is new to Seattle". The author herself described the Seattle area as "definitely not immune to any of this" despite Seattle's "image" as progressive and irreligious.

== See also ==
- Anthropology of religion
- New religious movements in the Pacific Northwest
- Pacific Northwest § Spirituality and religion
