= Barnatt =

Barnatt is a surname. Notable people with the surname include:

- Luke Barnatt (born 1988), English mixed martial artist
- Nathan Barnatt (born 1981), American actor, comedian, dancer, YouTuber, and filmmaker

== See also ==
- Barnett
