= Maud Smith =

Maud Smith may refer to:

- Maud Smith, character in Almost a Rescue
- Maud Smith, character in Shadazzle
- Maud Smith (figure skater) in North American Figure Skating Championships
