= Themes in Avatar =

Academic analyses of Avatar

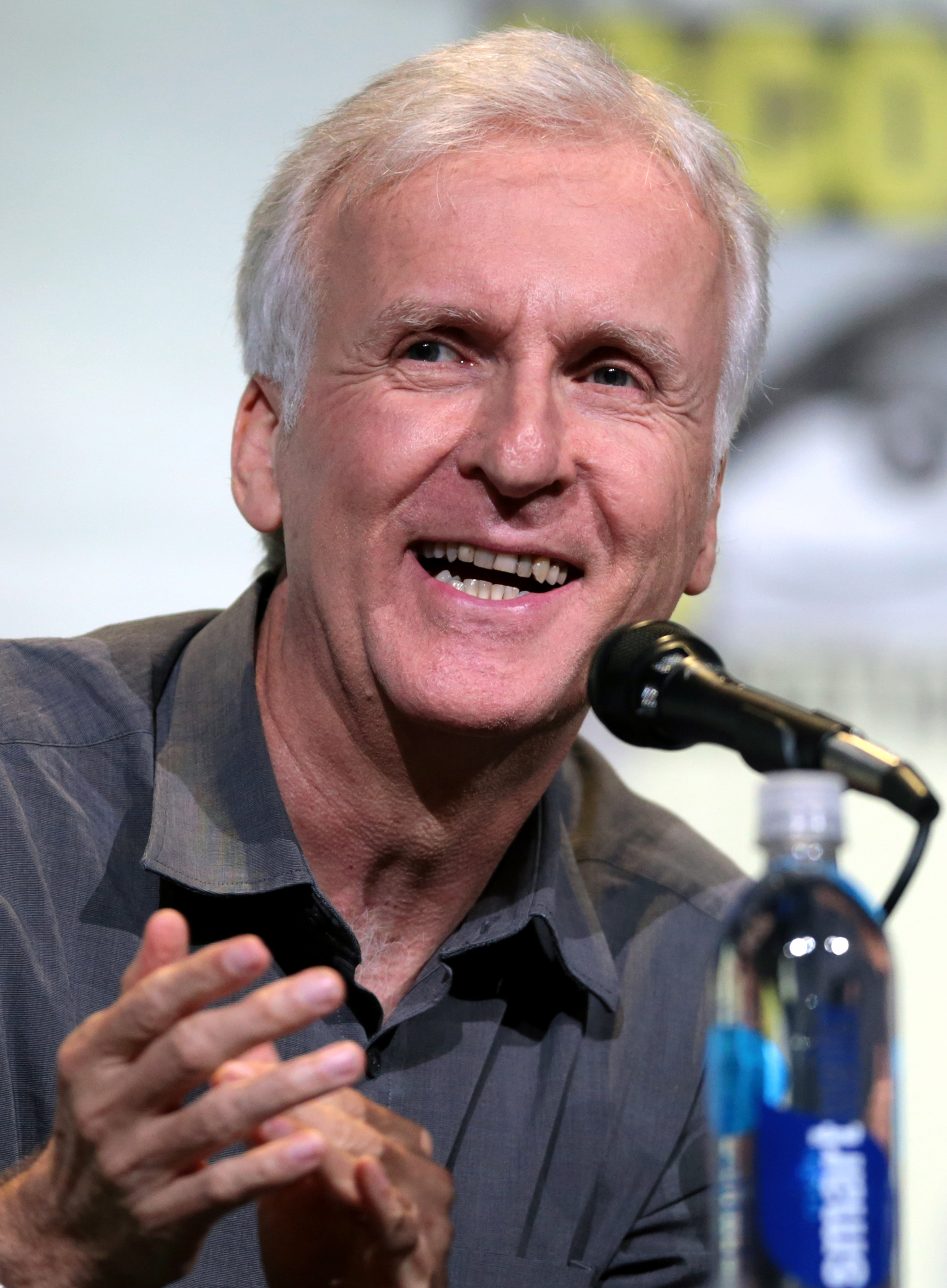
James Cameron, writer and director of Avatar, at the 2016 San Diego Comic-Con

The 2009 American science fiction film Avatar has provoked vigorous discussion of a wide variety of cultural, social, political, and religious themes identified by critics and commentators, and the film's writer and director James Cameron has responded that he hoped to create an emotional reaction and to provoke public conversation about these topics. The broad range of Avatar's intentional or perceived themes has prompted some reviewers to call it "an all-purpose allegory" and "the season's ideological Rorschach blot". One reporter even suggested that the politically charged punditry has been "misplaced": reviewers should have seized on the opportunity to take "a break from their usual fodder of public policy and foreign relations" rather than making an ideological battlefield of this "popcorn epic".

Discussion has centered on such themes as the conflict between modern human and nature, and the film's treatment of colonialism, imperialism, racism, militarism and patriotism, corporate greed, property rights, spirituality and religion. Commentators have debated whether the film's treatment of the human aggression against the local Na'vi is a message of support for indigenous peoples today, or is, instead, a tired retelling of the racist myth of the noble savage. Right-wing critics accused Cameron of pushing an anti-American message in the film's depiction of a private military contractor that used ex-Marines to attack the locals, while Cameron and others argued that it is pro-American to question the propriety of the current wars in Iraq and Afghanistan. The visual similarity between the destruction of the World Trade Center and the felling of Home Tree in the film caused some filmgoers to further identify with the Na'vi and to identify the human military contractors as terrorists. Critics asked whether this comparison was intended to encourage audiences to empathize with the position of Muslims under military occupation today.

Much discussion has concerned the film's treatment of environmental protection and the parallels to, for example, the destruction of rainforests, mountaintop removal for mining and evictions from homes for development. The title of the film and various visual and story elements provoked discussion of the film's use of Hindu iconography, which Cameron confirmed had inspired him. Some Christians, including the Vatican, worried that the film promotes pantheism over Christian beliefs, while others instead thought that it sympathetically explores biblical concepts. Other critics either praised the film's spiritual elements or found them hackneyed.

== Political themes ==
=== Colonialism and imperialism ===
"Avatar is a science fiction retelling of the history of North and South America in the early colonial period. Avatar very pointedly made reference to the colonial period in the Americas, with all its conflict and bloodshed between the military aggressors from Europe and the indigenous peoples. Europe equals Earth. The native Americans are the Na’vi. It’s not meant to be subtle."

— James Cameron on Avatar

Avatar describes the conflict by an indigenous people, the Na'vi of Pandora, against the oppression of alien humans. Director James Cameron acknowledged that the film is "certainly about imperialism in the sense that the way human history has always worked is that people with more military or technological might tend to supplant or destroy people who are weaker, usually for their resources." Critics agreed that the film is "a clear message about dominant, aggressive cultures subjugating a native population in a quest for resources or riches." George Monbiot, writing in The Guardian, asserted that conservative criticism of Avatar is a reaction to what he called the film's "chilling metaphor" for the European "genocides in the Americas", which "massively enriched" Europe. Cameron told National Public Radio that references to the colonial period are in the film "by design". Adam Cohen of The New York Times stated that the film is "firmly in the anti-imperialist canon, a 22nd-century version of the American colonists vs. the British, India vs. the Raj, or Latin America vs. United Fruit."

Saritha Prabhu, an Indian-born columnist for The Tennessean, wrote about the parallels between the plot and how "Western power colonizes and invades the indigenous people (native Americans, Eastern countries, you substitute the names), sees the natives as primitives/savages/uncivilized, is unable or unwilling to see the merits in a civilization that has been around longer, loots the weaker power, all while thinking it is doing a favor to the poor natives." David Brooks, in The New York Times, criticized what he saw as the "White Messiah complex" in the film, whereby the Na'vi "can either have their history shaped by cruel imperialists or benevolent ones, but either way, they are going to be supporting actors in our journey to self-admiration." Others disagree: "First off, [Jake is] handicapped. Second off, he ultimately becomes one of [the Na'vi] and wins their way."

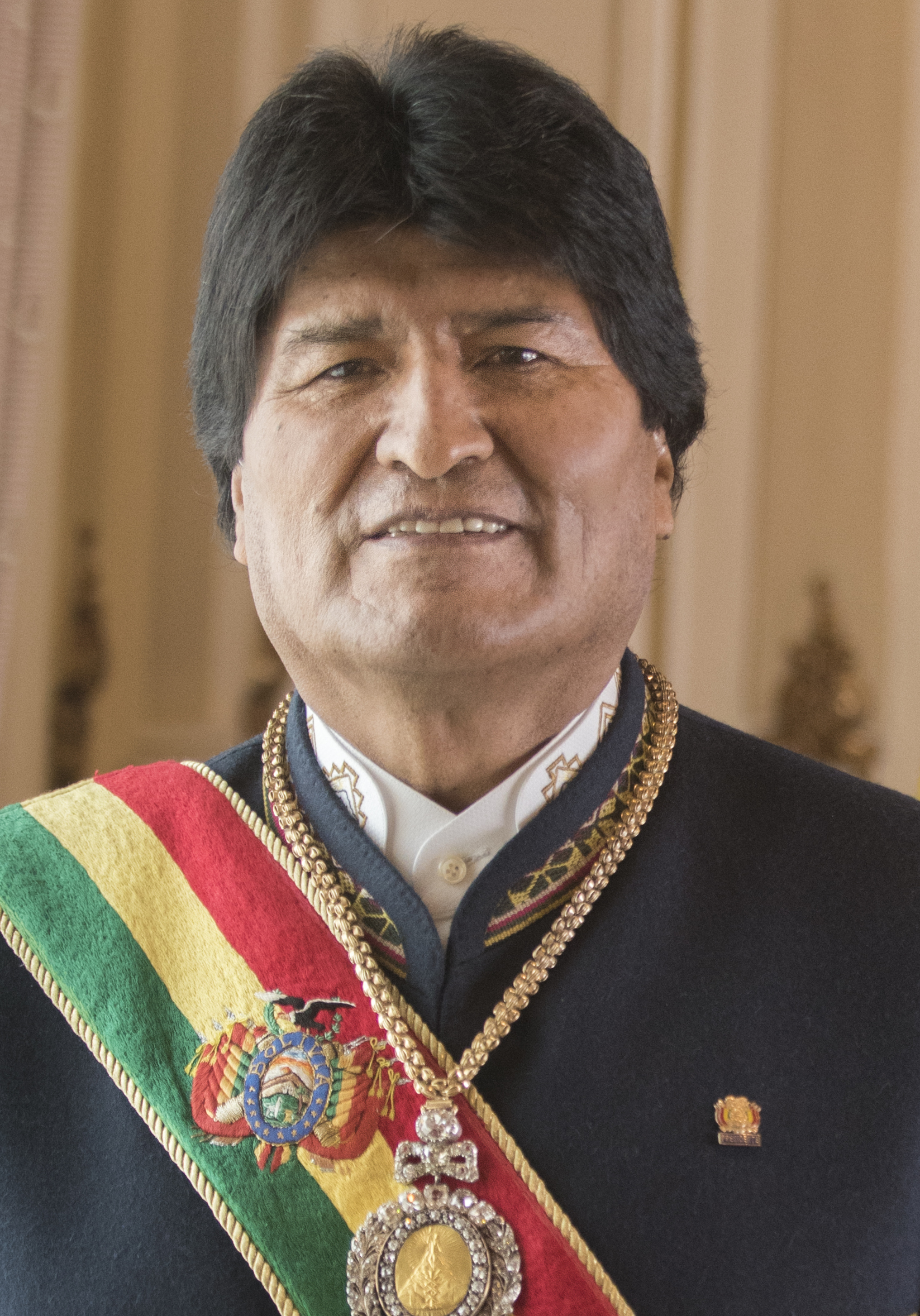
Bolivian President Evo Morales praised Avatar for "resistance to capitalism" and the "defense of nature".

Many commentators saw the film as a message of support for the struggles of indigenous peoples today. Evo Morales, the first indigenous president of Bolivia, praised Avatar for its "profound show of resistance to capitalism and the struggle for the defense of nature". Others compared the human invaders with "NATO in Iraq or Israel in Palestine", and considered it reassuring that "when the Na'vi clans are united, and a sincere prayer is offered, the ... 'primitive savages' win the war." Palestinian activists painted themselves blue and dressed like the Na'vi during their weekly protest in the village of Bilin against Israel's separation barrier. Other Arab writers, however, noted that "for Palestinians, Avatar is rather a reaffirmation and confirmation of the claims about their incapability to lead themselves and build their own future." Forbes columnist Reihan Salam criticized the vilification of capitalism in the film, asserting that it represents a more noble and heroic way of life than that led by the Na'vi, because it "give[s] everyone an opportunity to learn, discover, and explore, and to change the world around us." Si Sheppard on the other hand praised the film for drawing parallels between the corporate imperialism of the fictional RDA and its historical equivalents of the pre-industrial era (specifically the East India Company, which maintained its own private army in order to impose profit-driven territorial sovereignty on the Indian subcontinent).

=== Militarism ===
Cameron stated that Avatar is "very much a political film" and added: "This movie reflects that we are living through war. There are boots on the ground, troops who I personally believe were sent there under false pretenses, so I hope this will be part of opening our eyes." He confirmed that "the Iraq stuff and the Vietnam stuff is there by design", adding that he did not think that the film was anti-military. Critic Charles Marowitz in Swans magazine remarked, however, that the realism of the suggested parallel with wars in Iraq, Iran, and Afghanistan "doesn't quite jell" because the locals are "peace-loving and empathetic".

Cameron said that Americans have a "moral responsibility" to understand the impact of their country's recent military conflicts. Commenting on the term "shock and awe" in the film, Cameron said: "We know what it feels like to launch the missiles. We don't know what it feels like for them to land on our home soil, not in America." Christian Hamaker of Crosswalk.com noted that, "in describing the military assault on Pandora, Cameron cribs terminology from the ongoing war on terrorism and puts it in the mouths of the film's villains ... as they 'fight terror with terror'. Cameron's sympathies, and the movie's, clearly are with the Na'vi—and against the military and corporate men." A columnist in the Russian newspaper Vedomosti traced Avatar's popularity to its giving the audience a chance to make a moral choice between good and evil and, by emotionally siding with Jake's treason, to relieve "us the scoundrels" of our collective guilt for the cruel and unjust world that we have created. Armond White of New York Press dismissed the film as "essentially a sentimental cartoon with a pacifist, naturalist message" that uses villainous Americans to misrepresent the facts of the military, capitalism, and imperialism. Answering critiques of the film as insulting to the U.S. military, a piece in the Los Angeles Times asserted that "if any U.S. forces that ever existed were being insulted, it was the ones who fought under George Armstrong Custer, not David Petraeus or Stanley McChrystal." Other reviews saw Avatar as "the bubbling up of our military subconscious ... the wish to be free of all the paperwork and risk aversion of the modern Army—much more fun to fly, unarmored, on a winged beast."

A critic writing in Le Monde opined that, contrary to the perceived pacifism of Avatar, the film justifies war in the response to attack by the film's positive characters, particularly the American protagonist who encourages the Na'vi to "follow him into battle. ... Every war, even those that seem the most insane [are justified as being] for the 'right reasons'." Ann Marlowe of Forbes saw the film as both pro- and anti-military, "a metaphor for the networked military".

=== Anti-Americanism ===
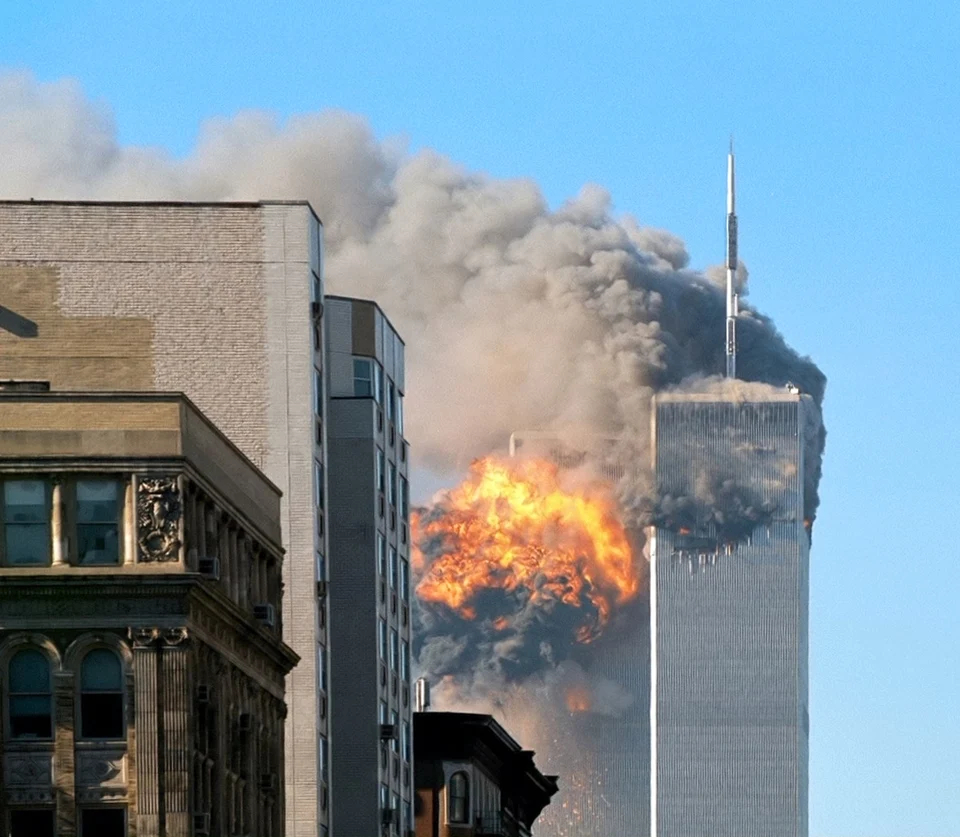
Reviewers compared the falling of Home Tree with the destruction of the World Trade Center.

Many reviewers perceived an anti-American message in the film, equating RDA's private security force to the U.S. military. Commentator Glenn Beck on his radio show said that Avatar was "an anti‑U.S. human thing". Russell D. Moore in The Christian Post stated that, "If you can get a theater full of people in Kentucky to stand and applaud the defeat of their country in war, then you've got some amazing special effects" and criticized Cameron for what he saw as an unnuanced depiction of the American military as "pure evil". John Podhoretz of The Weekly Standard argued that Avatar revealed "hatred of the military and American institutions and the notion that to be human is just way uncool." Charles Mudede of The Stranger commented that with the release of the film "the American culture industry exports an anti-American spectacle to an anti-American world." Debbie Schlussel likewise dismissed Avatar as "cinema for the hate America crowd".

Cameron argued that "the film is definitely not anti-American" and that "part of being an American is having the freedom to have dissenting ideas." Eric Ditzian of MTV concurred that "it'd take a great leap of logic to tag 'Avatar' as anti-American or anti-capitalist." Ann Marlowe called the film "the most neo-con movie ever made" for its "deeply conservative, pro-American message". But Cameron admitted to some ambiguity on the issue, agreeing that "the bad guys could be America in this movie, or the good guys could be America in this movie, depending on your perspective", and stated that Avatar's defeat at the Academy Awards might have been due to the perceived anti-U.S. theme in it.

The destruction of the Na'vi habitat Hometree reminded commentators of the September 11 attack on the World Trade Center, and one commentator noted Cameron's "audacious willingness to question the sacred trauma of 9/11". Cameron said that he was "surprised at how much it did look like September 11", but added that he did not think that it was necessarily a bad thing. A French critic wrote: "How can one not see the analogy with the collapse of the towers of the World Trade Center? Then, after that spectacular scene, all is justified [for the unified] indigenous peoples (the allied forces) ... to kill those who [are] just like terrorists." Another writer noted that "the U.S.' stand-ins are the perpetrators, and not the victims" and described this reversal as "the movie’s most seditious act".

== Social and cultural themes ==
=== Civilization and race ===
Commentators around the world sought to interpret the relationship between the Na'vi and humans in the film, mostly agreeing with Maxim Osipov, who wrote in the Hindustan Times and The Sydney Morning Herald: "The 'civilised humans' turn out as primitive, jaded and increasingly greedy, cynical, and brutal—traits only amplified by their machinery—while the 'monkey aliens' emerge as noble, kind, wise, sensitive and humane. We, along with the Avatar hero, are now faced with an uncomfortable yet irresistible choice between the two races and the two worldviews." Osipov wrote that it was inevitable that the audience, like the film's hero, Jake, would find that the Na'vi's culture was really the more civilized of the two, exemplifying "the qualities of kindness, gratitude, regard for the elder, self-sacrifice, respect for all life and ultimately humble dependence on a higher intelligence behind nature." Echoing this analysis, psychologist Jeffery Fine in The Miami Herald urged "every man, woman and child" to see the film and wake up to its message by making the right choice between commercial materialism, which is "steamrolling our soul and consciousness", and reconnection with all life as "the only ... promise of survival" for humanity. Similarly, Altino Matos writing for Journal de Angola saw the film as a message of hope, writing, "With this union of humans and aliens comes a feeling that something better exists in the universe: the respect for life." Cameron confirmed that "the Na'vi represent the better aspects of human nature, and the human characters in the film demonstrate the more venal aspects of human nature."

Conversely, David Brooks of The New York Times opined that Avatar creates "a sort of two-edged cultural imperialism", an offensive cultural stereotype that white people are rationalist and technocratic while colonial victims are spiritual and athletic and that illiteracy is the path to grace. A review in the Irish Independent found the film to contrast a "mix of New Age environmentalism and the myth of the Noble Savage" with the corruption of the "civilized" white man. Reihan Salam, writing in Forbes, viewed it as ironic that "Cameron has made a dazzling, gorgeous indictment of the kind of society that produces James Camerons."

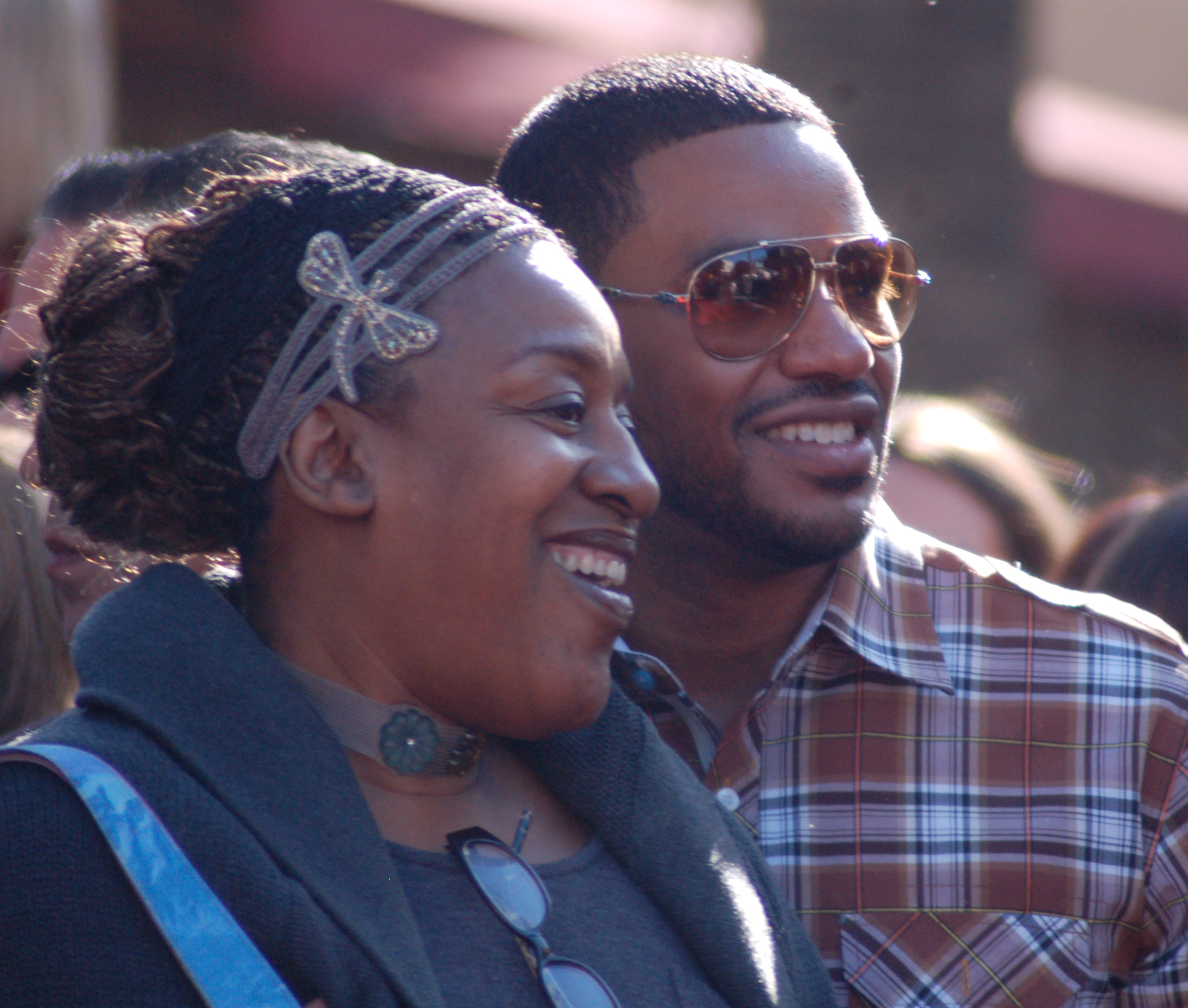
All the Na'vi characters were played by actors of color, including C. C. H. Pounder and Laz Alonso.

Many critics saw racist undertones in the film's treatment of the indigenous Na'vi, seeing it as "a fantasy about race told from the point of view of white people", which reinforces "the White Messiah fable", in which the white hero saves helpless primitive locals, who are reduced to servicing his ambitions and proving his heroism. Other reviews called Avatar an offensive assumption that nonwhites need the White Messiah to lead their crusades, and "a self-loathing racist screed" due to the fact that all the "human" roles in the film are played by white actors and all the Na'vi characters by African-American or Native American actors.

Māori academic Rawiri Taonui agreed that the film portrays indigenous people as being simplistic and unable to defend themselves without the help from "the white guys and the neo-liberals." Another author remarked that while the white man will fix the destruction, he will never feel guilty, even though he is directly responsible for the destruction." Likewise, Josef Joffe, publisher-editor of Die Zeit in Germany, said the film perpetuates the myth of the "noble savage" and has "a condescending, yes, even racist message. Cameron bows to the noble savages. However, he reduces them to dependents." Slavoj Žižek argued that "the film enables us to practise a typical ideological division: sympathising with the idealised aborigines while rejecting their actual struggle." The Irish Times carried the comment that "despite all the thematic elements from Hinduism, one thing truly original is the good old American ego. Given its Hollywood origins, the script has remained faithful to the inherent superiority complex, and has predictably bestowed the honor of the 'avatar' not on the movie’s native Na’vis, but on a white American marine." Similarly, positing that "the only good humans [in the film] are dead—or rather, resurrected as 'good Navi'", a writer in The Jerusalem Post thought that the film was inadvertently promoting supremacy of one race over another.

On the Charlie Rose talk show, Cameron acknowledged parallels with idea of the "noble savage", but argued: "When indigenous populations who are at a bow and arrow level are met with technological superior forces, [if] somebody doesn't help them, they lose. So we are not talking about a racial group within an existing population fighting for their rights." Cameron rejected claims that the film is racist, asserting that Avatar is about respecting others' differences. Adam Cohen of The New York Times felt similarly, writing that the Na'vi greeting "I see you" contrasts with the oppression of, and even genocide against, those who we fail to accept for what they are, citing Jewish ghettos and the Soviet gulags as examples.

=== Environment and property ===
Avatar has been called "without a doubt the most epic piece of environmental advocacy ever captured on celluloid.... The film hits all the important environmental talking-points—virgin rain forests threatened by wanton exploitation, indigenous peoples who have much to teach the developed world, a planet which functions as a collective, interconnected Gaia-istic organism, and evil corporate interests that are trying to destroy it all." Cameron has spoken extensively with the media about the film's environmental message, saying that he envisioned Avatar as a broader metaphor of how we treat the natural world. He said that he created Pandora as "a fictionalised fantasy version of what our world was like, before we started to pave it and build malls, and shopping centers. So it's really an evocation of the world we used to have." He told Charlie Rose that "we are going to go through a lot of pain and heartache if we don't acknowledge our stewardship responsibilities to nature." Interviewed by Terry Gross of National Public Radio, he called Avatar a satire on the sense of human entitlement: "[Avatar] is saying our attitude about indigenous people and our entitlement about what is rightfully theirs is the same sense of entitlement that lets us bulldoze a forest and not blink an eye. It's just human nature that if we can take it, we will. And sometimes we do it in a very naked and imperialistic way, and other times we do it in a very sophisticated way with lots of rationalization—but it's basically the same thing. A sense of entitlement. And we can't just go on in this unsustainable way, just taking what we want and not giving back." An article in the Belgium paper De Standaard agreed: "It's about the brutality of man, who shamelessly takes what isn't his."

Commentators connected the film's story to the endangerment of biodiversity in the Amazon rainforests of Brazil. A Newsweek piece commented on the destruction of Home Tree as resembling the rampant tree-felling in Tibet, while another article compared the film's depiction of destructive corporate mining for unobtainium in the Na'vi lands with the mining and milling of uranium near the Navajo reservation in New Mexico. Other critics, however, dismissed Avatar's pro-environmental stance as inconsistent. Armond White remarked that, "Cameron’s really into the powie-zowie factor: destructive combat and the deployment of technological force. ... Cameron fashionably denounces the same economic and military system that make his technological extravaganza possible. It’s like condemning NASA—yet joyriding on the Mars Exploration Rover." Similarly, an article in National Review concluded that by resorting to technology for educating viewers of the technology endangered world of Pandora, the film "showcases the contradictions of organic liberalism."

Stating that such a conservative criticism of his film's "strong environmental anti-war themes" was not unexpected, Cameron stressed that he was "interested in saving the world that my children are going to inhabit", encouraged everyone to be a "tree hugger", and urged that we "make a fairly rapid transition to alternate energy." The film and Cameron's environmental activism caught the attention of the 8,000-strong Dangaria Kandha tribe from Odisha, eastern India. They appealed to him to help them stop a mining company from opening a bauxite open-cast mine, on their sacred Niyamgiri mountain, in an advertisement in Variety that read: "Avatar is fantasy ... and real. The Dongria Kondh ... are struggling to defend their land against a mining company hell-bent on destroying their sacred mountain. Please help...." Similarly, a coalition of over fifty environmental and aboriginal organizations of Canada ran a full-page ad in the special Oscar edition of Variety likening their fight against Canada's Alberta oilsands to the Na'vi insurgence, —a comparison the mining and oil companies objected to. Cameron was awarded the inaugural Temecula Environment Award for Outstanding Social Responsibility in Media by three environmentalist groups for portrayal of environmental struggles that they compared with their own.

The destruction of the Na'vi habitat to make way for mining operations has also evoked parallels with the oppressive policies of some states often involving forcible evictions related to development. David Boaz of the libertarian Cato Institute wrote in Los Angeles Times that the film's essential conflict is a battle over property rights, "the foundation of the free market and indeed of civilization." Melinda Liu found this storyline reminiscent of the policies of the authorities in China, where 30 million citizens have been evicted in the course of a three-decade long development boom. Others saw similar links to the displacement of tribes in the Amazon basin and the forcible demolition of private houses in a Moscow suburb.

== Religion and spirituality ==
Avatar comes from a childhood sense of wonder about nature... You fly in your dreams as a child, but you tend not to fly in your dreams as an adult. In the Avatar state, [Jake] is getting to return to that childlike dream state of doing amazing things.

— James Cameron

David Quinn of the Irish Independent wrote that the spirituality depicted "goes some way towards explaining the film's gigantic popularity, and that is the fact that Avatar is essentially a religious film, even if Cameron might not have intended it as such." At the same time, Jonah Goldberg of National Review Online objected to what he saw in the film reviews as "the norm to speak glowingly of spirituality but derisively of traditional religion."

James Cameron has said that he "tried to make a film that would touch people's spirituality across the broad spectrum." He also stated that one of the film's philosophical underpinnings is that "the Na'vi represent that sort of aspirational part of ourselves that wants to be better, that wants to respect nature, while the humans in the film represent the more venal versions of ourselves, the banality of evil that comes with corporate decisions that are made out of remove of the consequences." Film director John Boorman saw a similar dichotomy as a key factor contributing to its success: "Perhaps the key is the marine in the wheelchair. He is disabled, but Mr Cameron and technology can transport him into the body of a beautiful, athletic, sexual, being. After all, we are all disabled in one way or another; inadequate, old, broken, earthbound. Pandora is a kind of heaven where we can be resurrected and connected instead of disconnected and alone."

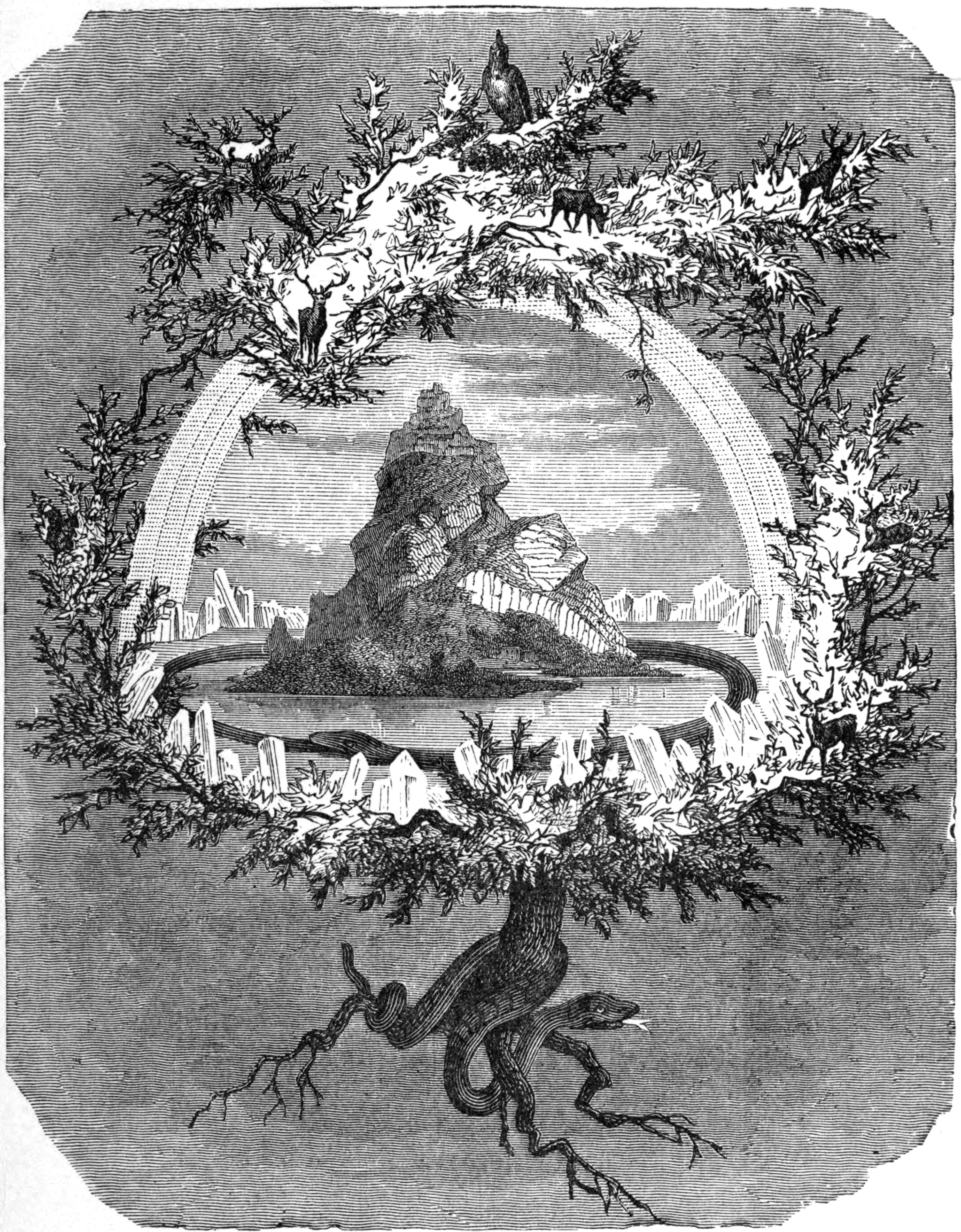
Reviewers likened the Tree of Souls to Yggdrasil, a world tree pivotal to Norse cosmology.

=== Religions and mythology ===
Reviewers suggested that the film draws upon many existing religious and mythological motifs. Vern Barnet of the Charlotte Observer opined that Avatar poses a great question of faith—should the creation be seen and governed hierarchically, from above, or ecologically, through mutual interdependence? He also noted that the film borrows concepts from other religions and compared its Tree of Souls with the Norse story of the tree Yggdrasil, also called axis mundi or the center of the world, whose destruction signals the collapse of the universe. Malinda Liu in Newsweek likened the Na'vi respect for life and belief in reincarnation with Tibetan religious beliefs and practices, but Reihan Salam of Forbes called the species "perhaps the most sanctimonious humanoids ever portrayed on film."

A Bolivian writer defined "avatar" as "something born without human intervention, without intercourse, without sin", comparing it to the births of Jesus, Krishna, Manco Cápac, and Mama Ocllo and drew parallels between the deity Eywa of Pandora and the goddess Pachamama worshiped by the indigenous people of the Andes. Others suggested that the world of Pandora mirrored the Garden of Eden, and reminded that in Hebrew Na'vi is the singular of Nevi'im which means "Prophets". A writer for Religion Dispatches countered that Avatar "begs, borrows, and steals from a variety of longstanding human stories, puts them through the grinder, and comes up with something new." Another commentator called Avatar "a new version of the Garden of Eden syndrome" pointing to what she viewed as phonetic and conceptual similarities of the film's terminology with that of the Book of Genesis.

=== Parallels with Hinduism ===
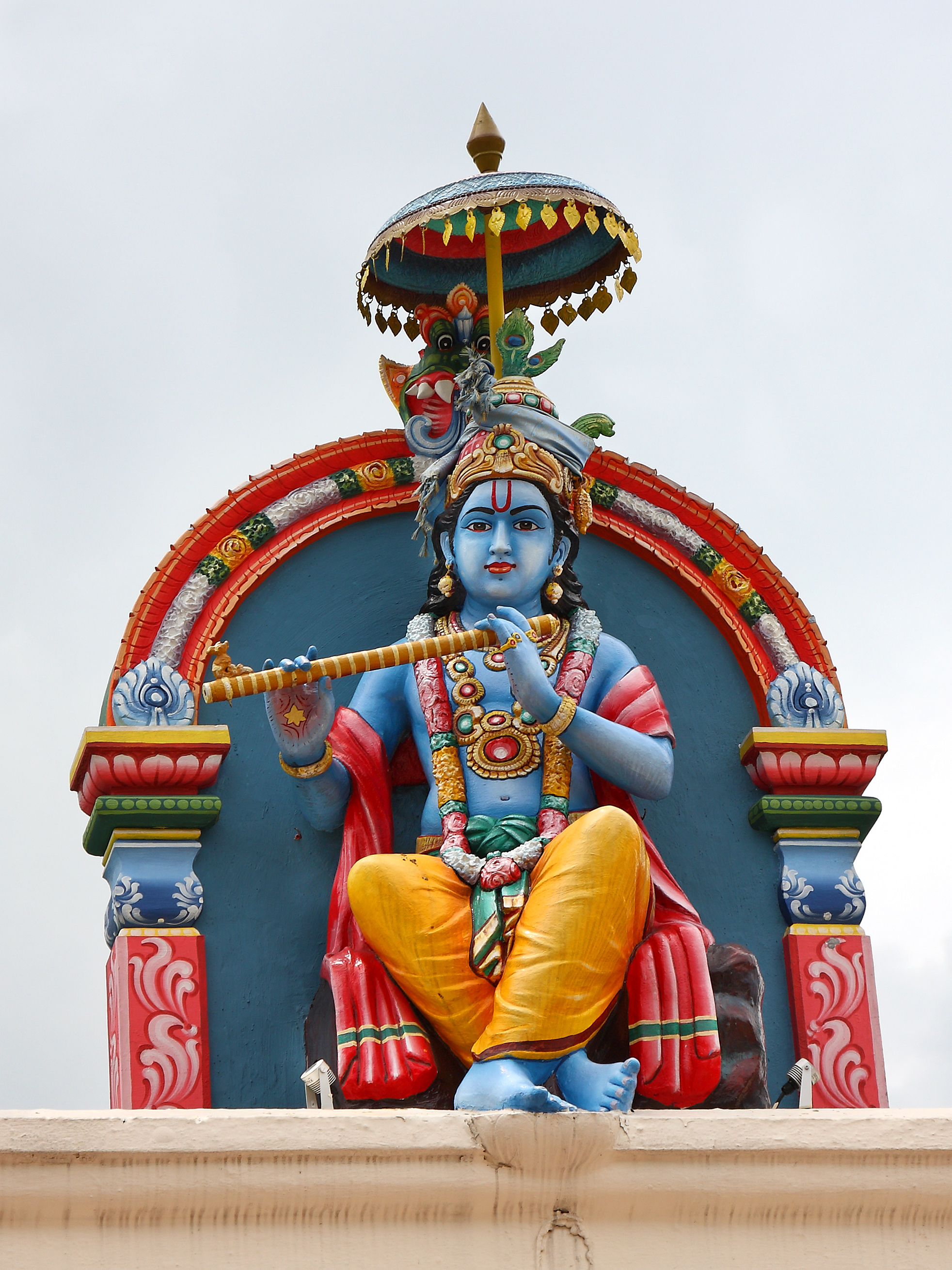
Krishna

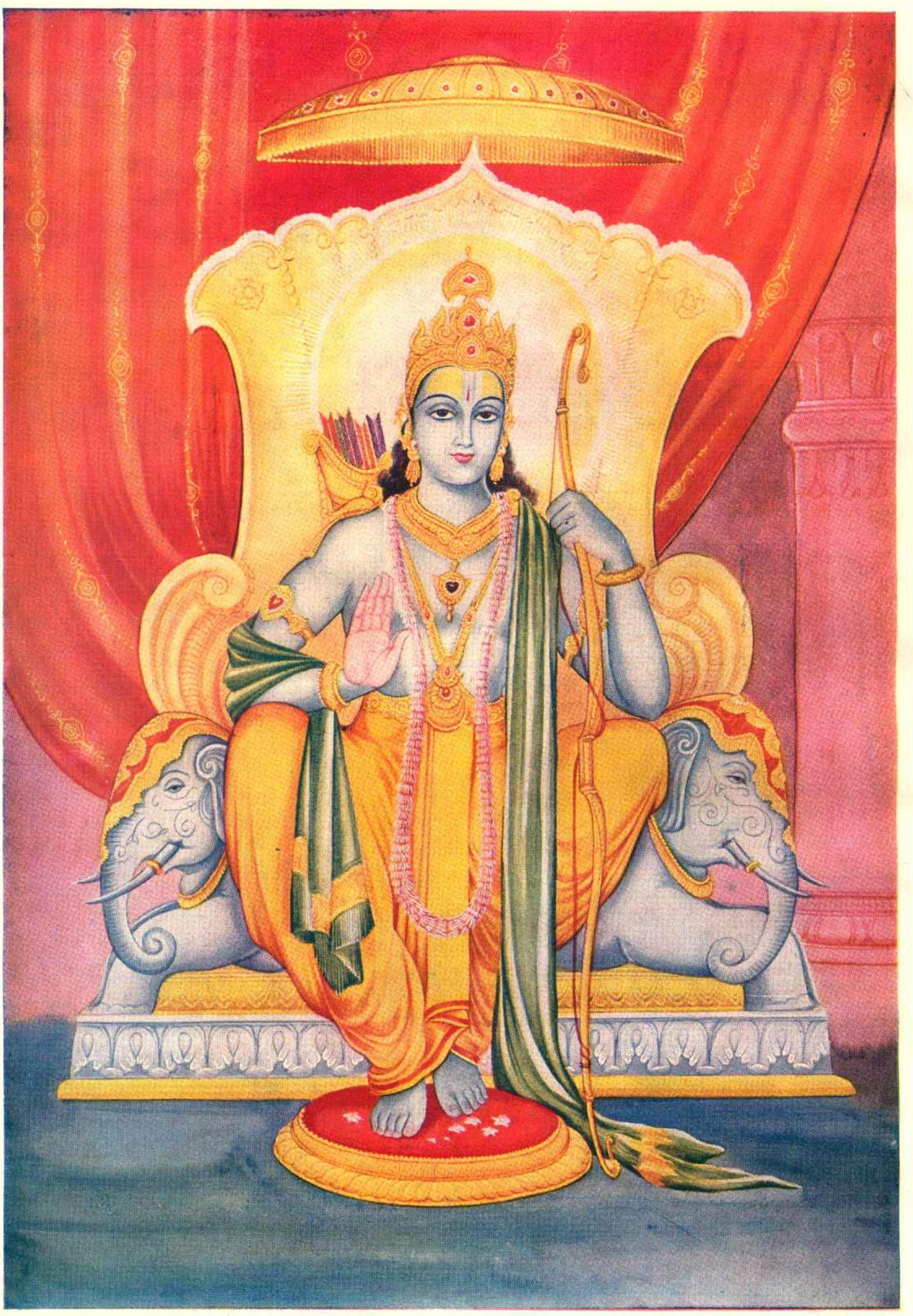
Rama the archer

Critics compared the Na'vi with Hindu gods such as Krishna and Rama, traditionally depicted with blue skin and tilak marks on their foreheads.

The Times of India suggested Avatar was a treatise on Indianism "for Indophiles and Indian philosophy enthusiasts", starting from the very word Avatar itself. A Houston Chronicle piece critiqued the film in terms of the ancient Hindu epics Ramayana and Mahabharata, commenting on the Na'vi visual similarity with Rama and Krishna—avatars central to the respective epics and traditionally depicted with blue skin, black hair, and a tilak mark on the forehead. Another critic found that elements of the film's plot resembled such teachings and concepts of Hinduism as reincarnation of the soul, ecological consciousness, and incarnations of deities on Earth, commending Avatar and its director for "raising the global stature of Hinduism ... in months", while criticizing them for substantiating the western reluctance to accept anything oriental in its pristine form.

Cameron calls the connection a "subconscious" reference: "I have just loved ... the mythology, the entire Hindu pantheon, seems so rich and vivid." He continued, "I didn't want to reference the Hindu religion so closely, but the subconscious association was interesting, and I hope I haven't offended anyone in doing so." He has stated that he was familiar with a lot of beliefs of the Hindu religion and found it "quite fascinating".

Answering a question from Time magazine in 2007, "What is an Avatar anyway?" James Cameron replied, "It's an incarnation of one of the Hindu gods taking a flesh form. In this film what that means is that the human technology in the future is capable of injecting a human's intelligence into a remotely located body, a biological body." In 2010, Cameron confirmed the meaning of the title to the Times of India: "Of course, that was the significance in the film, although the characters are not divine beings. But the idea was that they take flesh in another body."

Following the film's release, reviewers focused on Cameron's choice of the religious Sanskrit term for the film's title. A reviewer in the Irish Times traced the term to the ten incarnations of Vishnu. Another writer for The Hindu concluded that by using the "loaded Sanskrit word" Cameron indicated the possibility that an encounter with an emotionally superior—but technologically inferior—form of alien may in the future become a next step in human evolution—provided we will learn to integrate and change, rather than conquer and destroy.

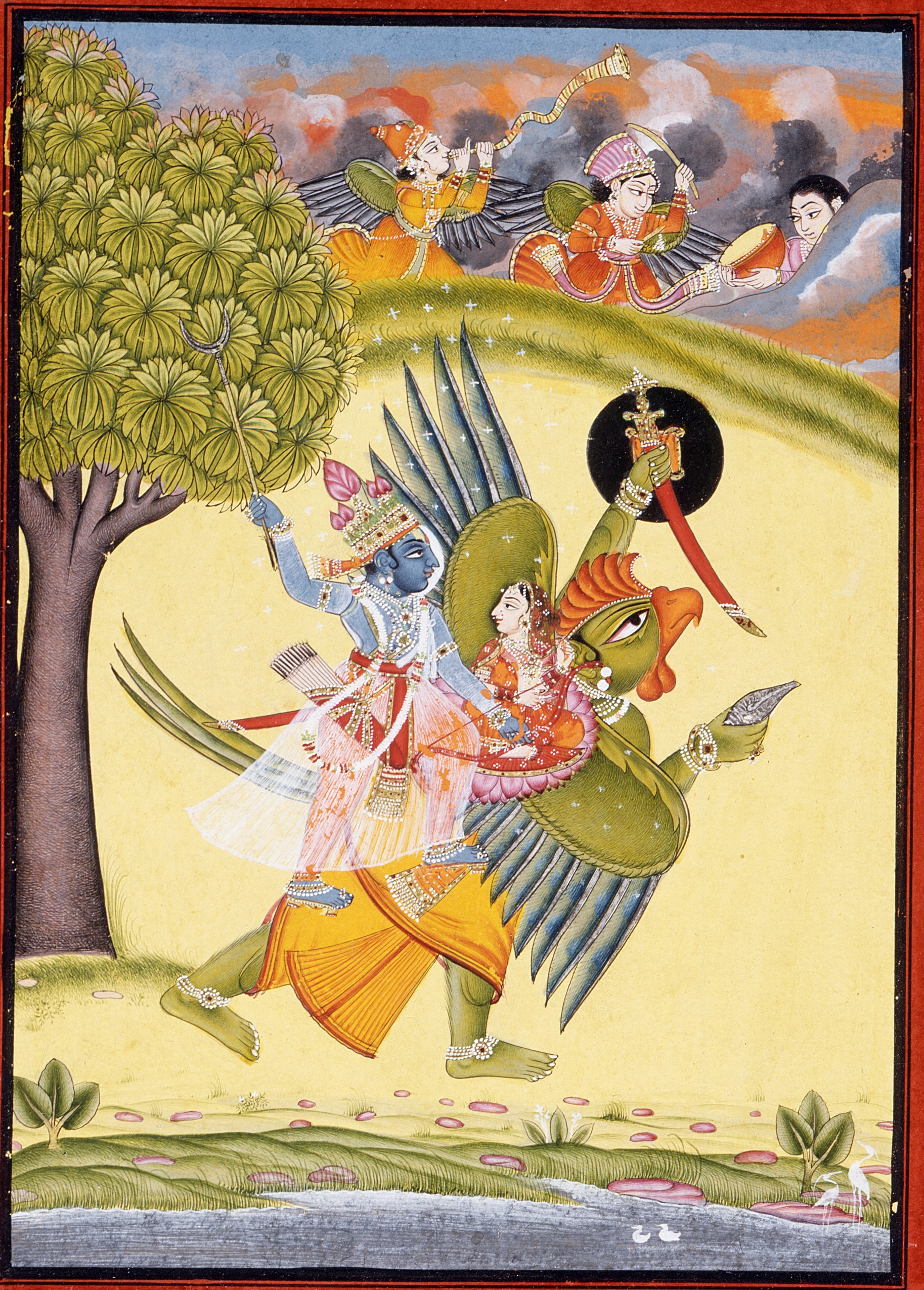
Vishnu and Lakshmi riding on the winged Garuda

Maxim Osipov of ISKCON argued in The Sydney Morning Herald that "Avatar" is a "downright misnomer" for the film because "the movie reverses the very concept [that] the term 'avatar'—literally, in Sanskrit, 'descent'—is based on. So much for a descending 'avatar', Jake becomes a refugee among the aborigines." Vern Barnet in Charlotte Observer likewise thought that the title insults traditional Hindu usage of the term since it is a human, not a god, who descends in the film. However, Rishi Bhutada, Houston coordinator of the Hindu American Foundation, stated that while there are certain sacred terms that would offend Hindus if used improperly, 'avatar' is not one of them. Texas-based filmmaker Ashok Rao added that 'avatar' does not always mean a representative of God on Earth, but simply one being in another form—especially in literature, moviemaking, poetry and other forms of art.

Explaining the choice of the color blue for the Na'vi, Cameron said "I just like blue. It's a good color ... plus, there's a connection to the Hindu deities, which I like conceptually." Commentators agreed that the blue skin of the Na'vi, described in a New Yorker article as "Vishnu-blue", "instantly and metaphorically" relates the film's protagonist to such avatars of Vishnu as Rama and Krishna. An article in the San Francisco Examiner described an 18th-century Indian painting of Vishnu and his consort Laksmi riding the great mythical bird Garuda as "Avatar prequel" due to its resemblance with the film's scene in which the hero's blue-skinned avatar flies a gigantic raptor. Asra Q. Nomani of The Daily Beast likened the hero and his Na'vi mate Neytiri to images of Shiva and Durga.

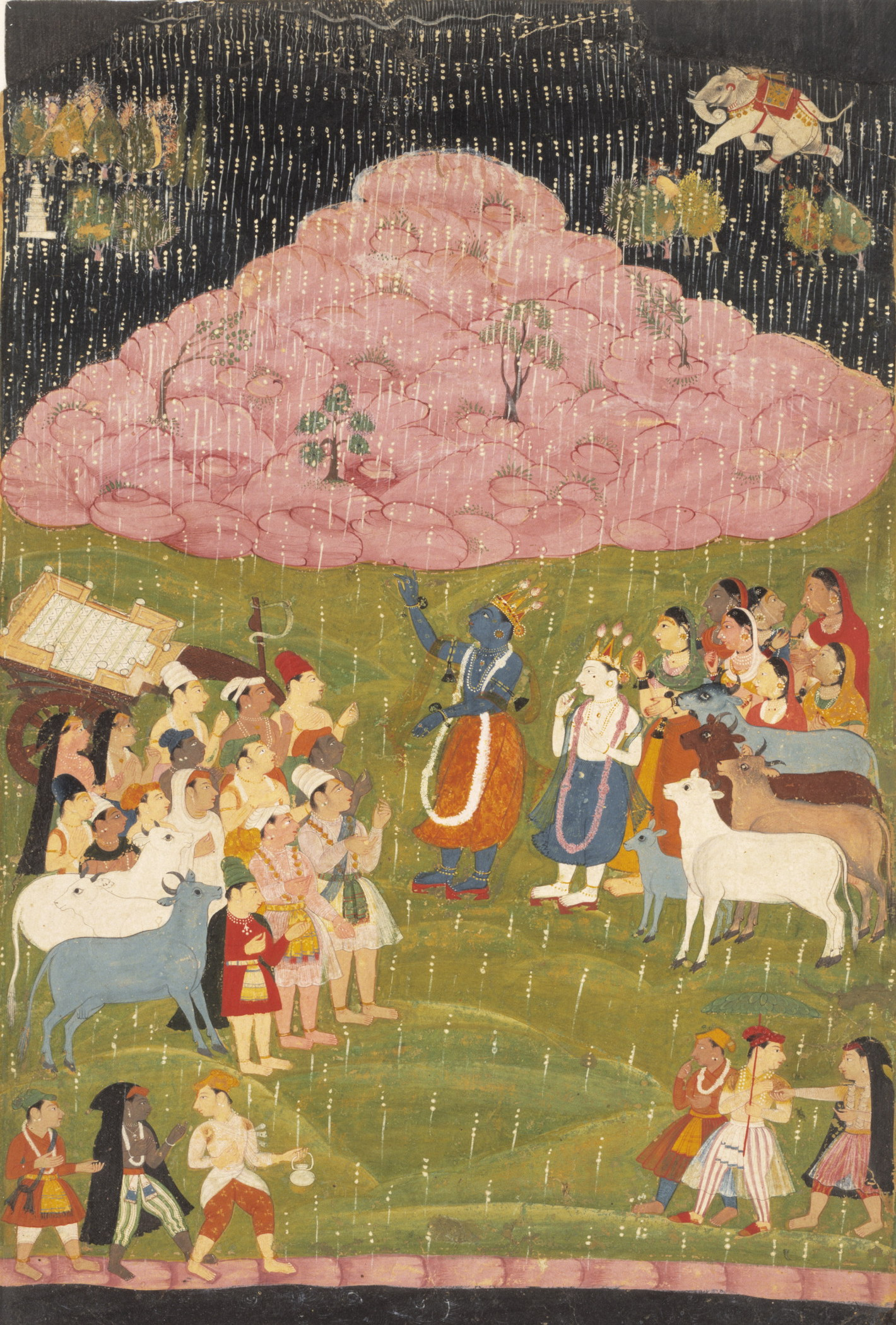
The hovering Govardhan mountain protecting Krishna's tribe from an air attack, as in Avatar

Discussing explicit or implicit similarities between the film and the philosophy of Hinduism, reviewers suggested that, just as Hindu gods, particularly Vishnu, become avatars to save the order of the universe, the film’s avatar must descend to avert impending ultimate doom, effected by a rapacious greed that leads to destroying the world of nature and other civilizations. Maxim Osipov observed that the film's philosophical message was consistent overall with the Bhagavad Gita, a key scripture of Hinduism, in defining what constitutes real culture and civilization.

Critics saw an "undeniably" Hindu connection between the film's story and the Vedic teaching of reverence for the whole universe, as well as the yogic practice of inhabiting a distant body by one’s consciousness and compared the film's love scene to tantric practices. Another linked the Na'vi earth goddess Eywa to the concept of Brahman as the ground of being described in Vedanta and Upanishads and likened the Na'vi ability to connect to Eywa with the realization of Atman. One commentator noted the parallel between the Na'vi greeting "I see you" and the ancient Hindu greeting "Namaste", which signifies perceiving and adoring the divinity within others. Others commented on Avatar's adaptation of the Hindu teaching of reincarnation,—a concept, which another author felt was more accurately applicable to ordinary human beings that are "a step or two away from exotic animals" than to deities.

Writing for the Ukrainian Day newspaper, Maxim Chaikovsky drew detailed analogies between Avatar's plot and elements of the ancient Bhagavata Purana narrative of Krishna, including the heroine Radha, the Vraja tribe and their habitat the Vrindavana forest, the hovering Govardhan mountain, and the mystical rock chintamani. He also opined that this resemblance may account for "Avatar blues"—a sense of loss experienced by members of the audience at the conclusion of the film.

=== Pantheism vs. Christianity ===
Some Christian writers worried that Avatar promotes pantheism and nature worship. A critic for L’Osservatore Romano of the Holy See wrote that the film "shows a spiritualism linked to the worship of nature, a fashionable pantheism in which creator and creation are mixed up." Likewise, Vatican Radio argued that the film "cleverly winks at all those pseudo-doctrines that turn ecology into the religion of the millennium. Nature is no longer a creation to defend, but a divinity to worship." According to Vatican spokesman Federico Lombardi, these reviews reflect the Pope's views on neopaganism, or confusing nature and spirituality. On the other hand, disagreeing with the Vatican's characterization of Avatar as pagan, a writer in the National Catholic Reporter urged Christian critics to see the film in the historical context of "Christianity's complicity in the conquest of the Americas" instead.

Ross Douthat, a conservative columnist of The New York Times, called Avatar "the Gospel According to James" and "Cameron's long apologia for pantheism [which] has been Hollywood's religion of choice for a generation now." Replying to him, Jay Michaelson of the HuffPost wrote "The Meaning of Avatar: Everything is God (A Response to Ross Douthat and other naysayers of ‘pantheism’)". In The Weekly Standard, John Podhoretz criticized the film's "mindless worship of a nature-loving tribe and the tribe's adorable pagan rituals." Christian critic David Outten disputed that "the danger to moviegoers is that Avatar presents the Na'vi culture on Pandora as morally superior to life on Earth. If you love the philosophy and culture of the Na'vi too much, you will be led into evil rather than away from it." Outten further added: "Cameron has done a masterful job in manipulating the emotions of his audience in Avatar. He created a world where it looks good and noble to live in a tree and hunt for your food daily with a bow and arrow. ... Cameron said, 'Avatar asks us to see that everything is connected, all human beings to each other, and us to the Earth.' This is a clear statement of religious belief. This is pantheism. It is not Christianity." The deleted scene "The Dream Hunt", which is included in the DVD extras, shows elements that reminded Erik Davis and others of ayahuasca experiences.

Other Christian critics wrote that Avatar has "an abhorrent New Age, pagan, anti-capitalist worldview that promotes goddess worship and the destruction of the human race" and suggested that Christian viewers interpret the film as a reminder of Jesus Christ as "the True Avatar". Some of them also suspected Avatar of subversive retelling of the biblical Exodus, by which Cameron "invites us to look at the Bible from the side of Canaanites." Conversely, other commentators concluded that the film promotes theism or panentheism rather than pantheism, arguing that the hero "does not pray to a tree, but through a tree to the deity whom he addresses personally" and, unlike in pantheism, "the film's deity does indeed—contrary to the native wisdom of the Na'vi—interfere in human affairs." Ann Marlowe of Forbes agreed, saying that "though Avatar has been charged with "pantheism", its mythos is just as deeply Christian." Another author suggested that the film's message "leads to a renewed reverence for the natural world—a very Christian teaching." Saritha Prabhu, an Indian-born columnist for The Tennessean, saw the film as a misportrayal of pantheism: "What pantheism is, at least, to me: a silent, spiritual awe when looking (as Einstein said) at the 'beauty and sublimity of the universe', and seeing the divine manifested in different aspects of nature. What pantheism isn't: a touchy-feely, kumbaya vibe as is often depicted. No wonder many Americans are turned off." Prabhu also criticized Hollywood and Western media for what she saw as their generally poor job of portraying Eastern spirituality.

== Bibliography ==
- Armstrong, Jeffrey (2010). Spiritual Teachings of the Avatar: Ancient Wisdom for a New World. New York, NY: Simon & Schuster (Atria Books). ISBN 978-1-58270-281-0.
- Mahoney, Kevin Patrick (2010). Carmine, Alex (ed.). The Ultimate Fan's Guide to Avatar, James Cameron's Epic Movie (Unauthorized). London, UK: Punked Books. ISBN 978-0-9533172-5-7.
- Baxter, Stephen (2012). The Science of Avatar. London, UK: Gollancz. ISBN 9780575130951. OCLC 769471257.
- Dunn, George A, ed. (2014). Avatar and Philosophy: Learning to See. Malden, MA: Wiley Blackwell. ISBN 9780470940310. OCLC 881469312.
