= New religious movements in the Pacific Northwest =

New religious movements in the Pacific Northwest region of the United States have a history going back to the 19th century.

== Expression ==
Although the Pacific Northwest is often listed as the least churched part of the United States, some researchers have found the region to be strong in the "secular but spiritual" category. Sociologist Mark Shibley has identified several modes of expression of those who identify as "secular but spiritual" in the Pacific Northwest, including New Age, earth-based and pagan practices, and nature religion. Shibley notes daily practice of nature religion in environmentalism, deep ecology and wilderness preservation, and finds the dominant dimension of Pacific Northwest life to be how the people relate to the landscape. Other academics have found "episodic public life in ethically charged matters" to be a characteristic of Northwestern religious sensibility.

Religious expression in the Pacific Northwest has been called, unlike most of the United States, "never ... a 'Christian culture' ...[but] a diverse marketplace of spiritualties including varieties of New Age, neo-paganism, Gaia worship, channeling, metaphysics, holistic health, earth-based spiritualties, Nordic spiritualties, Wicca, meditation centres, astrologers, and westernized forms of Buddhism and yoga."

=== Movements founded in the Northwest ===
New religious movements founded in the region include:

- Indian Shaker Church, founded 1881
- Edmund Creffield's Bride of Christ Church, founded 1903
- Brother XII's Aquarian Foundation on Vancouver Island, founded 1927
- Community Chapel and Bible Training Center, founded 1967
- Church of Jesus Christ at Armageddon (Love Family), founded 1968
- Shasta Abbey, founded 1970
- Sun Bear founded the Bear Tribe Medicine Society in 1971
- Aquarian Tabernacle Church, founded 1979
- The Rowan Tree Church, founded 1979
- Rajneeshpuram, founded c. 1981
- Ramtha's School of Enlightenment, founded 1988
- Mars Hill Church, founded 1996

=== Nones ===
In the Northwest, people who don't express any religious affiliation, called "nones" by experts like Elizabeth Drescher, constitute a larger percentage of the population than "nones" in any other parts of the United States. Drescher, a professor at Santa Clara University's Department of Religious Studies, calls the entire Pacific Northwest a "none zone". Susanna Morrill, a scholar of religion at Lewis & Clark College in Portland, called some Northwesterners' expression "experiencing the natural world in a way that feels supernatural". If counted as a religious group, the "nones" in the Northwest would outnumber the next largest group, Roman Catholics, by more than two to one.

== See also ==
- List of new religious movements
- New religious movement
- Pacific Northwest#Spirituality and religion
- Sociological classifications of religious movements
