= Thomas Barnett =

Thomas Barnett may refer to:

- Thomas Barnett (musician) (born 1973), American singer and songwriter
- Thomas P. Barnett (1870–1929), American architect and painter
- Thomas P. M. Barnett (born 1962), American military geostrategist
- Thomas Speakman Barnett (1909–2003), Canadian politician
- Thomas Barnett (Niagara Falls) (1799–1890), museum proprietor, collector and innkeeper
- Thomas Barnett (footballer, born 1876) (1876–?), English footballer
- Thomas Barnett (footballer, born 1908), English footballer for Watford
- Thomas Barnett (footballer, born 1936), English footballer for Crystal Palace
- Tom Barnett (American football) (born 1937), former professional American football player
- Tommy Barnett (pastor), American author and pastor
