= James Barnett =

James or Jim Barnett may refer to:

== Politicians ==
- Jim Barnett (Kansas politician) (born 1954), American politician
- Jim Barnett (Mississippi politician) (1926–2013), American physician and politician
- James Barnett (MP) (c. 1760–1836), English politician, MP for Rochester
- James Barnett (New York politician) (1810–1874), New York politician in Madison County, New York
- James R. Barnett (1842–1917), Wisconsin politician

== Others ==
- James Barnett (entrepreneur) (born 1986), American entrepreneur and community activist
- James V. Barnett II, American engineer
- James Rennie Barnett (1864–1965), Scottish naval architect
- Jim Barnett (basketball) (born 1944), American basketball player and commentator
- Jim Barnett (wrestling) (1924–2004), American professional wrestling promoter
- James Barnett (writer), American television writer and the co-creator of the television show F Troop

== See also ==
- James Barnet (1827–1904), Australian architect
