= Barnet M. Levy =

American physician

- Born: January 13, 1917; Scranton, Pennsylvania
- Died: March 7, 2014 (aged 97); Mexico City
- Scientific career
- Fields: Oral pathology
- Institutions: Columbia University; University of Texas Dental Branch at Houston; National Autonomous University of Mexico (UNAM)

Barnet Mortimer Levy (January 13, 1917 – March 7, 2014) was an American oral pathologist and professor at universities in the United States and Mexico. Levy worked to integrate basic science research into dentistry, believing that oral health should not be separated from other aspects of health. He co-authored an influential textbook, co-founded a research institute in Texas, and served in national leadership roles, including the presidency of the International Association for Dental Research and the American Academy of Oral & Maxillofacial Pathology.

== Biography ==
Born in Scranton, Pennsylvania, Levy earned an undergraduate degree and a DDS degree from the University of Pennsylvania. After completing a master's degree in bacteriology and pathology at the Medical College of Virginia (MCV), Levy taught at MCV and at the Washington University School of Dental Medicine before joining the dental faculty at Columbia University in 1949. He moved to Texas in 1957 and joined the faculty of the University of Texas Dental Branch at Houston. He became a co-author of a widely known dental reference, A Textbook of Oral Pathology.

In 1964, Levy co-founded the Dental Science Institute (DSI) at the UT Dental Branch and he served as its first director. The DSI was established to study treatments for periodontal disease and dental caries. A major focus of the institute was on oral health in the aging population. While in Houston, Levy also served with other institutions, particularly within the Texas Medical Center. He was the faculty president of the University of Texas Graduate School of Biomedical Sciences at Houston in 1982–83. He chaired the City of Houston Board of Health and consulted at the University of Texas MD Anderson Cancer Center and the Veterans Affairs Medical Center in Houston. The DSI was dissolved in 1995.

Levy held leadership positions in several national organizations. He was a member of the Committee on Dentistry at the National Academy of Sciences. In 1965–66, he was the president of the International Association for Dental Research. He was the president of the American Academy of Oral & Maxillofacial Pathology in 1969. He was named editor of the Journal of Dental Research (JDR) in 1976. He had previously served as an associate editor for the Journal of Oral Pathology.

Late in his career, Levy was on the faculty of the National Autonomous University of Mexico (UNAM), first as a visiting professor and then as the Dr. Ignacio Chavez Distinguished Professor. The Biblioteca Dr. Barnet M. Levy is the postgraduate library at UNAM's dental school. The school hosts an international conference on periodontal biology that is named after him. Levy took sabbatical leave to work at the Salk Institute and also held an adjunct faculty appointment at Texas A&M University.

In retirement, Levy lived in Englewood, New Jersey. In 2014, he died in a Mexico City assisted living facility. He was buried in Englewood, next to his wife Henrietta.
