= Barnett Township =

Barnett Township is the name of a few townships in the United States:

- Barnett Township, Arkansas in Van Buren County, Arkansas
- Barnett Township, DeWitt County, Illinois
- Barnett Township, Roseau County, Minnesota
- Barnett Township, Forest County, Pennsylvania
- Barnett Township, Jefferson County, Pennsylvania
