= Richard Barnett =

Richard Barnett may refer to:

- Sir Richard Barnett (politician) (1863–1930), Irish sport shooter and MP
- Richard David Barnett (1909–1986), Keeper, Department of Western Asiatic Antiquities of the British Museum
- Dick Barnett (Richard Barnett, 1936–2025), American basketball player
- Sir Richard Barnett (economist) (born 1952), Vice-Chancellor of Ulster University, 2006–2015
- Richie Barnett (born 1972), New Zealand rugby league footballer
- Richard Barnett (historian) (born 1980), British medical historian
- Richie Barnett (rugby league, born 1981), English rugby league footballer
- Richard Barnett (Capitol rioter), participant in the 2021 United States Capitol attack

== See also ==
- Richard Barnet (1929–2004), American scholar-activist
