= Donald Lee Barnett =

American pastor (1930–2017)

- Born: May 29, 1930; Clarkston, Washington, U.S.
- Died: December 31, 2017 (aged 87); King County, Washington, U.S.
- Occupation: Pastor

Donald Lee Barnett (May 29, 1930 – December 31, 2017) was an American pastor who founded Community Chapel and Bible Training Center, a controversial church near Burien, Washington, and was its only pastor during its 21-year history, from 1967 to 1988. In 1988 he formed the Church of Agape located at 126 Logan Avenue South in Renton, Washington.

== Background ==
Don Barnett was born in Clarkston, Washington on May 29, 1930, but moved with his family to Tacoma, Washington, as a young boy. His father was an accountant and part-time Pentecostal minister. His mother was a teacher.

After high school, Barnett attended a Bible college in Boise, Idaho, where he met his future wife, Barbara, and was greatly influenced by the Latter Rain Movement within Pentecostalism, which was at its peak at that time. When he married and was faced with the increasing expenses of family life, he left Bible college, without graduating or being ordained, to take a job at a sawmill in Tacoma, moving his young family there with him. Later they moved to Seattle when he took a job at Boeing as a draftsman.

In Seattle, he taught Bible classes at home, at work, and at three Pentecostal churches. According to Tim Brown, director of the Colossian Fellowship (an evangelical Christian group concerned with biblical orthodoxy), Barnett was dismissed from these three churches for not teaching the trinity.

In the mid-1960s he began meeting with a group of families south of Seattle that became the nucleus of Community Chapel, which was formally established in 1967. It grew rapidly and by the early 1980s had over 3000 members at the main site near Burien, as well as several hundred more among 22 satellite churches across the nation.

=== Indecent exposure charge ===
In 1975, Barnett pleaded guilty to exposing himself to maids in a hallway of the Circus Circus Las Vegas. According to police reports in Clark County, Nevada, dated November 23, 1975, Barnett masturbated in front of four maids in the hallway of the Circus Circus Hotel. The initial charge of indecent exposure, a misdemeanor, was plea bargained down to "open and gross lewdness," a charge Barnett pleaded guilty to, paying a fine of $100. The case was closed on April 30, 1976. The charge was revealed during a 1988 lawsuit when his claim that he had never pled guilty or been convicted of a crime under oath was investigated.

=== "Spiritual connections" controversy ===
In 1985, Barnett began to advocate the practice of "spiritual connections" to the members of his church. The practice involved seeking intense emotional and spiritual experiences, of love (agape), individually or with another person, often not one's spouse, while dancing together in worship. Following the introduction of this practice, turmoil increased in Barnett's church and many members began leaving. These troubles reached their culmination in 1988 with several lawsuits brought against Barnett and others in the church's leadership alleging sexual improprieties related to the practice of "connections," including church policy condoning French kissing of children. (Not true) At that time, Barnett was ousted from his church by its remaining elders, leading to further protracted legal proceedings.

=== Church of Agape ===
After being expelled from Community Chapel by the elders, Barnett left with two to three hundred of its members to establish a new church in Renton, Washington, named the Church of Agape, where he recently retired and has moved into a nursing home as he suffers dementia"

== Newspaper articles ==
- "The Pastor who sets them dancing" Seattle Post-Intelligencer, April 10, 1986.
- "Barnett Troubles Obscure Success – Friends and Critics Blame his Woes on Ego, Eccentricities" Seattle Times, March 18, 1988.
- "Chapel service reveals strengths, weaknesses of troubled church" Valley Daily News, May 8, 1988.
- "'Embarrassment' Burien-Church Officials React to Pastor's Ouster" The Seattle Times, March 3, 1988.
