= Herbert L. Barnet =

American business executive

Herbert L. Barnet (1909–1970) was an American business executive who served as the chairman of the board of the Pepsi-Cola Company and as a director of its parent company, Pepsico.

== Biography ==
Barnet was born in Brooklyn into a Jewish family. He graduated from Syracuse University and later received a law degree from New York University. He joined the Pepsi-Cola Company in January 1949 as a vice president. He was promoted to executive vice president in mid-1950 and became president of the company in 1955. In 1963, he was named chairman of the board, a position he held until his retirement.

In July 1962, while serving as president, Barnet announced the appointment of Harvey C. Russell as a vice president. The event was historically significant as Russell was a Black executive, and the appointment was reported to be the first of its kind at a major international corporation. The decision received widespread coverage in over 100 newspapers and drew letters of commendation from members of the U.S. presidential cabinet. He placed actress Joan Crawford on the board of directors.

In addition to his role at Pepsi, Barnet served on the board of directors for the Columbia Pictures Corporation and the Marine Midland Bank–New York. He was also active in civic organizations, serving as the president of the Greater New York Council of the Boy Scouts of America, the national chairman of the March of Dimes, and a trustee of Tougaloo College in Mississippi.
