= Community Chapel and Bible Training Center =

Independent church in Burien, Washington, US

- Formation: 1967
- Dissolved: 1988
- Type: Independent Pentecostal Christian
- Location: Burien, Washington
- Official language: English
- Pastor: Donald Lee Barnett

Community Chapel and Bible Training Center was a controversial independent church created in 1967 and pastored by Donald Lee Barnett in which he taught his version of Oneness Pentecostalism, later turning into a Unitarian. The church eventually grew to an attendance of over 3,000 before splitting and losing significant numbers in 1988 because of numerous lawsuits brought against Barnett and others in the church leadership for sexual improprieties. Community Chapel became infamous for a practice its leaders advocated known as "spiritual connections." This practice involved seeking intense emotional experiences of love with another person, usually not one's spouse, while dancing together in worship. It was taught at the Chapel that through this experience, Jesus, specially known to the participants as "the glorified Son of Man" because of the teaching of Barnett, was connecting the members of his church together in love as he had always meant them to be.

== History ==
=== Early history ===
The original grounds, or "east campus," of Community Chapel and Bible Training Center.

Community Chapel originated in a home Bible study led by Barnett. According to her book The Truth Shall Set You Free, Barnett’s wife Barbara worked as a representative of Burien Welcome Wagon, a committee for welcoming new members to the community, in the 1960s. In the course of this work, she met Keith and Joanne Gunn, recent arrivals from Chippewa Falls, Wisconsin, and, though they were Lutheran, Mrs. Barnett invited them to a Pentecostal meeting at the church she and her husband attended. Keith Gunn became interested in the Pentecostal experience of being "filled with the Holy Spirit," and invited Mr. Barnett, who had two years of education at a Pentecostal Bible college in Boise, Idaho, to start a Bible study in the Gunn's home for others similarly interested. This Bible study grew and was soon incorporated as the church of Community Chapel.

In 1969, some members of this group sold many of their possessions, and some put second mortgages on their homes, to finance construction of a Bible school on 5 acres (20,000 m^{2}) of rural land which Barbara had found in Burien, Washington. As membership grew the group purchased 36 acres (150,000 m^{2}) more of nearby land. The Chapel then constructed elementary and secondary schools on its newly acquired land, erected a large sanctuary, a printing press, a recording studio, employed a security force to monitor the property, and began holding church services.

Early services at the chapel were fairly typical of Pentecostal services, including "speaking in tongues," spontaneous prophecies and "words of knowledge" from God. The meetings were also characterized by persons spontaneously leading out in singing the usually simple chorus-like melodies of praise, a style of ministering music typical of a very few churches that were involved in a Pentecostal movement of the late 40s and early 50s (most of the rest having died out since), which would often erupt in massive expressions of praise and worship, usually overwhelming the feelings and emotions of those present in ways to which most adherents of traditional Christianity were not accustomed. The group continued to grow, soon listing roughly 150 outreach ministries in its publications, including hospital and prison ministries.

On September 14, 1979 the Church Articles of Incorporation were rewritten so that only a four-member board headed by Barnett could make decisions. According to Tim Brown, director of the Colossian Fellowship (an evangelical Christian group concerned with biblical orthodoxy), it was at this point the group "took an authoritarian turn." As the group's rules began to change, Barnett instituted "Operation Rescue," in which members were encouraged to report on each other's faults to the pastor. A dress code was implemented, as well as a dietary code restricting pork and shellfish, all based on Barnett's interpretation of Old Testament Judaic Laws. Specific Christian books and bookstores were also to be avoided, because they contained "false creeds." The celebration of Christmas and Easter was also discouraged because Barnett considered them "secular" holidays. Engagements were also forbidden, unless Barnett's wife Barbara was informed beforehand. Indications of a negative or "rebellious" attitude were frequently attributed to demon possession.

The "new sanctuary," or "west campus," of Community Chapel, built in 1979.

Throughout the 1970s, according to researcher Ronald Enroth, a series of "spiritual fads" began to sweep through the church, "exciting many of the faithful but confusing many others." The first of these was the "white room experience," introduced by Barbara Barnett as a result of a vision she claimed to have received. The "white room" was a mystical place that enabled one to become especially intimate with the Lord, but could only be reached through a progression of varying degrees of spiritual maturity. Another "fad" was known as the "pillar of holiness," a spiritual event that could only be experienced by those who had "gotten into the white room." Another "fad" was referred to as "singing in the Spirit," in which the entire congregation would sing in tongues together. A "fad" known as "spiritual surgery" also occurred, in which individuals were encouraged to "completely yield to God," so that "inner healing" could result.

In 1979, Barnett invited area ministers to a series of meetings known as the "Puget Sound Charismatic Ministers Discussion on the Doctrine of the Bible." According to Dr. Daniel Pecota, a professor at Northwest College (now Northwest University) in Kirkland, WA, Barnett monopolized the meetings with preaching about the "Oneness" doctrine, a doctrine that, because it denies the Trinity, is widely recognized as contrary to historical Christian doctrine. Religious leaders, including Pecota, soon stopped attending the meetings.

=== The dancing revelation ===
In 1983, Don Barnett told his congregation that he was taken "in Spirit" to heaven, where he sang with angels and experienced "oneness of being" with Christ. Following this, he instituted "dancing before the Lord," which was a free-form, individual dance with spiritual implications. In 1985, however, this evolved into a highly controversial, intimate two-person dancing practice known as "spiritual connections."

During church services, members were instructed to find a dance partner, known as a "connection." By staring into each other's eyes, a process known as connecting, partners were told they would in actuality be seeing Jesus in each other's eyes, and were encouraged to look with love into their spiritual connection's eyes in order to express their love to Jesus. Throughout the week, both in and out of church, members were encouraged to spend time with their spiritual connections in a kind of "quasi-dating relationship." Physical intimacy often accompanied these "spiritual" connections, and connection love was taught to be more intense, and more desirable, than marital love. A former member has stated that the connecting experience was so intense that she and other women would experience orgasms without ever having any physical contact with their connections.

It was taught that God was using the "spiritual connections" to break down the barriers and inhibitions within the congregation, and promote greater "unity" within the church. Spouses that felt jealousy watching were taught to "release their mates unto the Lord," and Pastor Barnett taught from the pulpit that members were not to view the connections "carnally." According to Barnett, what the people were doing (which included hugging, holding, fondling, kissing) was not to be viewed with the eyes of the "flesh." As he explained, "What's happening is they're having spiritual union ... It just looks the same on the outside, but what's really occurring is spiritual, so don't judge them or their motives." In the book Churches That Abuse, a former member described what it was like at church services that included such sessions of dancing:

Picture your typical forty-year-old wife who's out of shape and has six children. There she is watching her husband dancing with this little twenty, year-old perfect beauty-long blonde hair, big bust, little waist-in his arms, gazing at her for hours. And meanwhile the wife is going insane.

The practice often led to marital friction. The members were told that intimate spiritual experiences with their "spiritual connection" (typically a member of the opposite sex to whom one was not married) could help defeat the "demons of jealousy" and open up the person to a deepened experience of the love of Christ. Critics have attributed spiritual connections to "over 400 court cases of divorce, plus separations as well as suicides and the murder of a young girl by her mother." The practice of spiritual dancing has been highly criticized in newspapers and books, and by former members and researchers. The Rev. David Wilkerson, author of "The Cross and the Switchblade," referred to the practices as "the most grievous thing I've ever heard in my 30 years of ministry" and "the worst error that's ever come into the charismatic movement."

According to the book French Kissing in an American Cult: Revised & Reviled, the main church established a counseling center during its final years to deal with spouses driven to the brink of suicide. The book, written by the church’s longtime director of communications, claims that counselors at the center recommended secret abortions to hide pregnancies resulting from spiritual connections. It also claims that Pastor Barnett held a series of evening classes during this time to attempt to disprove the common evangelical opposition to abortion, after himself instructing at least one of his connections to have an abortion.

=== CRI labels group a "cult" ===
In 1986, the Christian Research Institute issued a statement about the group, in which they stated that, "Based on our research, there is more than sufficient evidence to show that CCBTC is, in the theological sense of the term, a cult. That is, a religious organization which professes to be Christian but which teaches heretical doctrine on the fundamentals of the Christian faith." According to the CRI, the group's beliefs about Christian demon possession and "Oneness" constituted heresy. The practice of "spiritual connections" was also criticized as "unbiblical and socially deviant." In conclusion, the CRI wrote, "Christians should not seek to have fellowship with those involved."

== Legal Proceedings involving community chapel ==
=== Civil complaints filed for alleged sexual misconduct ===
On April 30, 1986, Carol Gabrielson filed a Complaint for Damages against Donald Barnett, Pastor Jack Mcdonald, the Tacoma satellite branch of Community Chapel and Bible Training Center led by Mcdonald and the main Burien campus of Community Chapel. The complaint alleged various claims arising out of the alleged sexual misconduct of Pastor Jack McDonald and the "spiritual connections" doctrine taught by the Community Chapel. Gabrielson provided details of the misconduct in a deposition given October 22, 1987. On October 24, 1988 she was awarded $130,000 by a Pierce County Jury. The award to Gabrielson was originally $200,000, but was reduced by 35 percent due to her contributory negligence in the situation.

Numerous other individuals filed civil lawsuits in King County Superior Court against Barnett and Community Chapel in 1986 including Kathy Butler, Sandi Brown, Michael & Sandy Ehrlich, and many others. Their claims included assault and battery, outrage, "ministerial malpractice", negligent counseling, "wrongful disfellowship", counselor malpractice, infliction of emotion distress, loss of consortium, loss of parental consortium and defamation, among others. Many of these lawsuits were eventually consolidated for trial purposes under King County Superior Court Cause No. 86-2-18176-8, although all of the cases settled before trial. The court files pertaining these cases can be found here:

=== Elders request judicial dissolution of Community Chapel ===
By 1988, most of Community Chapel's congregation had left the church, many church elders had left, and strong divisions were evident between the remaining elders and Pastor Barnett. In March, 1988, elders of Community Chapel sought to dissolve the church due to the ongoing conflicts between them and Pastor Barnett. A petition for dissolution was filed by the elders on March 21, 1988 under King County Superior Court Cause No. 88-2-05272-7. Barnett opposed the petition and took numerous depositions of Community Chapel Elders and staff, including the deposition of Mark Yokers, Drake Pesce, John H. Dubois, Scott Hartley, Loren Krenelka, David Motherwell and Wyman Smalley. Barnett also requested the elders be held in contempt of court, as the mere filing of a separate petition to dissolve the corporation before another judge was a per se violation of the restraining orders then in effect in the declaratory judgment action. On June 6, 1988, Judge Wartnick found elders in contempt of court for violating the earlier restraining orders. The dissolution proceedings were later dismissed by Judge Charles Burdell.

After being expelled from Community Chapel by the elders, in 1988, Barnett established a new church in Renton, Washington, named the Church of Agape, where he was still preaching and practicing "spiritual connections" in 1996

=== Criminal Proceedings ===
==== Death of child linked to group ====
On March 20, 1986, a parishioner of Community Chapel and wife of a teacher in the high school drove to a motel in Portland, Oregon and drowned her 5-year-old daughter in a bathtub, allegedly to save her from demons. A short time later the parishioner entered a plea of "not guilty for reasons of insanity" to the crime. On April 16, 1986 Judge R. William Riggs found that the member was affected by mental disease or defect at the time of engaging in the criminal conduct, and ordered the member be committed to Sheppard and Enoch Pratt Psychiatric Hospital in Towson, Maryland. On July 26, 1991, the parishioner was discharged from the hospital when it was believed they no longer continued to present a substantial danger to others.

Also, there were some 60 separate cases, of failure to report child molestation.
