= Barnett, Georgia =

Barnett
- Unincorporated community
- Location within the state of Georgia Barnett (the United States)
- Coordinates: 33°30′14″N 82°48′28″W
- Country: United States
- State: Georgia
- County: Warren
- Time zone: UTC-5 (Eastern (EST))
  - Summer (DST): UTC-4 (EDT)
- Area code: 706
- GNIS ID: 354464

Barnett is an unincorporated community in Warren County, in the U.S. state of Georgia.

== History ==
A post office called Barnett was established in 1878, and remained in operation until 1974. In 1900, the community had 381 inhabitants.
