= Jordan Barnett =

Jordan Barnett is the name of:

- Jordan Barnett (basketball) (born 1995), American basketball player
- Jordan Barnett (footballer) (born 1999), English footballer
