= Barnet Run =

Stream in West Virginia, U.S.

Coordinates: 38°28′09″N 80°38′29″W

Barnet Run is a stream in the U.S. state of West Virginia.

Barnet Run most likely was named after William Barnett, a local pioneer.

== See also ==
- List of rivers of West Virginia
