= Thomas Barnett (footballer, born 1876) =

English footballer

Personal information
- Full name: William Thomas Barnett
- Date of birth: 29 December 1876
- Place of birth: Sherwood, England
- Position: Centre forward

Senior career*
Years	Team	Apps	(Gls)
1899–1900	Beeston Rangers		
1900–1902	Nottingham Forest	2	(0)
1902	Newark Town		
Total		2	(0)
- * Club domestic league appearances and goals

William Thomas Barnett (29 December 1876–unknown) was an English footballer who played in the Football League for Nottingham Forest.
