= Vern Barnet =

Unitarian Universalist pastor

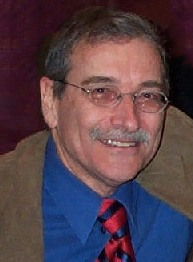
- Born: May 25, 1942 (age 83); Omaha, Nebraska, U.S.
- Occupations: Interfaith minister, writer, teacher
- Title: Reverend
- Children: Benjamin
- Website: cres.org

Vern Barnet (born May 25, 1942 in Omaha, Nebraska) is a Unitarian Universalist pastor and was the weekly newspaper columnist on religious topics in The Kansas City Star 1994-2012. He is the founder of the Kansas City (area) Interfaith Council.

== Biography ==
As part of his doctoral preparation at the University of Chicago, Barnet studied with Mircea Eliade, Eugene Gendlin, and Elisabeth Kübler-Ross. Trained as a Unitarian Universalist pastor, Barnet left parish ministry in 1985 after serving churches in Illinois, Pennsylvania, and Kansas, in order to promote interfaith work in the Kansas City region through an organization he founded in 1982, the World Faiths Center for Religious Experience and Study, Inc. ("CRES"). After developing relationships with members of many faiths in the area informally and through public events, in 1989 he founded the Kansas City (area) Interfaith Council with members of American Indian, Baha'i, Buddhist, Christian Protestant, Christian Roman Catholic, Hindu, Jewish, Muslim, Sikh, Sufi, Unitarian Universalist, Wiccan, and Zoroastrian members. CRES continued to host the Council until 2005 when it became independent.

In 1994 The Kansas City Star asked him to write a regular Wednesday column on interfaith issues, which concluded in 2012. He has also taught comparative religions and related courses in American Baptist, United Methodist, and Unity seminaries and universities as an adjunct professor. He has been honored by Buddhist, Christian, Jewish, Hindu, Muslim, Sikh and other groups in Kansas City and elsewhere and has been involved in numerous civic organizations and activities and is also known through numerous radio and TV appearances.

In 2001, he presided over the area's first major interfaith conference, "The Gifts of Pluralism," and led a Jackson County, Missouri task force which surveyed the five-county metro area in response to religious prejudice following the 9/11 terrorist attacks and issued a 77-page report with recommendations.

In 2007 he was the local coordinator for, and a member of the faculty of, the nation's first "Interfaith Academies" for religious professionals and emerging religious leaders, with partnerships with Harvard University's Pluralism Project and Religions for Peace - USA at the United Nations Plaza, held in Kansas City.

At those Academies, Ellie Pierce, principal researcher for The Pluralism Project, said, "At the Pluralism Project, we consider Kansas City to be truly at the forefront of interfaith relations This is -- in no small part -- due to the tireless efforts of Vern Barnet, whose work and writings have been an inspiration to all of us at the Pluralism Project. In a recent column, he wrote, 'Community is created not so much by intellectual debate but by people getting to know one another.'"

While retaining his professional status as a retired Unitarian Universalist minister, in 2011 he was baptized at Grace and Holy Trinity Cathedral in Kansas City and is a member of St Paul's Episcopal Church in Kansas City. His activities as a layman include serving on a diocesan commission.

== Bibliography ==
In addition to nearly 1000 Kansas City Star columns, his articles, poems, and reviews have appeared in publications such as The National Catholic Reporter, The Journal of the Liberal Ministry, and The Chicago Literary Review. He edited Worship Reader: An Anthology of Liberal Religious Worship Theory from Von Ogden Vogt (1921) to the Commission on Common Worship (1980) (Congregation of Abraxas, 1980). He was one of four editors of the 740-page reference book, The Essential Guide to Religious Traditions and Spirituality for Health Care Providers (Radcliffe Publishing, 2013). He served six years on the editorial board of Unity Magazine. His book of sonnets, Love Without Desire (Moose Magic Press), appeared in 1992. A second collection of sonnets in 2015, Thanks for Noticing: The Interpretation of Desire (La Vita Nuova Books), draws on themes from world religions and is heavily annotated. From 2005 through 2008, he wrote a monthly column for Camp, a Kansas City gay newspaper.

- He is noted or quoted in other publications including the following:
- Tapp, Robert B. Religion Among the Unitarian Universalists. Seminar Press, 1973.
- Mehdi, Mohammad T. Islam and Tolerance. New World Press, 1990.
- James, Sandy. Connect with Kansas City: Ways to Engage in the Community, Sandy Coldsnow, 2001.
- Vahle, Neal. The Unity Movement. Templeton Foundation Press, 2002.
- Skinner, Donald E. "Kansas City UU minister builds interfaith bridges," UU World March/April 2003, on line at
- Foerster, L. Annie. For Praying Out Loud: Interfaith Prayers for Public Occasions. Skinner House Books, 2003.
- Smale, David. "Common Ground in Lieu of Consensus: The Exploration of Stem Cell Research," Ingram's, May 2005, pp 26–30.
- Diuguid, Lewis W. Discovering the Real America: Toward a More Perfect Union. BrownWalker Press, 2007.
- Arnason, Wayne, and Kathleen Rolenz. Worship That Works. Skinner House Books, 2008.
- Heckman, Bud, ed. Interactive Faith: The Essential Interreligious Community-Building Handbook. Skylight Paths Publishing, 2008.
- Vahle, Neal. A Course in Miracles: The Lives of Helen Schucman & William Thetford, 2nd edition. Open View Press, 2009.
- Brooks, Alvin L. Binding Us Together: A Civil Rights Activist Reflects on a Lifetime of Community and Public Service. Andrews McMeel, 2021.
- Paszkiewicz, Joshua R. Zen and Happiness: Practical Insights and Meditations to Cultivate Joy in Everyday Life. Rockridge Press, 2022.
