= Barnette Miller =

American writer

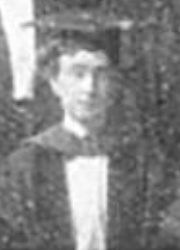
- Barnette Miller, from a 1913 publication
- Born: Alvenia Barnette Miller; December 1, 1875; Charlotte, North Carolina, U.S.
- Died: April 23, 1956 (age 80); South Natick, Massachusetts, U.S.
- Occupations: Writer, college professor

Alvenia Barnette Miller (December 1, 1875 – April 23, 1956) was an American writer and educator. She taught history at Wellesley College, and wrote mostly about Turkey, including a book, Beyond the Sublime Porte (1931). She left over $100,000 to Wellesley College in her will.

== Early life and education ==
Miller was born in Charlotte, North Carolina and raised in Columbia, South Carolina, the daughter of James Meek Miller and Jane Baxter Davidson Miller. She had a brother, Brevard Davidson Miller. She graduated from the North Carolina College for Women in 1895. She earned a master's degree from Columbia University in 1903, and completed doctoral studies in history in 1909, also at Columbia. She pursued further studies at the University of Paris and at Hartford Theological Seminary. She was a member of Phi Beta Kappa.

== Career ==
Miller was a "hearer" in English and French at Bryn Mawr College from 1900 to 1901. She taught at Mount Holyoke College from 1903 to 1904, at Vassar College from 1908 to 1909, and at Smith College from 1915 to 1916. She taught English and history at the Constantinople College for Women from 1909 to 1913, and from 1916 to 1919. She joined the history faculty of Wellesley College in 1920, became a full professor in 1935, and retired with emeritus status in 1943.

Miller was described as "the first foreigner whom the Ottoman government permitted to enter the harem of Seraglio Palace". She was a fellow of the Royal Geographical Society, and a member of the Foreign Policy Association's committee on the Lausanne Treaty.

== Publications ==
Miller's Beyond the Sublime Porte (1931) was reviewed in The New York Times as "an important and scholarly book.

- "Thomas Lovell Beddoes" (1903)
- Leigh Hunt's relations with Byron, Shelley, and Keats (1910)
- "The Passing of the Turkish Harem" (1920)
- "The New Turkey" (1923)
- Beyond the Sublime Porte: The Grand Seraglio of Stambul (1931, with introduction by Halidé Ebib)
- The Palace School of Muhammad the Conqueror (1941)

== Personal life and legacy ==
Miller died in 1956, at the age of 80, at a nursing home in South Natick, Massachusetts. She left Wellesley College over $100,000 in her will, establishing the Barnette Miller Foundation. to support scholarships, professorships, and conferences on international relations at Wellesley College.
