= Shadazzle =

- Genre: Comedy drama
- Created by: Brett Barnett; Stacey Mackenzie
- Written by: Brett Barnett; Stacey Mackenzie; Leigh-Anne Homer
- Directed by: Brett Barnett
- Starring: Brett Barnett; Helen Hall; Georgina Hall; Hugh Hedley; Leigh-Anne Homer; Jonathan Homer; Vicky Flynn; Tom James; Stacey Mackenzie; Ellis Marsh; Jordan Reeves; Catherine Wood
- Opening theme: "Shadazzle Theme"
- Composer: Ostrich Bay
- Country of origin: United Kingdom
- Original language: English
- No. of seasons: 5
- No. of episodes: 40

Production
- Running time: 6–19 minutes

Original release
- Release: 25 January 2012 – 2 December 2015

Shadazzle is a British comedy-drama web series following a group of friends, inspired by soap operas. The show was created by Brett Barnett and Stacey Mackenzie and premiered on 25 January 2012. The series is filmed primarily in Wombwell and Sheffield, with exteriors shot in Wath-upon-Dearne.

== Synopsis ==
A parody of over-the-top soap operas, Shadazzle follows the melodrama in the lives of a group of friends, centred on Florence Smith (played by Helen Hall) and her fiancé, Fred Flagglebush (Brett Barnett). When Fred decides to hire a "vodka swilling cleaner," the couple's personal expenses become tighter and Florence is forced to accept a job as an exotic dancer at a local club. She soon becomes the center of an unstable Trevor Shaw's (Jonathan Homer) unwanted affection, that ends in disaster when Trevor crashes the wedding.

Later seasons explore romance, loneliness, and ultimately the murder of Alex Abernathy (Leigh-Anne Homer) and the clash between Florence and her murderer, Billy (Ellis Marsh), all told from the perspectives of Florence and those closest to her.

Each episode of Shadazzle follows the perspective of a different character, with story lines eventually interlinking as the series progresses, and features themes of personal struggle and alcoholism, among others.

== See also ==
- List of Web television series
