= Euphemia Cowan Barnett =

Scottish botanist and explorer (1890–1970)

Euphemia Cowan Barnett FLS
- Born: 1890
- Died: 12 March 1970 (aged 79–80); Aberdeen, Scotland
- Education: High School for Girls, Aberdeen; University of Aberdeen
- Known for: botany of Thailand genus Barnettia (Bignoniaceae) named for her
- Scientific career
- Workplaces: University of Aberdeen; West of Scotland College of Agriculture; Robert Gordon's Technical College; College of Education, Aberdeen
- Thesis: A survey of the genus Quercus and related Genera of the Fagaceae in Asia with a more detailed account of the Siamese species of these Genera and Notes on the use of Leaf Anatomy in Taxonomy

Euphemia Cowan Barnett FLS (1890–1970) was a Scottish botanist known for her research of the flora of Thailand, particularly Fagaceae. The standard author abbreviation Barnett is used to indicate this person as the author when citing a botanical name.

== Biography ==
Barnett was educated at the High School for Girls in Aberdeen, she then went on to study botany at the University of Aberdeen graduating with a BSc in 1918.

After graduation she worked as an assistant to Professors J. W. H. Trail and W. G. Craib at the university and studied the botanical specimens that Crab and Dr A.F.G. Bell had collected in Thailand. When she returned to Aberdeen later in her career she continued her research into this collection an earned a DSc for her work in 1940. She was elected a fellow of the Linnean Society of London.

Barnett was a lecturer in mycology and plant pathology at the West of Scotland College of Agriculture, then lecturer in biology at Robert Gordon's Technical College, and finally Head of Biology Department at Aberdeen College of Education where she remained until her retirement in 1955.

After she retired she received a research fellowship from the University of Aberdeen, and continued her research of Thai flora at both the university's herbarium and the Royal Botanic Garden, Kew, London.

She identified and named many Thai plants. The genus Barnettia (Bignoniaceae) was named by Dr Santisuk in her honour.

Outside academia she was associated with the Girl Guides since they had been established in the city.

She died at her home in Aberdeen on 12 March 1970.

== Works ==
- Barnett, Euphemia Cowan (1940). A Survey of the Genus Quercus and Related Genera of the Fagaceae in Asia, with a More Detailed Account of the Siamese Species of These Genera and Notes on the Use of Leaf Anatomy in Taxonomy.
