= Herle =

Herle may refer to:

- Heerlen, a city in the Netherlands
- Herle (surname), a list of people with the name

== See also ==
- Herl, a municipality in Germany
- Harle (disambiguation)
