= Harle =

Harle may refer to:

== Places ==
- Harle (river), a river in North Germany
- Harle (gat), a gat between the East Frisian Islands of Spiekeroog and Wangeroog
- Harle (Chrono Cross), a video game character

== People with the surname ==
- Harle Freeman-Greene (born 1934), diplomat of New Zealand
- Danny L Harle, British music producer and composer
- David Harle (born 1963), English footballer
- Graham Harle (born 1931), Canadian politician
- John Harle (born 1956), saxophonist and composer
- Laurence Harlé (born 2005), French screenwriter
- Mark Harle, singer and drummer
- Mike Harle (born 1972), English footballer
- Sid Harle, American judge and politician
- Tamás Harle (born 1960), Hungarian journalist and author
- Teal Harle (born 1996), Canadian skier
- Vilho Harle (born 1947), Finnish academic

== Other uses ==
- Harle Airfield, Friesland, Lower Saxony, Germany

== See also ==
- Harle Syke, a village in England
- Harl
- Herle (disambiguation)
