= László Lénárd =

Hungarian neuroscientist

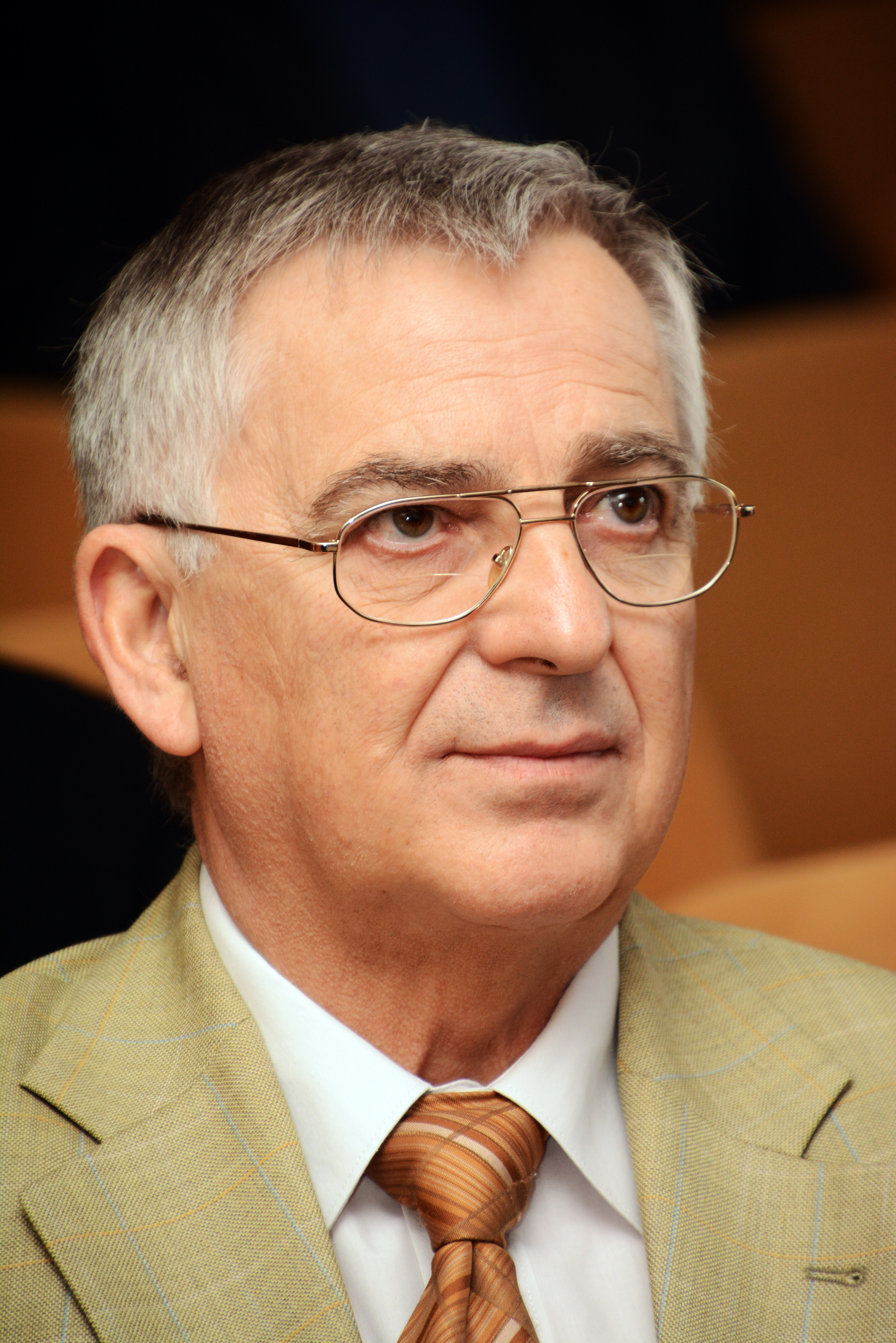
- László Lénárd, 2017.
- Born: October 26, 1944 (age 81); Pécs
- Education: University of Pécs
- Occupation: physician
- Medical career
- Field: neuroscientists
- Institutions: University of Pécs
- Awards: Pro Scientia (1989, 1993) IBNS Fellow Award: (1995); János Szentágothai Board of Trustees Prize (2000); Grastyán Prize (2001, 2008); Markusovszky memorial plaque (2004); Myers Lifetime Achievement Award for Outstending Scientific Contributions to the Field of Behavioral Neuroscience from the International Behavioral Neuroscience Society (2005) Széchenyi Prize (2011)
- Website: Data sheet on the website of the Hungarian Academy of Sciences Publication list in the Hungarian Archives of Scientific Works Web of Science. Lenard Laszlo (Author)

László Lénárd (born October 26, 1944) is a Hungarian neuroscientist, member of the Hungarian Academy of Sciences, and professor.

== Biography ==
Born in Pécs, in 1963 he started his studies at the University of Medicine in Pécs, where he received his medical degree in 1969. Afterwards, he was a trainee at the Department of Neurology and Mental Medicine of the University of Pécs, and from 1970 he became a staff member of the Institute of Physiology. He also worked at the Research Group on Neurobiology of the Hungarian Academy of Sciences. In 1989, he was appointed as a scientific advisor. In 1990, he started teaching at the Department of Animal Physiology at the University, with a professorship, and was appointed Director of the Institute of Physiology at the University. Between 1997 and 2000, he was a Széchenyi Professorial Fellow. In 1997, he was elected Vice-Rector of the University, and in 2000, after the merger with the Janus Pannonius University, he became Dean of the Faculty of General Medicine of the University of Pécs. He was elected as Rector (President) of the University of Pécs in 2003 and held this position until 2007. Since 2014 he is professor emeritus. He held this position until 2007. In 2009, he handed over his position as Director of the Institute to his successor. He defended his Candidate of Medical Sciences in 1980 and his academic doctorate in 1989. He became a member of the Scientific Committee on Neurobiology, the Interdepartmental Standing Committee on Environment and Health and the Academic Committee of Pécs. He has been the president of the Regional Committee of the Hungarian Academy of Sciences, since 2018. The latter has been the chairman since 2018. He chaired the Scientific Committee on Neurobiology from 1995 to 1997. He was elected a corresponding member of the Hungarian Academy of Sciences in 2001 and a full member in 2007. In addition to his academic activities, he has also played a significant role in the life of scientific associations: he was a board member of the International Behavioural Neuroscience Society (IBNS) between 1992 and 1994, president between 1999 and 2000, president of the Hungarian Neuroscience Society between 1993 and 1997, and from 1989 he was Vice President of the Hungarian Society of Physiology for a long time. He also served on the board of trustees of the Endre Grastyán Foundation. He also serves on the editorial board of Acta Physiologica Hungarica.

== Notable works ==
- "Amygdalar noradrenergic and dopaminergic mechanisms in the regulation of hunger and thirst-motivated behavior" (coauthor, 1982)
- "Self-injection of amphetamine directly into the brain" (coauthor, 1983)
- "Feeding-related activity of glucose- and morphine-sensitive neurons in the monkey amygdala" (coauthor, 1986)
- "Responses of lateral hyptohalamic glucose-sensitive and glucose-insensitive neurons to chemical stimuli in behaving rhesus monkeys" (coauthor, 1992)
- "Glucose-sensitive neurons of the globus pallidus: I. Neurochemical characteristics" (coauthor, 1995)
- "Responses to the sensory properties of fat of neurons in the primate orbitofrontal cortex" (coauthor, 1999)
- "Effects of mobile GSM radiotelephone exposure on the auditory brainstem response (ABR)" (coauthor, 1999)
- "Effects of pretreatment with PACAP on the infarct size and functional outcome in rat permanent focal cerebral ischemia" (coauthor, 2002)
- "Plasma levels of acylated ghrelin during an oral glucose tolerance test in obese children" (coauthor, 2007)
- "Is there any relationship between obesity and mental flexibility in children?" (coauthor, 2007)
- "Altered executive function in obesity: Exploration of the role of affective states on cognitive abilities" (coauthor, 2009)
- "Reduced capacity in automatic processing of facial expression in restrictive anorexia nervosa and obesity" (coauthor, 2011)
- "Positive reinforcing effect of oxytocin microinjection in the rat central nucleus of amygdala" (coauthor, 2016)

== General sources ==
- Interview on the University of Pécs website, 2018. September 4.
- Data sheet on the website of the Hungarian Academy of Sciences
- Publications of László Lénárd in the MTMT repository. 835 publications, 2544 independent references. Publication list in the Hungarian Archives of Scientific Works
- László Lénárd publishes his first-ever "A" category publication 52 in international journals. Citing articles, without self-citations 463. H-index 14.
- Science Direct. Lénárd László, 220 papers.
- László Lénárd (1944–) has 17 publications in Hungarian.
- Laszlo Lenard. English biography. Executive Committee Member: Laszlo Lenard
- László Lénárd. Interview on the University of Pécs website [https://aok.pte.hu/hu/hirek/hir/10557] 2018. September 4.
- LászlóLénárd. Data sheet on the website of the Hungarian Academy of Sciences [https://mta.hu/koztestuleti_tagok?PersonId=19236]
- László Lénárd. University of Pécs. Institute of Physiology Pécs, Hungary- ResearchGate. 185 Publications, Citations 3229.
