= Herlea =

Herlea is a Romanian surname. Notable people with the surname include:

- Nicolae Herlea (1927–2014), Romanian operatic baritone
- Alexandru Herlea (born 1942), Romanian historian, politician, professor, and ambassador

== See also ==
- Herle (surname)
