= György Vókó =

Hungarian criminologist (1946–2021)

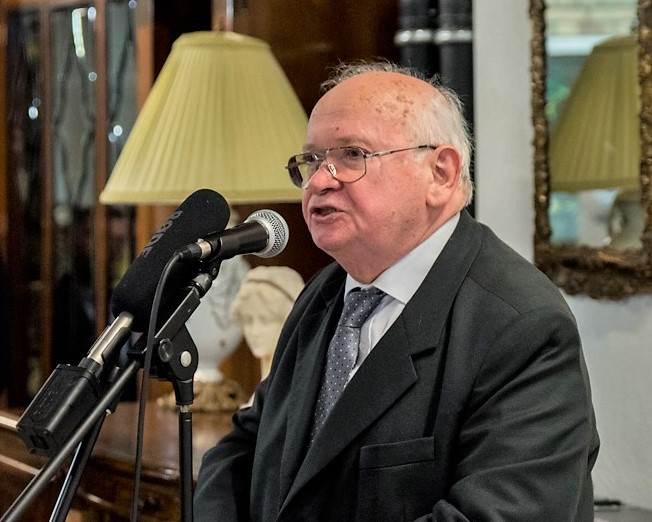
György Vókó in 2018

György Vókó (23 September 1946 – 5 April 2021) was a Hungarian criminologist, professor of criminology and criminal law, and director of Hungary's National Institute of Criminology (Kriminológiai Intézet).

Vókó was born in Magyaregregy in 1946. He graduated from the University of Pécs in 1974, where he later taught between 1994 and 2013.

He was a member of the State Audit Office of Hungary from 1991 to 2014.
