= University of Pécs =

University in Hungary

- Pécsi Tudományegyetem
- Latin: Universitas Quinqueecclesiensis
- Other names: PTE, UP
- Motto: Magyarország első egyeteme
- Motto in English: Hungary's first university.
- Type: Public research university
- Established: 1367; 659 years ago (Medieval university); 1912; 114 years ago (Modern university)
- Academic affiliations: CGU; Campus Europae; EAIE; EUA
- Rector: Dr. Adrián Fábián
- Faculty: 1485 (2021)
- Students: 22,325 (2021)
- Location: Pécs, Hungary; 46.07418280°N 18.23772200°E
- Campus: Urban
- Colours: Blue
- Website: international.pte.hu

The University of Pécs (Hungarian: Pécsi Tudományegyetem [ˈpeːt͡ʃi ˈtudomaːɲɛɟɛtɛm], PTE; Latin: Universitas Quinqueecclesiensis) is one of the largest higher education institutions in Hungary. The history of the university began in the Middle Ages, when in 1367, at the request of King Louis I the Great, Pope Urban V granted permission to found the institution. This made it the first university in Hungary and the fourth in Central Europe.

The modern university is the official successor of the Elisabeth University of Pozsony (Bratislava), founded in 1912. In 1921, after Bratislava became part of Czechoslovakia, the university was moved to Pécs in 1951, the Faculty of Medicine separated and existed as an independent institution, until it merged with the Janus Pannonius University (Hungarian: Janus Pannonius Tudományegyetem) in 2000, which united the other faculties in Pécs. This is how the current University of Pécs was created.

Approximately 25,000 students attend the university, 5,700 of whom are international students enrolled in English or German courses. As a result, it ranks among the universities in the nation with the most students. The institution supports students' academic growth through a number of clinics and research institutes in addition to its ten faculties.

== History ==
=== Medieval university (1367–c. 1390) ===
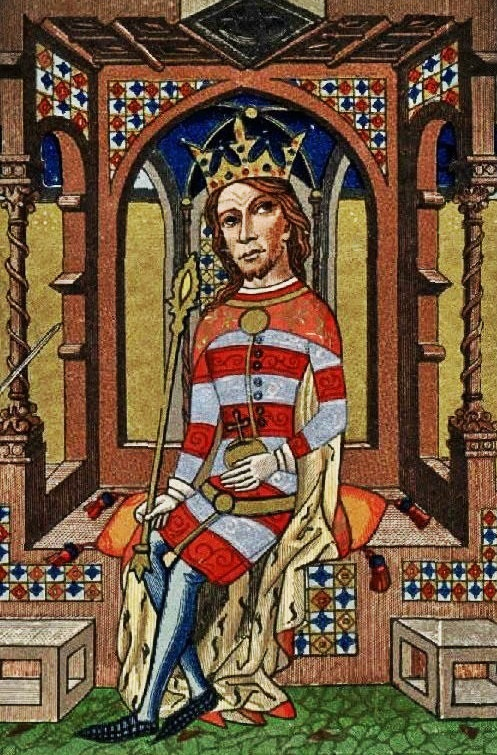
Louis I as depicted in the Chronicon Pictum

The medieval university of Pécs was founded in 1367 as the last in the first wave of Central European university foundations. (The first three universities in the region: Prague (1348), Krakow (1364), Vienna (1365).) Historical public consciousness considers Louis the Great as the founder of the university, but the king's role in the foundation can be considered formal, as part of the Holy See procedure. The operation of the University of Pécs was authorized on September 1, 1367 in a bull by Pope Urban V, at the request of King Louis the Great of Hungary. The true spiritual father of the first Hungarian university was the contemporary bishop of Pécs, William of Koppenbach, who, in addition to his ecclesiastical office (1361–1374), was royal chaplain and secret chancellor, one of Louis the Great's important diplomats and confidants.

Coat of arms of the medieval university of Pécs

The University of Pécs was primarily intended for the proper teaching of church law and the Latin language, so that the Hungarian students of the time did not have to travel abroad if they wanted to attend university. In Pécs, the faculty of humanities and law can be taken for granted, so the medieval university was truncated. The Pope did not allow the establishment of the Faculty of Theology. Very few written documents have survived about the medieval University of Pécs, and we hardly know anything about its functioning. We know a total of four teachers and seven students by name who can be proven to have taught or studied at the university. The most famous medieval professor in Pécs was the Italian Galvano di Bologna, who stayed in Pécs between 1372 and 1374.

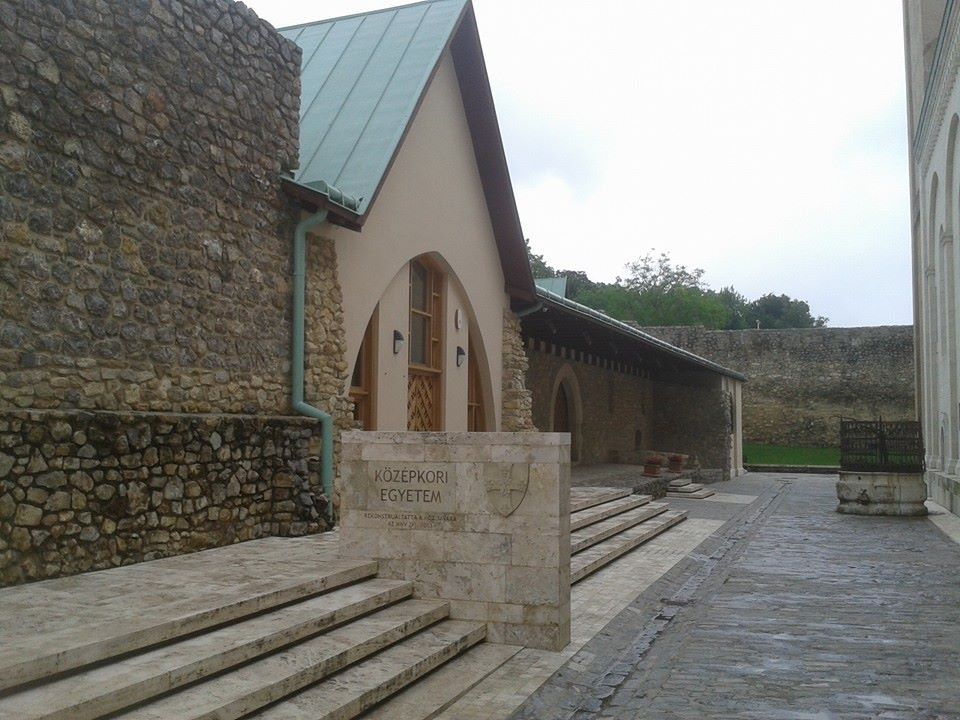
The supposed building of the medieval university of Pécs in 2015

The second and last chancellor of the university was Bishop Bálint Alsáni of Pécs (later Cardinal) (1374–1408). The university was fundamentally linked to the person of Vilmos Bishop, and then began to decline after his death, finally ending sometime around 1390, it was almost certainly not functioning when the University of Óbuda was founded in 1395. The modern Pécs University is not legally continuous with its medieval predecessor, we can only speak of an intellectual heritage. After that, university-level education did not exist in the city until the beginning of the 20th century, but the renowned and high-quality chapter school continued to exist. The supposed building of the medieval university in Pécs was excavated between 1978 and 1998 in the bishop's castle, east of the Golden Mary chapel, in the immediate vicinity of the Pécs Cathedral, on its north side. The definition of the building is disputed, many researchers do not agree that the medieval studium generale operated in the building. In 2015, a permanent university history exhibition was opened in the restored building, with important medieval Gothic sculptural monuments.

=== Modern university ===
In 1785 Joseph II moved the headquarters of the Royal Academy from Győr to Pécs for about twenty years. It was not until 1833 that Bishop Ignác Szepesy, in cooperation with the city council, founded the Academy of Pécs, with faculties of law and humanities. For the lyceum, he had an ornate palace built for 100,000 forints, which was completed in 1832. He donated 251,260 forints to the lyceum and made it his heir in his will. He arranged specialist libraries for his teachers, and placed Klimó's large library there, gifting it with 400 books, 400 minerals and numerous medals.

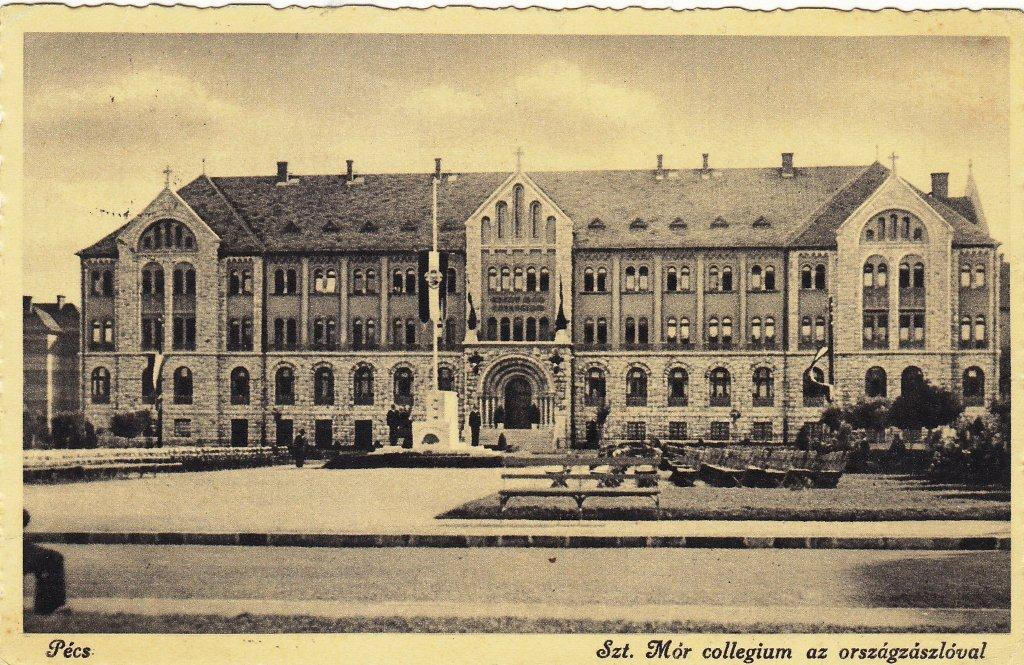
The Szent Mór College, built in 1928, is the current Rector's Office

The Royal Hungarian Elizabeth University in Pozsony (Bratislava) was founded in 1912, which can be considered the legal predecessor of the University of Pécs. At the end of the First World War, as a result of the Treaty of Trianon, Bratislava became part of Czechoslovakia. After that, in 1921, the Hungarian National Assembly adopted the law that temporarily moved the University of Bratislava to Pécs (the original seat in Bratislava became part of the new Comenius University). Delayed due to the Serbian occupation of the city, in any case the university operated from 1923 with four faculties: law, medicine, humanities and evangelical theology. The latter is in Sopron. During the Second World War, the Faculty of Humanities was temporarily moved partly to Szeged and partly to Kolozsvár, which became part of Hungary as a result of the Second Vienna Award of 1940.

In 1950, the Faculty of Evangelical Theology in Sopron was separated and upgraded to an academy. In 1951, the medical faculty continued to operate as a separate and independent university under the name Pécs University of Medicine, so the University of Pécs continued to operate with a single faculty, the faculty of law. In the meantime, improvements were made at the medical university. In 1966, the so-called 400-bed clinic was opened, in which five different units operated (internal medicine, orthopedics, radiology, surgery, ophthalmology). Dental training also began in 1973. From 1975, a new faculty of economics was established, and in 1982 the Pécs Teacher Training College merged with the Faculty of Economics and the Faculty of Law. The new institution was named Janus Pannonius University. In 1990, the Faculty of Health Sciences was established within the Medical University of Pécs.

In the meantime, the Faculty of Teacher Education was divided into the Faculty of Humanities and the Faculty of Natural Sciences. Pollack Mihály Technical College was merged with Janus Pannonius University in 1995. In 1996, the Faculty of Arts was established as the sixth organizational unit of the university. The University of Pécs was established in 2000 by the merger of the Janus Pannonius University, the Medical University of Pécs and the Gyula Illyés Teacher Training College in Szekszárd.

In 2004 the Pollack Mihály Technical College transformed into a full-fledged university faculty under the name of Pollack Mihály Faculty of Engineering. In 2005 the Faculty of Adult Education and Human Resources Development is established as the tenth faculty of the university. The College of Health Sciences becomes a full-fledged university faculty under the name of Faculty of Health Sciences in 2006. The name of the Pollack Mihály Faculty of Engineering becomes Faculty of Engineering and Information Technology. In considering the merger of the Faculty of Adult Education and Human Resources Development and the Illyés Gyula Teacher Training College of Szekszárd the Faculty of Cultural Sciences, Education and Regional Development is formed.

In 2015 the university had nine faculties. In 2016 the Faculty of Pharmacy was expected to be established, and as a result, the University of Pécs will once again, feature ten faculties. Besides the general medicine program, training in dentistry and pharmacy were launched in 1973 and 2001. Meanwhile, the English Program in General Medicine was implemented in 1984, the first medical education program of its kind in Central Europe. A similar German Program was initiated in 2004.

== Education and research ==
University rankings

Global – Overall
- QS World: 741-750 (2026)
- THE World: 1001–1200 (2025)
- USNWR Global: 1291 (2025)

Global – Business and economics
- THE Business and Economics: 801+ (2025)

Global – Liberal arts
- THE Social Sciences: 801-1000 (2025)

Global – Life sciences and medicine
- ARWU Life sciences: 401-500 (2024)
- QS Life Sciences & Medicine: 451-500 (2025)
- THE Clinical and Health: 401-500 (2025)
- THE Psychology: 501-600 (2025)

Regional – Overall
- QS Europe: 292 (2026)
- THE Europe: 404 (2025)

As part of the European higher education system, UP follows the Bologna process and offers a three-tier system that includes doctoral level programs (PhD, DLA), master level programs (MA, MSc) that last two to four semesters, and bachelor level programs (BA, BSc) that last six to eight semesters. The university also provides one-tier, undivided, five- to six-year master's degree programs in engineering, medicine, law, and the arts. Additionally, interested students can participate in short programs like summer universities, preparation courses, and partial trainings.

The Szentágothai Research Centre of the University of Pécs is a research institute established on the basis of modern international science organizational and management normatives. The Technology Transfer Office has been at the disposal of researchers, students and business partners. In order to effectively operate and develop the research infrastructure, research support laboratories have been established, which carry significant scientific and innovation potential and collaboration opportunities. More than 200 researchers from 19 research groups work in the institution, and several associated members and centers are also part of the professional community. Since September 2020, two National Laboratories have also been housed in the Pécs research center: the National Laboratory of Virology and the National Laboratory on Human Reproduction. In 2022, two more National Laboratories were established under the leadership of the University of Pécs: the National Laboratory for Renewable Energy and the National Laboratory for Translational Neuroscience.

The South Transdanubian Regional Library and Knowledge Center also belongs to the university. The former city and county library and the University Library and Knowledge Center of the University of Pécs, as well as the university's Law and Economics Library, moved into the thirteen thousand square meter, four-story building. The building has two 200-seat lecture halls and a conference room, as well as research rooms and Internet workstations. The library is open 84 hours a week, every day from eight in the morning to eight in the evening, even on Saturdays and Sundays. Free Wi-Fi is available everywhere in the building, and almost 300 computers are available to readers. The institution is also suitable for organizing community, cultural and leisure programs. The library welcomes readers from October 25, 2010. In November 2015, the library had 25,000 registered readers. The designer of the building is Balázs Mihály Kossuth award-winning and Prima Primissima award-winning architect.

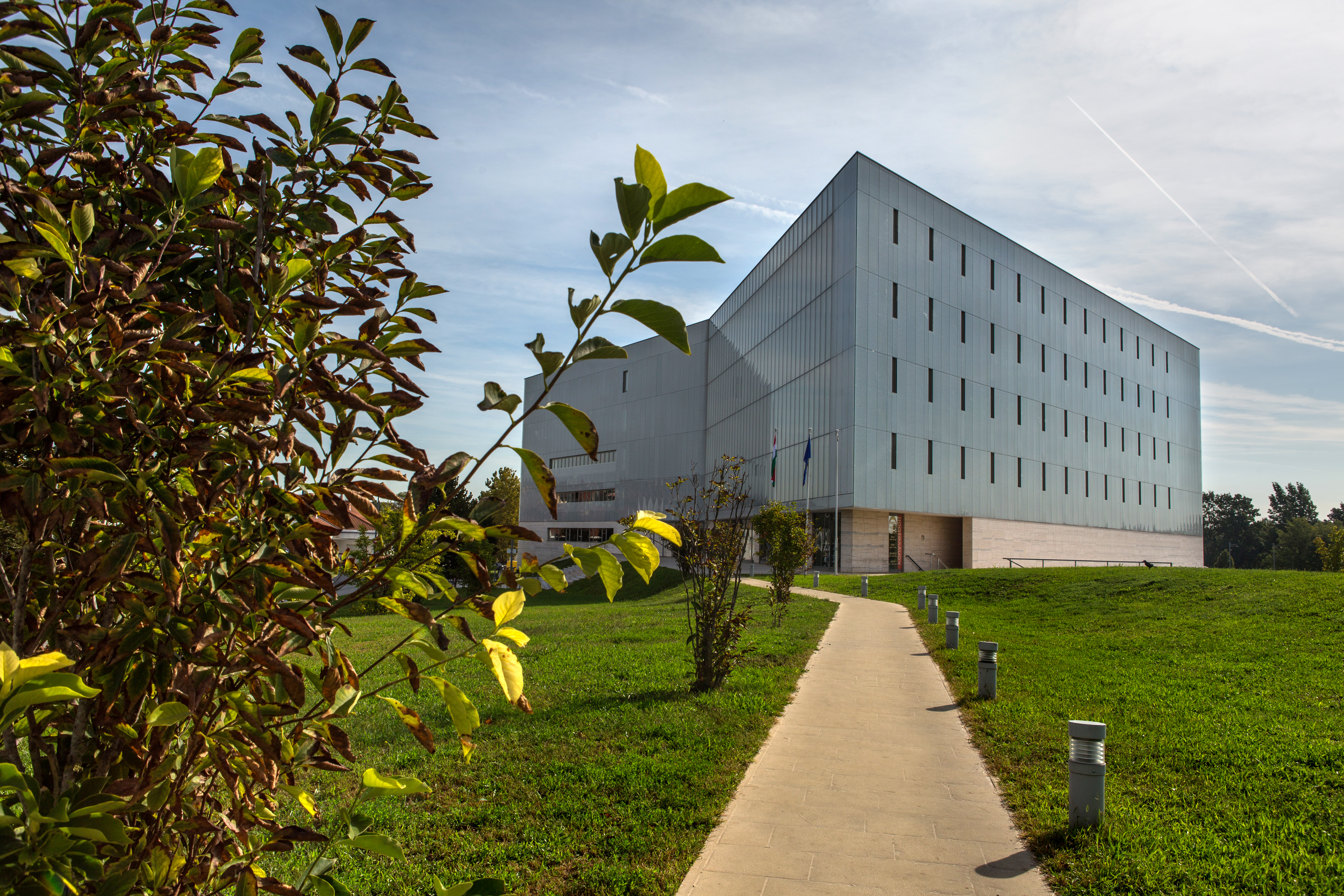
The building of the Library and Knowledge Center

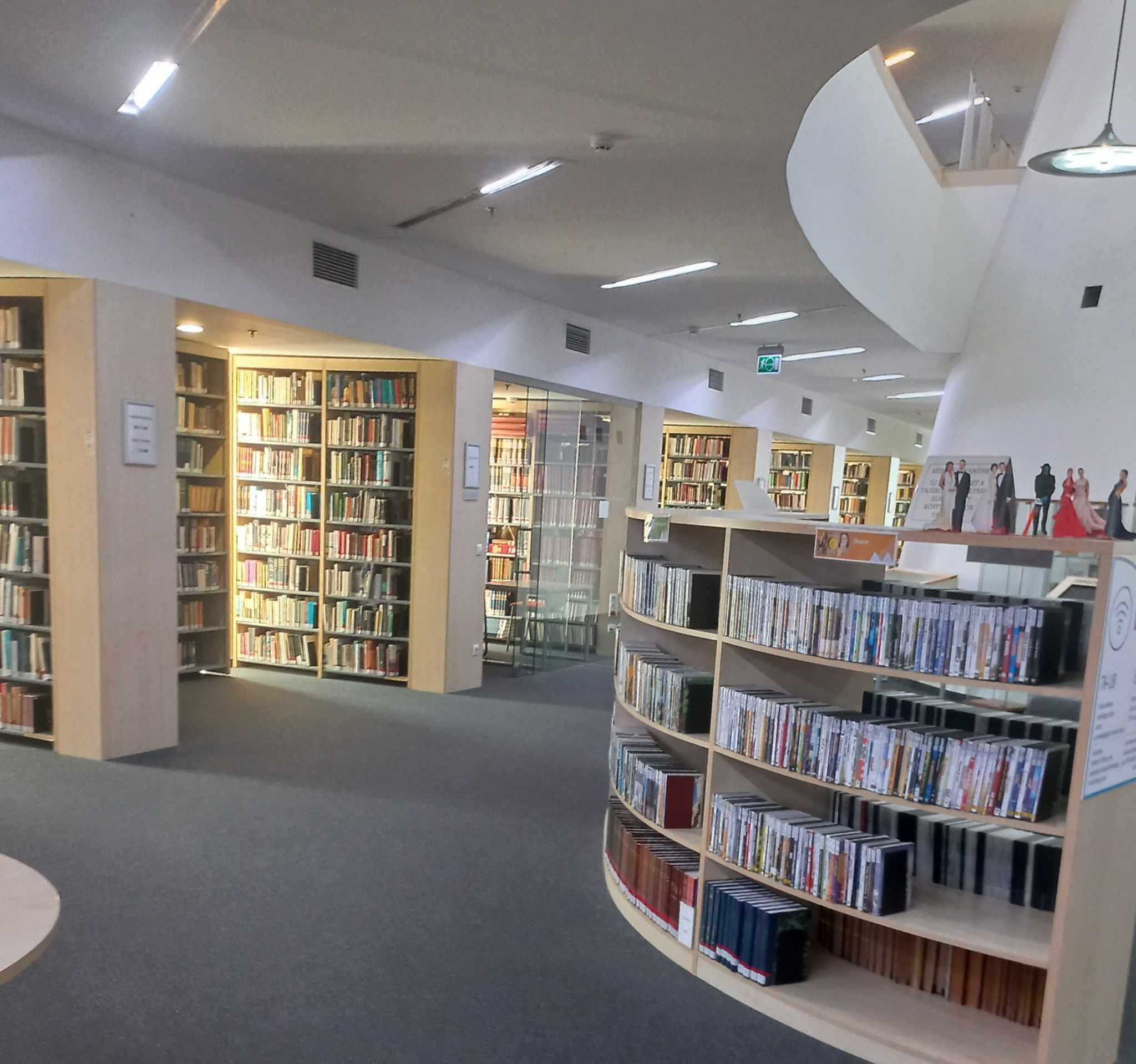
The building of the Dental and Oral Surgery Clinic

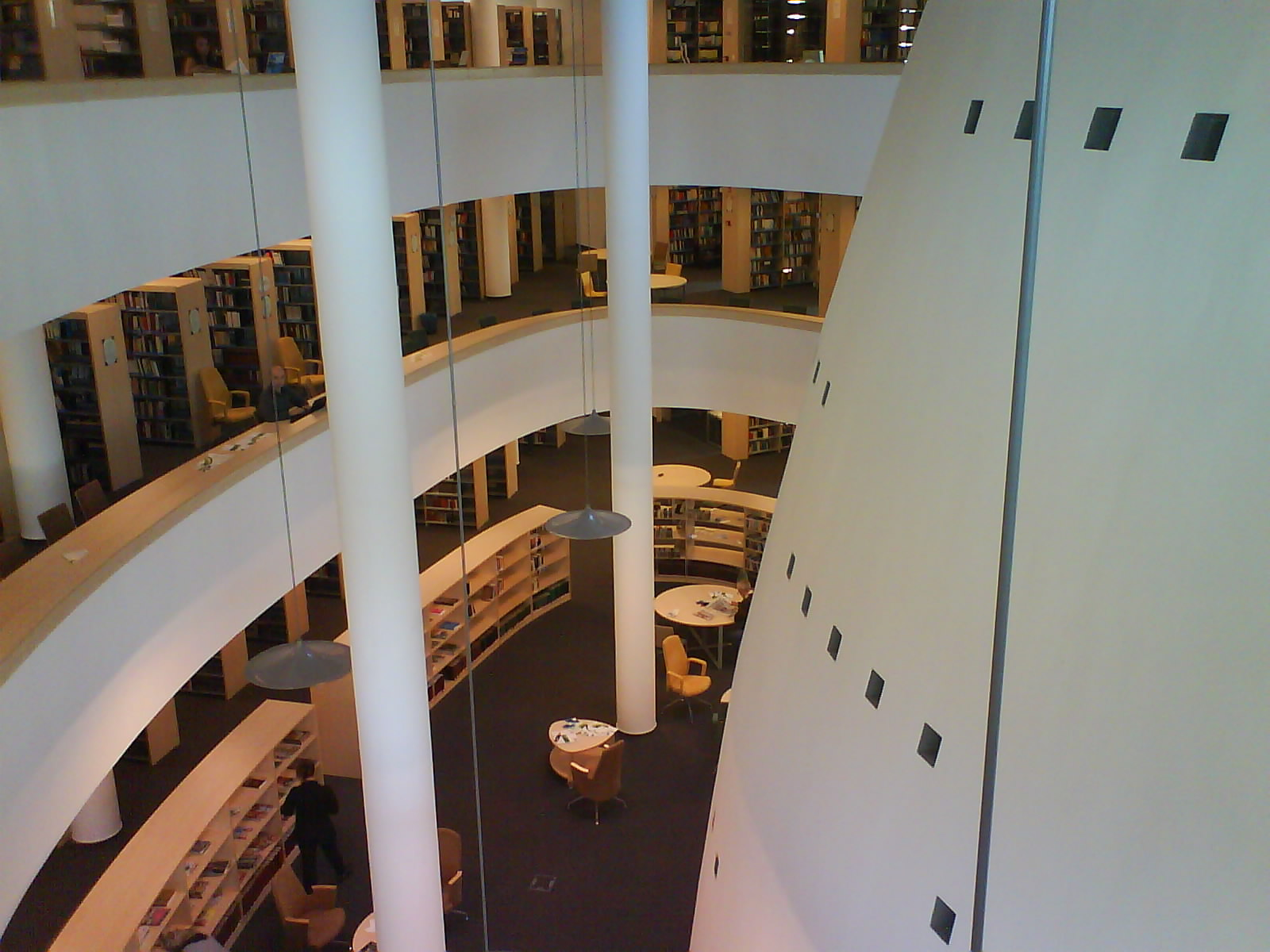
Interior of Knowledge Centre

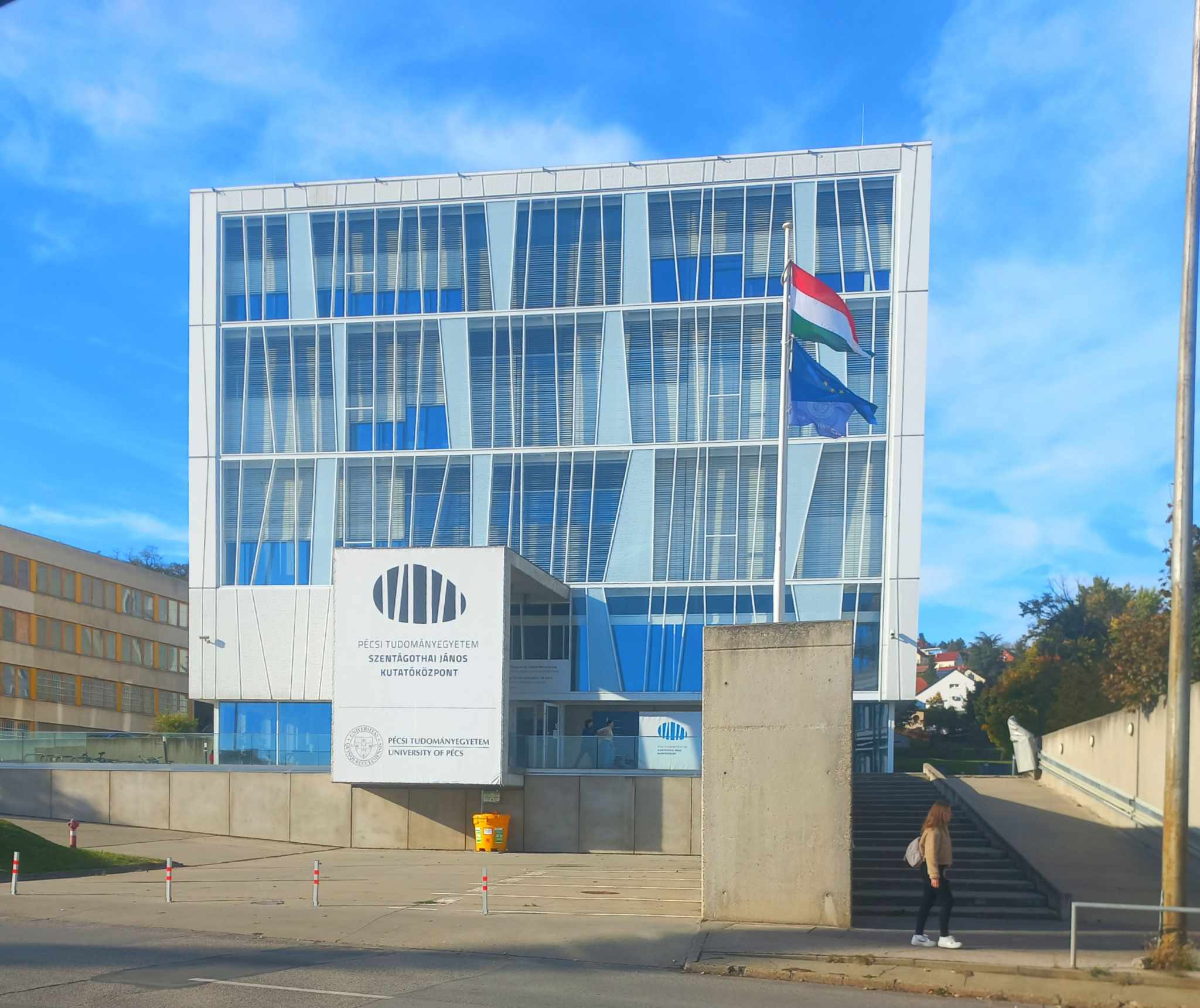
The Szentágothai Research Centre

== Faculties ==
=== Faculty of Business and Economics ===
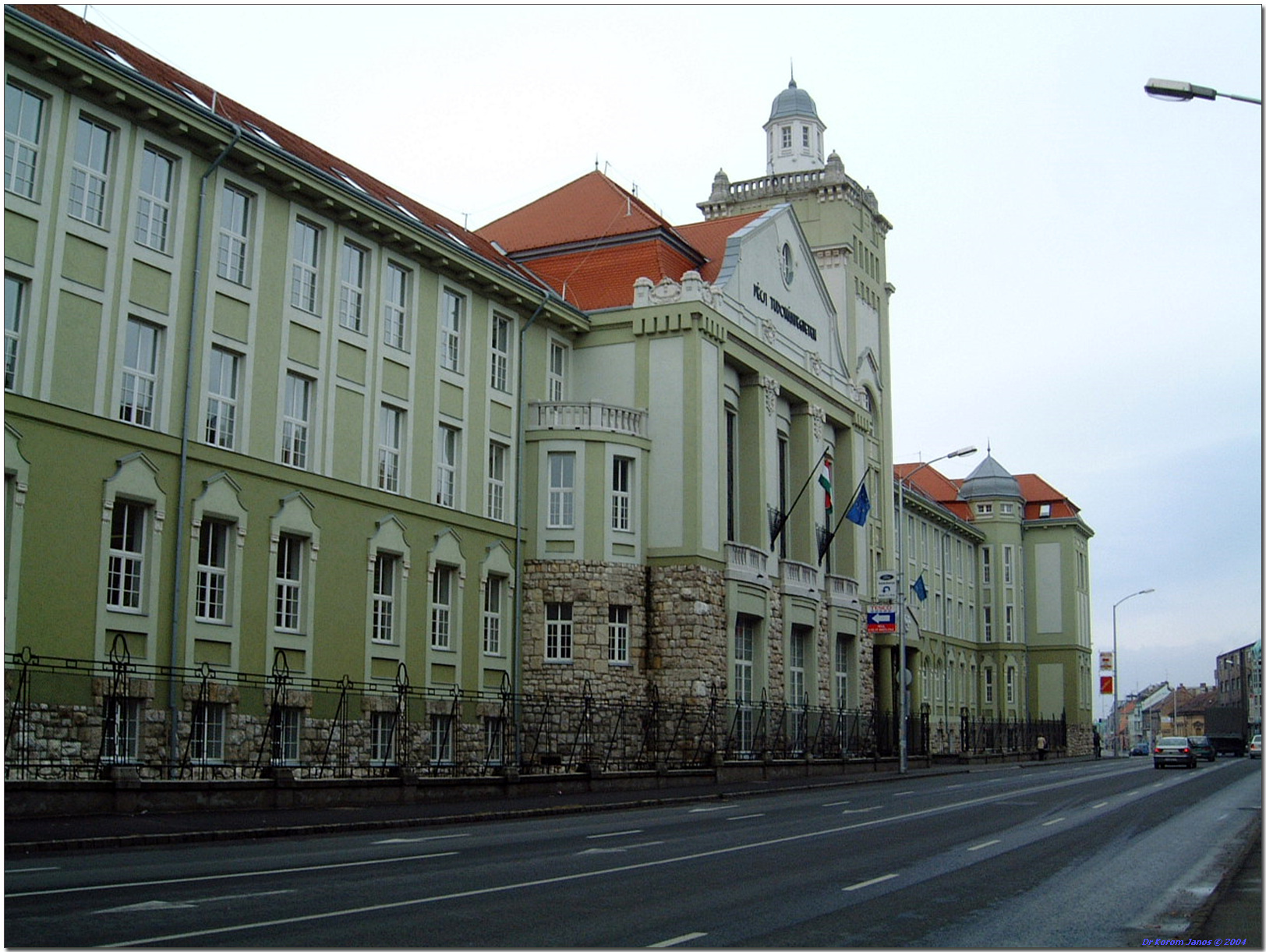
The building of the Faculty of Business and Economics

The Faculty of Business and Economics of the university of Pécs was established in 1970 and its mission has always been to cultivate, impart and teach business sciences based on a broad theoretical, methodological and social science base. In September 1970, 103 first-year students began their studies at the Pécs Branch of the Karl Marx University of Economics under the direction of István Hoóz, Professor and Head of the Faculty. In the first "experimental" years, the institution gained experience in the training of economists suitable for corporate jobs, including the development of national and international academic contacts. This was the starting point for what later became known as the "Pécs model". Pécs is the second oldest and the first non-Budapest faculty of economics in Hungary, and in the latter capacity it served to some extent as a model for the later establishment of rural faculties of economics and management. Since the second half of the 1970s, the faculty has been moving with great momentum towards meeting the needs of the corporate and business sectors. The faculty celebrated the 50th anniversary of the start of economics education in Pécs in 2020.

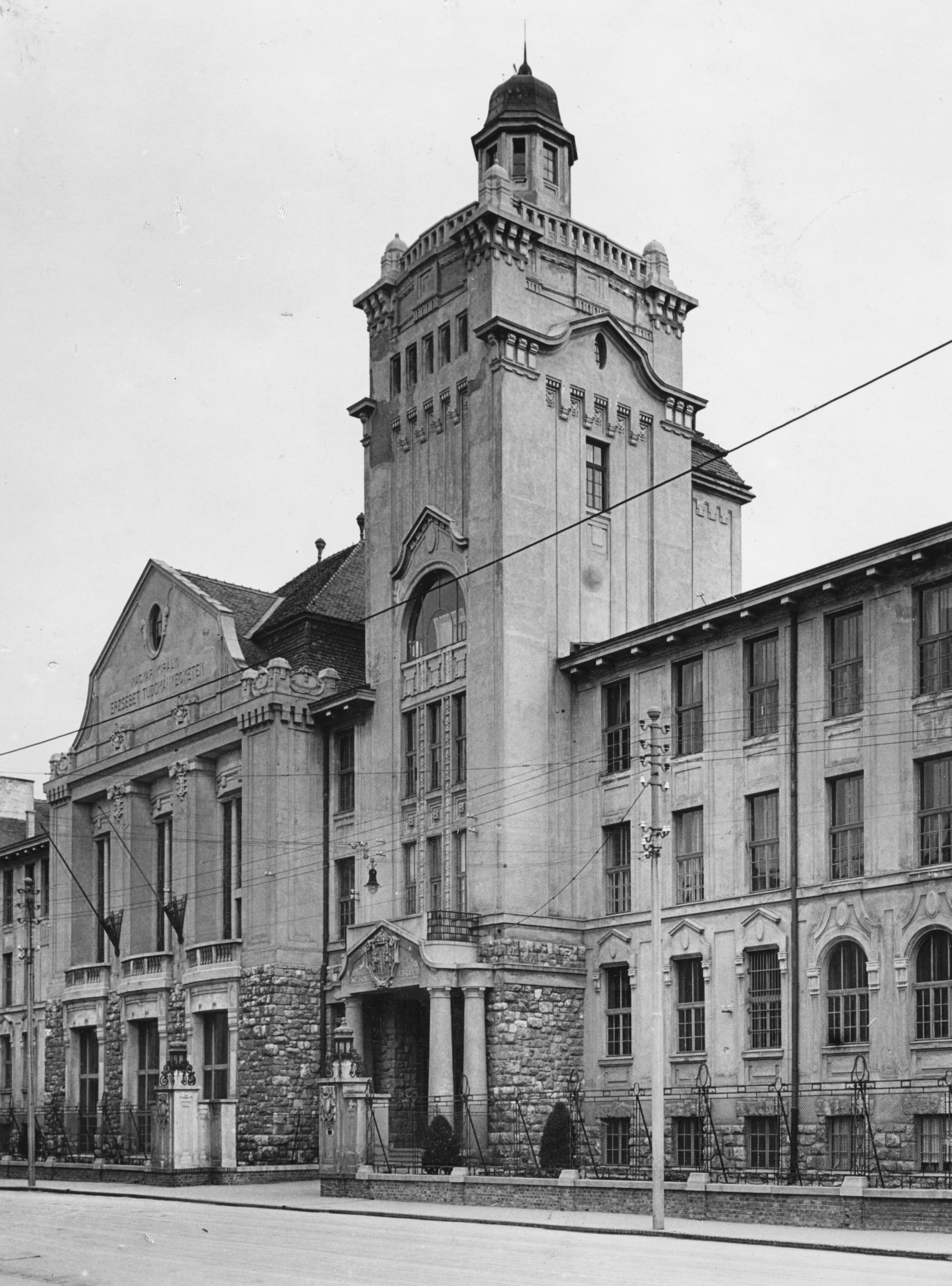
The central building of the Elizabeth University of Royal Hungary in 1940

The 1980s saw a significant improvement in the material conditions for education and scientific research. Correspondence courses were introduced, more and more foreign students were studying at the faculty, and the period also saw the start of postgraduate programmes. The development of the faculty's relations with other countries was also given considerable emphasis. A number of its faculty benefited from grants, training and research opportunities abroad funded by the Soros programme among others, and it became somewhat easier for students to gain work experience abroad.

The 90s saw the introduction of the two-tier degree programme and the launch of the MBA programme. During this period, two international partnerships were established which are still a major force in the life of the faculty (Ohio University and Middlesex University) and, more generally, a number of international cooperation initiatives (contacts, conferences, etc.) were undertaken. It was during this period that the faculty obtained its first accreditation, which took place in 1995/96, with an "excellent" rating. The decade also saw the launch of the first part-time Masters programme, the development and implementation of an English-language programme (BA then MSc), which started in 1996 as a result of a collaboration between Middlesex University Business School and PTE. The wide range of courses was completed by the launch of a doctoral programme and the development of a habilitation scheme. Other new educational programmes include the launch of the English-language Master's and Doctoral programmes, the German-language distance learning programme at the University of Hagen, the sandwich course in economics, the specialized translator training, the final accreditation of the two Doctoral Schools, and the introduction of a college course in Szekszárd. In addition to education, the infrastructure has also been improved with the reconstruction of the building complex on Rákóczi Road, 48 Square. The institution was selected by the French Eduniversal as one of the world's top 1,000 business schools. In 2020, the Business Administration and Management course at the faculty achieved EFMD EPAS international programme accreditation.

The faculty's bachelor's degree programmes are Human Resources, Business and Management (in Hungarian and English), Commerce and Marketing, Finance and Accounting, Tourism and Hospitality (in Hungarian and English). Master's Degrees in Marketing, Finance, Tourism Management, Management and Organisation (in Hungarian and English), MBA (Master of Business Administration). Doctoral Courses: Doctoral School of Business Administration, Doctoral School of Regional Politics and Economics.

=== Faculty of Cultural Sciences, Education and Regional Development ===
The faculty was established on 1 September 2015 by merging the two predecessor faculties of Adult Education and Human Resource Development and the Szekszárd-based Illyés Gyula Faculty.

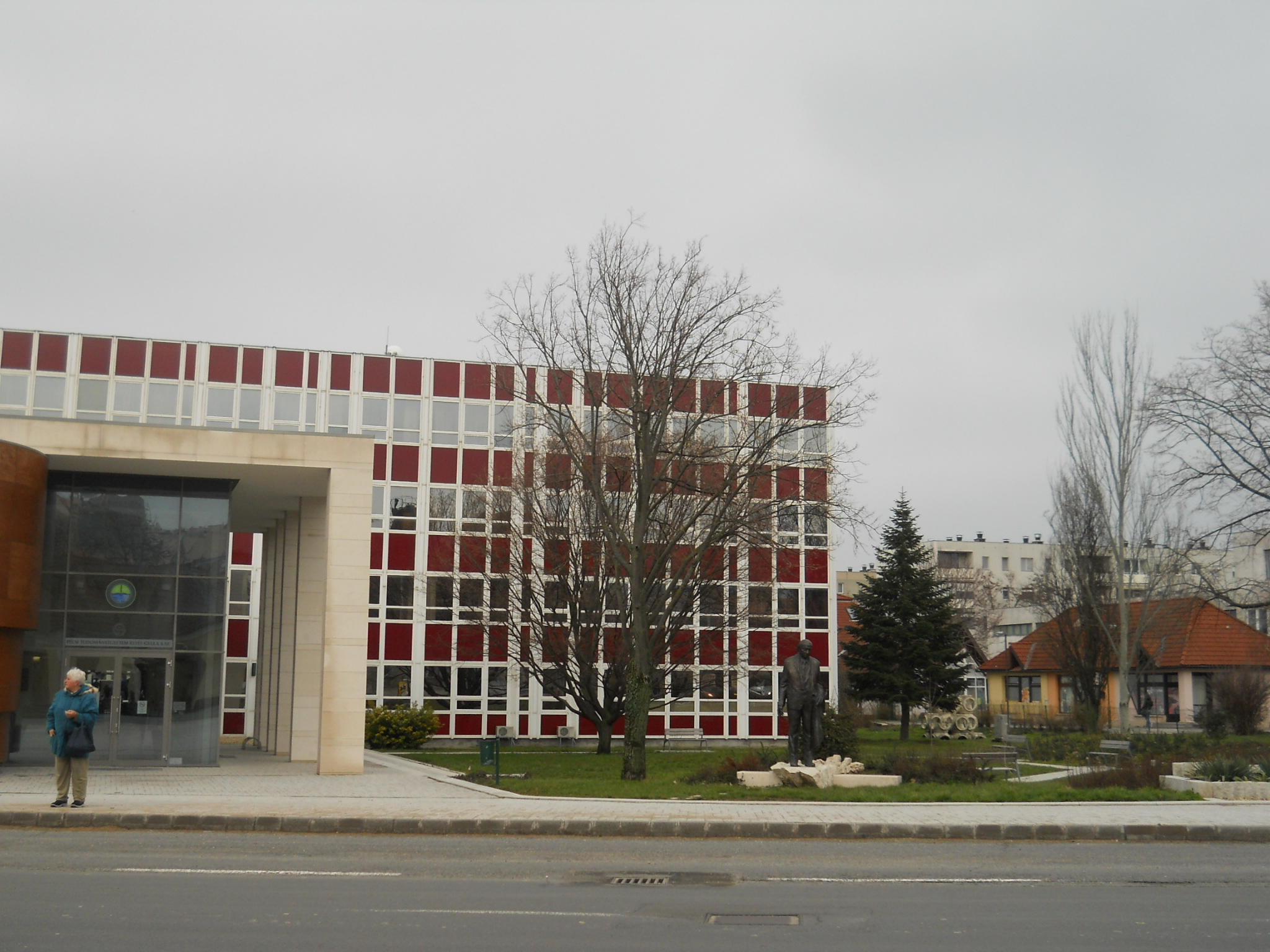
The building of the Faculty of Cultural Sciences, Education and Regional Development in Szekszárd

The history of the training centre in Pécs began in the 1973/1974 academic year of the Pécs Teacher Training College with the establishment of the "Cultural Studies Research Group". When the college became a university faculty, the department became the Department of Cultural Studies within the Janus Pannonius University. The department experienced a period of growth in the early 1990s. The increase in the number of full-time and part-time students justified the decision of the JPTE Senate and the Rector to transform the department into an autonomous branch and to create the Institute of Adult Education and Human Resource Development with three departments in September 1998. The institute was soon expanded by two new departments. In 1998, an ISO 9001 quality assurance system was introduced to guarantee the quality of the organisation's overall operations. From 2001 to 2005, the institute was an independent part of the Faculty of Sciences.

In May 2005, the Faculty of Adult Education and Human Resources Development (FEEK) was established, which was the second largest faculty of the University of Pécs with 4500 students. The faculty had five institutes and several departments with scientific research workshops.

The Szekszárd Training Centre is the only higher education institution in Tolna County, a major educational and training centre. The predecessor of the former Illyès Gyula Faculty was founded in 1977, and the college program, which started with 100 students and 13 lecturers, has been significantly transformed. The Illyés Gyula College of Education has become the Illyés Gyula Faculty of the University of Pécs as a result of a national integration process and it provides training for kindergarten teachers, German nationality kindergarten teachers, teachers, German nationality teachers, nursery teachers, general social workers and, since 2002, economics and communication specialists (communication and media studies, environmental culture). With the internal restructuring of the Institute of Economic Sciences, the faculty started training in tourism and catering, one of the few places in the world where tourism is taught today. The institution, which initially trained only teachers (first as teachers and then as nursery teachers), now offers training in five disciplines and 13 specialisations. In vocational education, students can start their studies in tourism management, hospitality management, media moderation, administration, infant and child care, youth support, and then continue their studies in Bachelor's degrees (BA) in tourism and hospitality, communication and media studies, pre-school teacher (including German nationality), social work. In the master's degree (MA), students can pursue a degree in tourism management and a degree in early childhood pedagogy. The interlocking degree structure allows for career planning, so that students can pursue several degrees within the state-subsidised training period, providing greater mobility and job opportunities. The building complex is complemented by a dormitory, a student services centre, a swimming pool and other sports facilities.

The faculty has extensive international contacts; thanks to the tradition of German national kindergarten education, mainly in German-speaking countries (University of Leipzig, Vienna Pedagogical Academy, Feldkirch Pedagogical Academy), where cooperation takes place within the framework of the Erasmus student and teacher exchange programme. The faculty has also concluded bilateral agreements with the Christian University of Partium, the University of Transylvania, the university of Nitra, the University of Osijek, the Faculty of Gheorgheni Faculty of Babeș-Bolyai University, covering a wide range of cooperation areas. The agreements include sections on practical training in schools and kindergartens, culture and sport.

=== Faculty of Engineering and Information Technology ===
The Faculty of Engineering and Information Technology was founded in 1970 as an independent college. Its predecessor institutions were: a higher technical college for civil and mechanical engineering, and a technical college of chemical engineering.

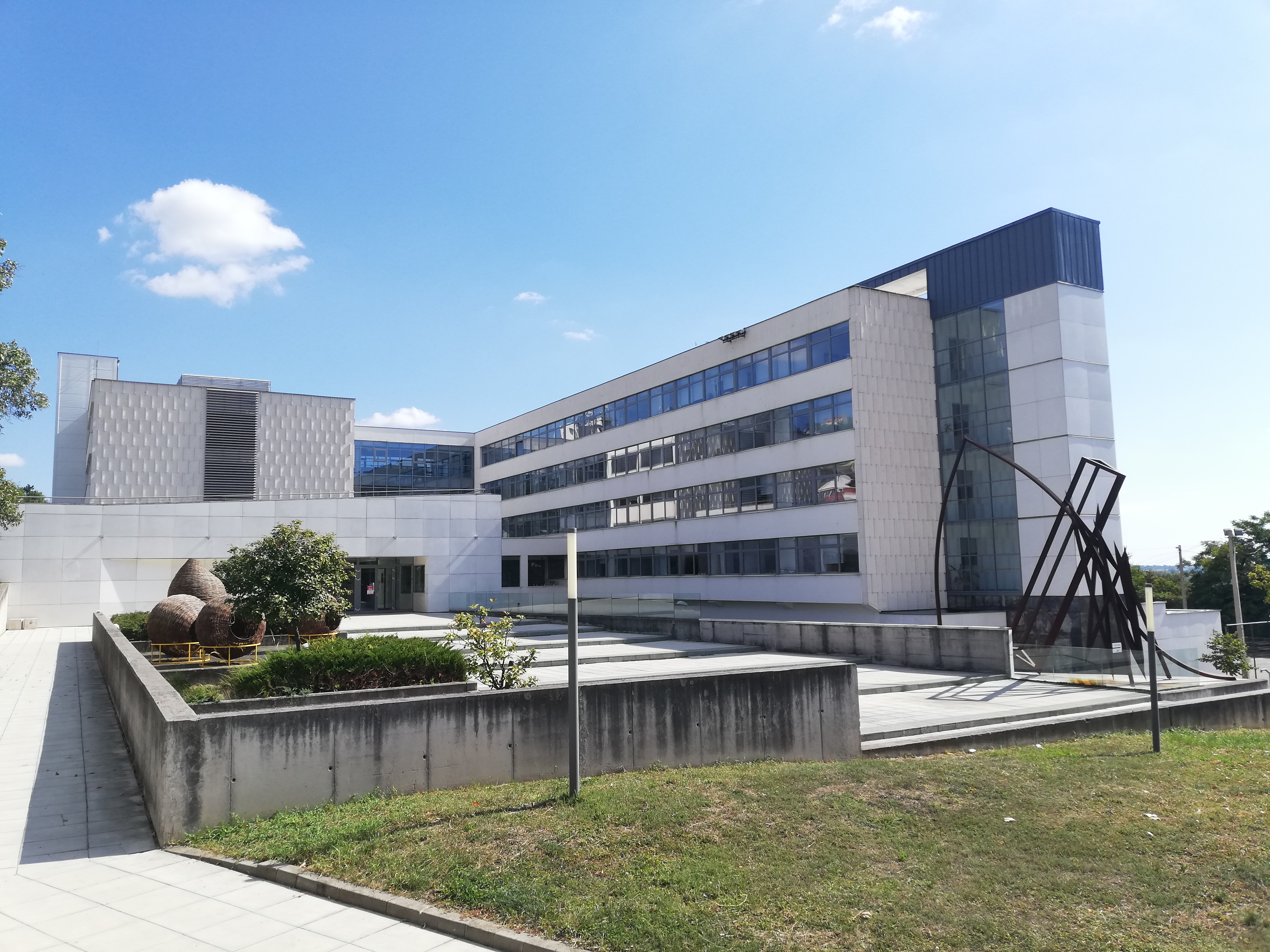
Campus of the Engineering and Information Technology

Its namesake was originally the renowned classicist architect Mihály Pollack, who gained worldwide fame in the 1800s as the architect of numerous public buildings, churches and country mansions. The college was integrated into the Janus Pannonius University of Pécs on 1 July 1995, and since 2004 it has been operating as a university faculty. In 2011, the name was changed to Pollack Mihály Faculty of Engineering and Information Technology (PTE PMMIK), thus reflecting the rise of computer engineering in education and research. From March 2015, the new name of the institution is University of Pécs Faculty of Engineering and Information Technology (PTE MIK).

The faculty's departments, academic and professional platforms often draw on the experience and innovations of the external environment around PTE, through dual teaching with an industrial partner or through external industrial chairs. The research groups and scientific workshops that thrive in the faculty are mostly working on interdisciplinary topics, sometimes going beyond the technical disciplines, e.g. medical-engineering.

In 2022, the faculty offers nine bachelor's (BA, BSc) and eight master's (MA, MSc) degrees. Students can choose from a wide range of higher education courses - technical higher education, television programme production - and further education courses, while the Breuer Marcell Doctoral School offers a PhD in architecture in addition to the DLA in civil engineering. In 2013, the faculty organised the first English-language courses in the architecture programme, and in the years since then the number of foreign students coming to MIK from all over the world has grown to more than 500. The faculty offers 12 courses in English, and the Master's in Biomedical Engineering, launched in September 2021, specifically in English. The Pollack Expo, which has been held every year since 2007 instead of the previously separate Construction, Civil Engineering and Mechanical, Electrical and Computer Engineering Days, has gained national recognition, attracting thousands of visitors. The event, which combines a trade exhibition, international and national conferences, training courses for engineers and job fairs, is a meeting place for university, industry and engineering communities in the spirit of tradition, innovation and cooperation.

=== Faculty of Health Sciences ===
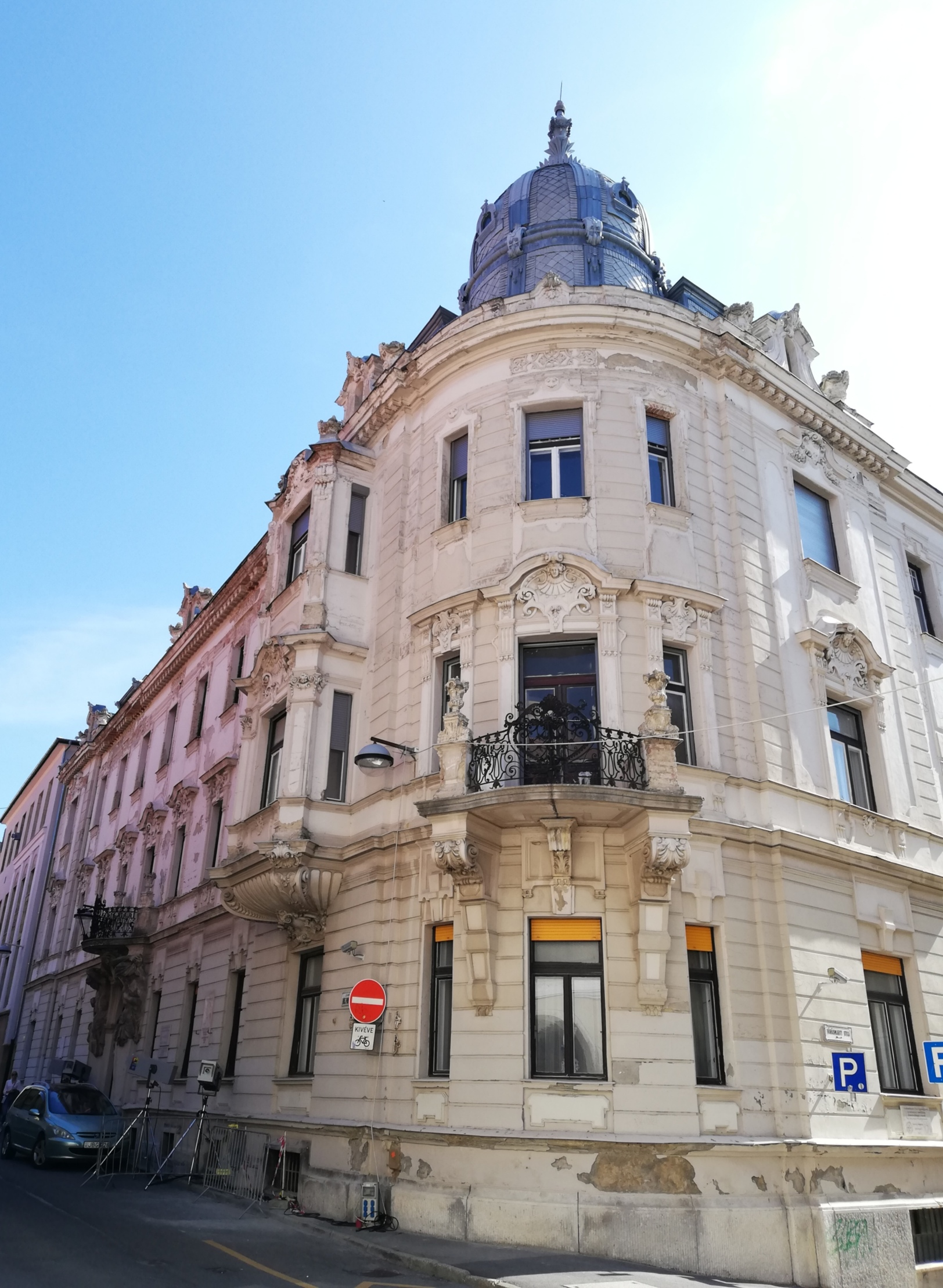
The building of the Dean's Office of the Faculty of Health Sciences

The Faculty of Health Sciences is one of the Faculties where teaching began in 1990. At the University of Pécs Medical School, the health sciences college education was launched on 1 September 1990 on the basis of the "Founding Act" of the Minister of Social and Health Affairs dated 18 August 1989, following the joint preparatory work of the Ministry, the POTE and the leaders of Somogy, Zala and Vas counties. The following period was marked by the continuous development and expansion of the training. As there were several types of trainings in each town, administrative units were set up with the name "training centre" and the status of an institute. The increase in the number of students, teachers and teaching assistants, and the establishment of a college of teachers, created a de facto faculty structure. The next task was to codify it in law. Government Decree 132/1995 (9.11.1995) recognised the de facto faculty structure de jure.

Education takes place in four training centres in Kaposvár, Pécs, Szombathely and Zalaegerszeg, where effective cooperation has been established with local teaching hospitals and social institutions. In terms of the number of students, the number of elective courses, the number of teaching staff and teaching assistants, and the number of training places, the faculty is the largest of its kind in the country.

The faculty the first in the country to offer university courses such as nurse and midwife training. This has created the possibility for health professionals to obtain a doctoral degree, which is now available at the faculty's Doctoral School of Health Sciences.

From 1 March 2006, the Faculty of Health Sciences became a university faculty. In the European Union, two of the seven specialisations automatically recognised under Community law (nursing and midwifery) are recognised as qualifications in this field.

=== Faculty of Humanities and Social Sciences ===
The Faculty of Humanities and Social Sciences represents three main [discipline]s: [humanities], social sciences and psychology/education. The faculty is one of the largest at UP.

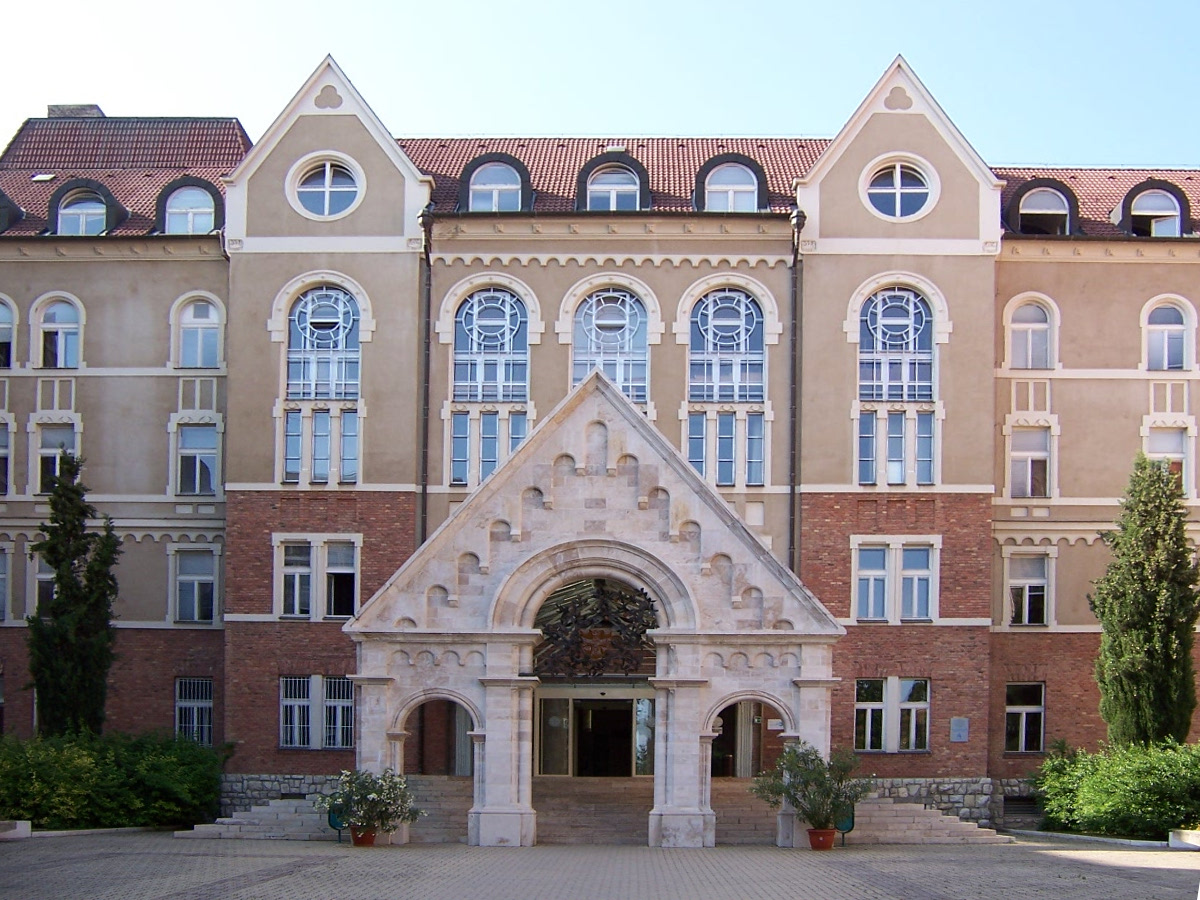
The main building of the Faculty of Humanities and Social Sciences

The history of the faculty goes back hundreds of years. The Royal Academy of Győr, which also had a Faculty of Philosophy, was first established in Pécs in 1785 by Emperor Joseph II. The institution returned to its original seat in Győr in 1802, but training was again offered in the county seat in 1828, when Bishop Ignác Szepesy started a philosophical studio, a home course that was the foundation for theological studies. Four years later, the bishop's library, made public by Bishop György Klimó and considerably enriched by Ignác Szepesy, was moved to its present location. In the following year, Bishop Ignác Szepesy founded the Episcopate Lyceum Quinque Ecclesiae, the Episcopal Law Academy of Pécs, which included a faculty of philosophy.

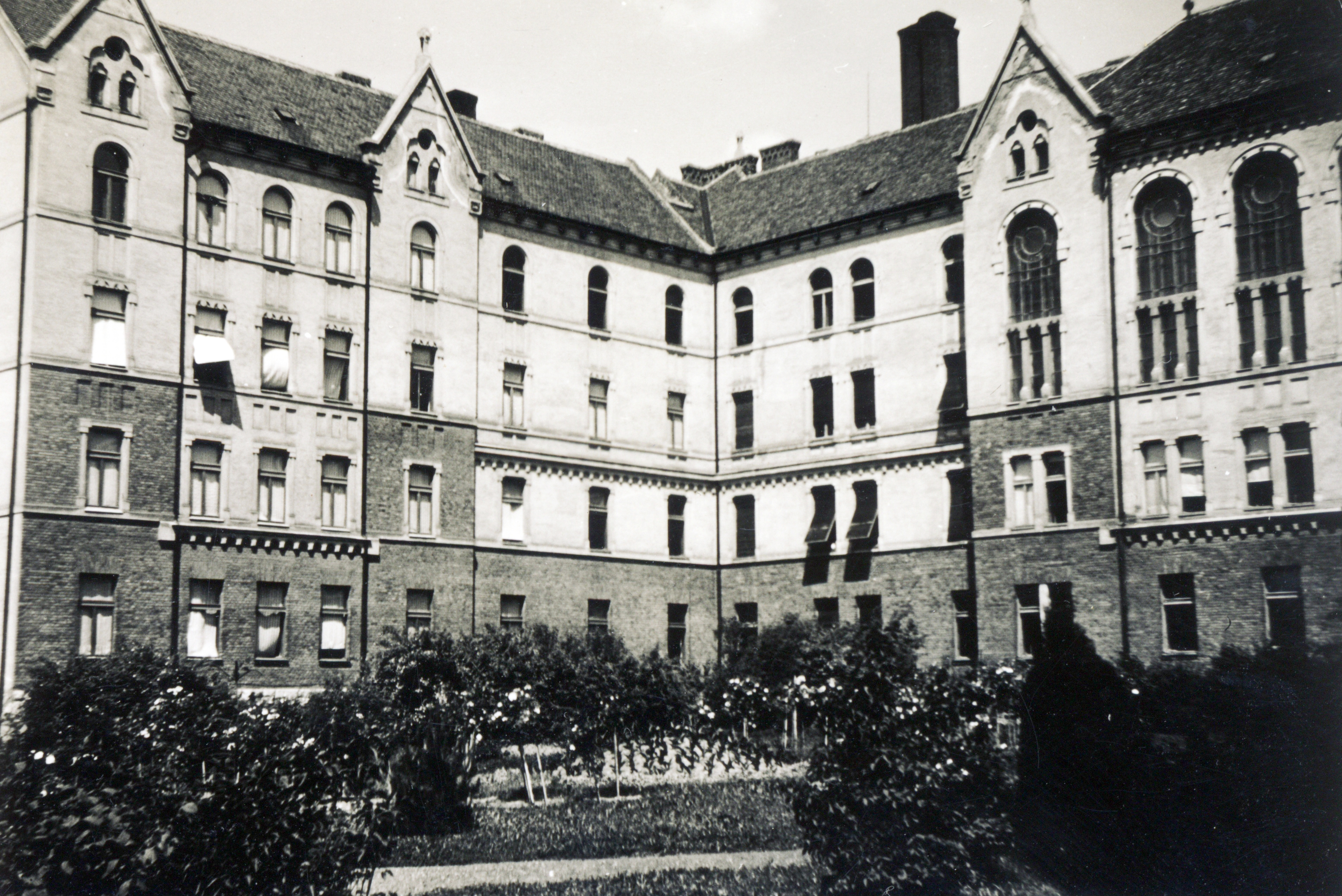
The former Jesuit Pius high school and boarding school in 1914

Education in Hungarian began in 1923, when the Erzsébet University of Pozsony was transferred to Pécs, but in 1940 the Faculty of Humanities was moved to Szeged and partly to Kolozsvár. Humanities education was restarted in 1982 when the Faculty of Teacher Training, the successor of the Pécs College of Education founded in 1948, joined the Faculty of Law and the Faculty of Business and Economics, and the merged institution took the name Janus Pannonius University. In 1992, the Faculty of Teacher Education was split into two parts and the Faculty of Humanities and the Faculty of Sciences were established. In the same year, the Faculty of Humanities became the first in the country to introduce a "unit of study" system, the forerunner of the credit system.

In 2000, the University of Pécs was established by the merger of the Janus Pannonius University, the Medical University and the Illyés Gyula Pedagogical College in Szekszárd, which at that time had nine faculties. In line with national trends, as a result of the Bologna process, the two-level training system with bachelor and master degree courses was also introduced at the Faculty of Humanities of the University of Pécs in 2006.

The Faculty of Humanities of the University of Pécs is an autonomous teaching, research and academic community unit. From 1 August 2020 it was renamed the Faculty of Humanities and Social Sciences.

=== Faculty of Law ===
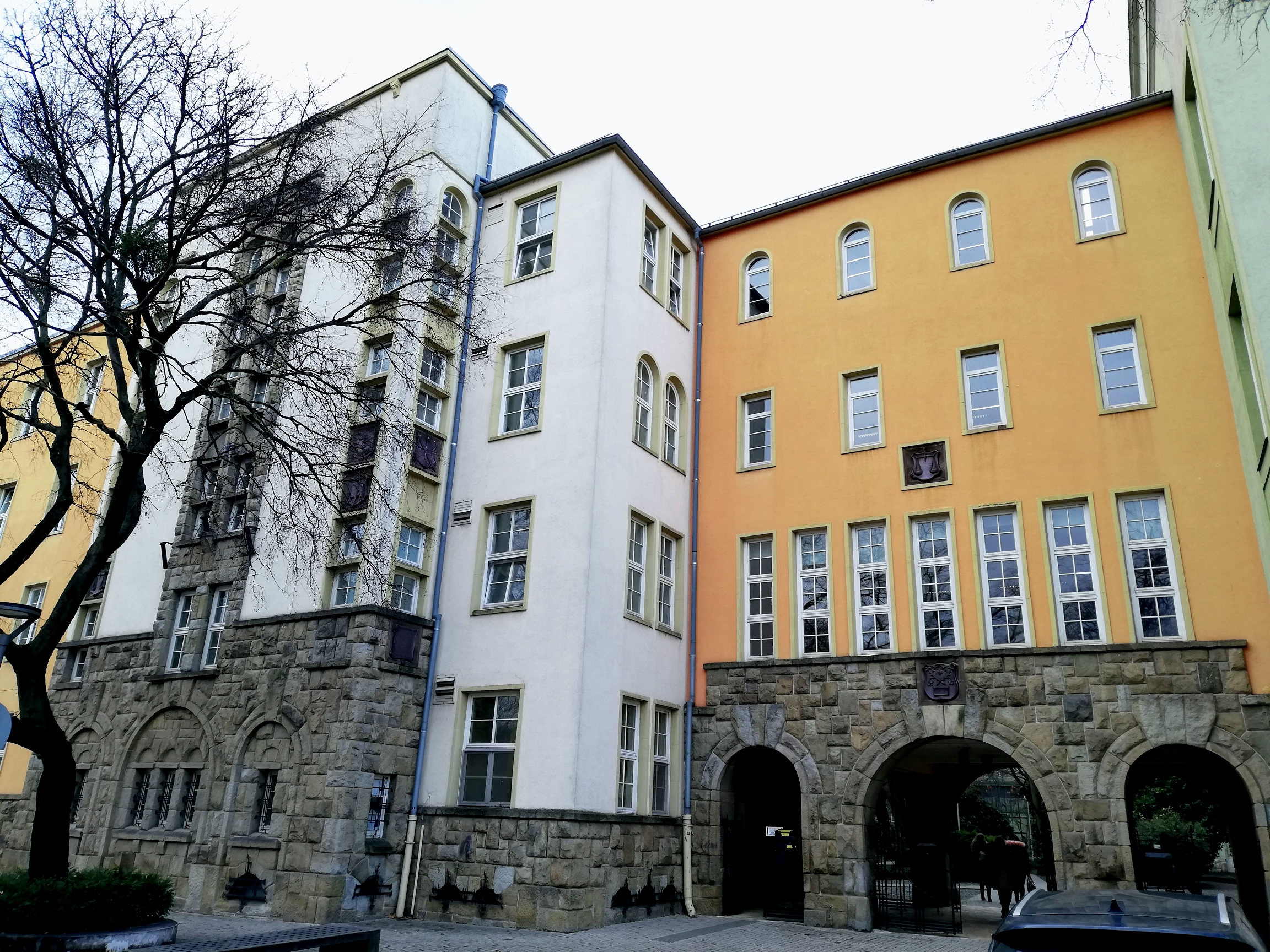
The entrance to the Faculty of Law building

The roots of higher education in law in Pécs date back to 1367, when the first Hungarian university was founded. As the periods of peace and war alternated in Hungarian history, so did the education of lawyers in Pécs. During the Hungarian Reform Era, generations of jurats were able to study in the law school brought to Pécs by Ignác Négyesy Szepesy, and after the 1848–49 revolution and the Hungarian War of Independence, the institution was renewed under the name of the Pécs Academy at the time of the Compromise. In 1921, the Royal Hungarian Elizabeth University, which had fled from Bratislava, was given a new home here and began its activities two years later, in 1923. In 1982, it became the Janus Pannonius University, and after the integration of higher education in 2000 it became the University of Pécs.

The faculty's departments are currently located in three buildings. The Europe Centre, the European Documentation Centre and the Faculty Library are located in the Knowledge Centre, which was inaugurated in 2010. The faculty provides high quality training for more than 1000 students in the field of law and administration at all levels of education. The courses are offered on a full-time and part-time basis, with state subsidies and reimbursement of costs. The Doctoral School provides training and preparation for academic PhD degrees for nearly one hundred graduates.

=== Faculty of Music and Visual Arts ===
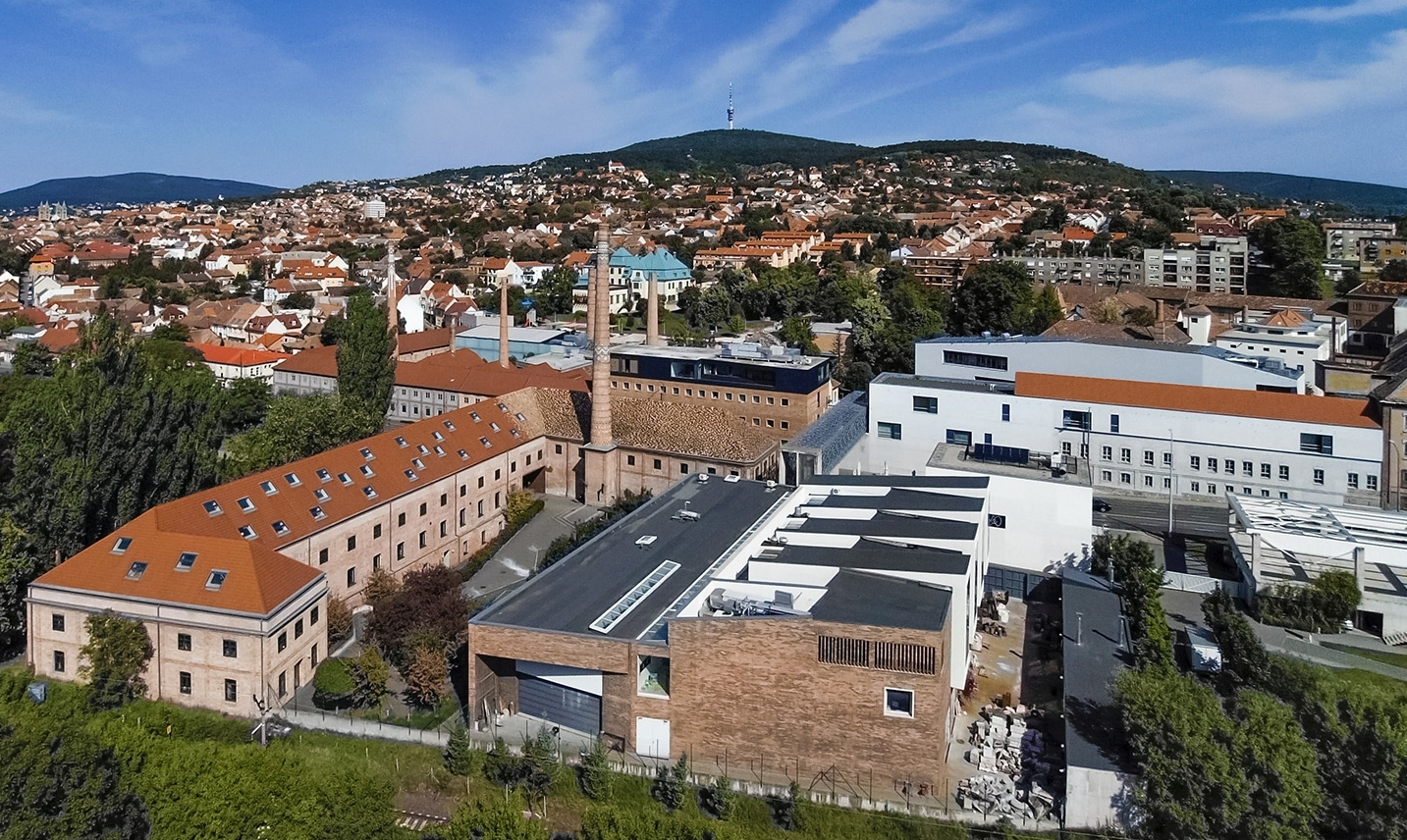
Buildings of the Faculty of Music and Visual Arts in the Zsolnay Quarter (Image: Gábor Horváth)

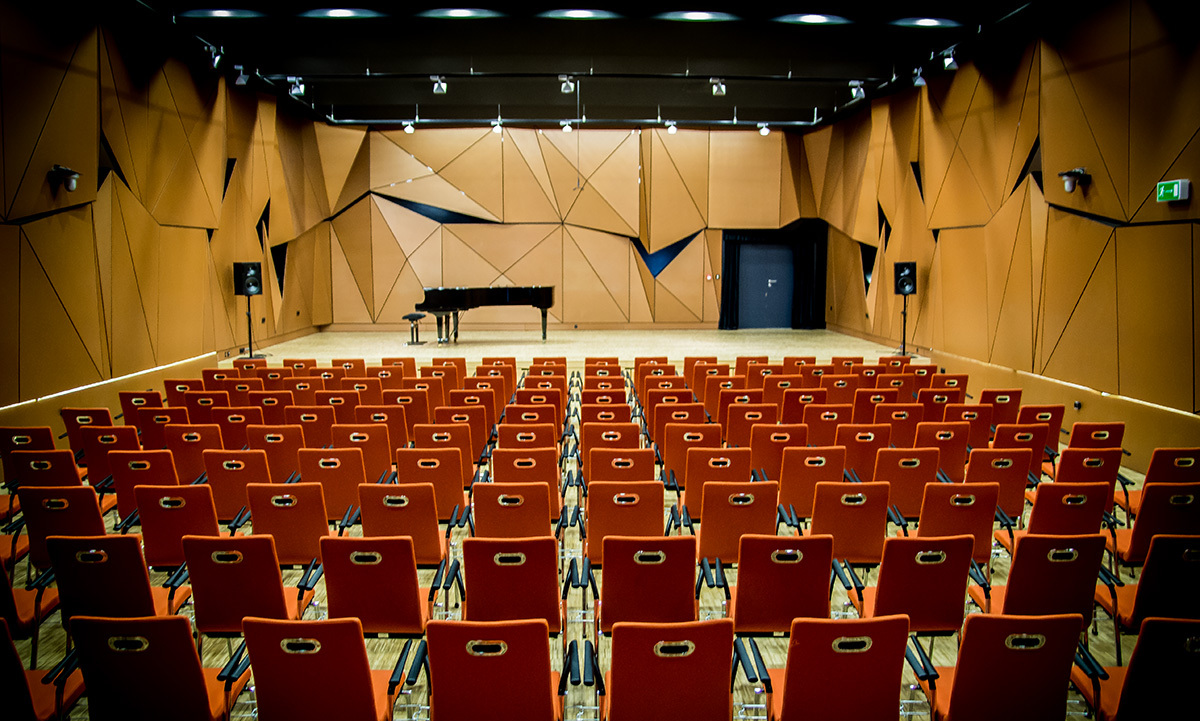
Liszt Ferenc Concert Hall

The cultural life of Pécs is outstanding in both the fields of music and fine arts, even from a national perspective. The artistic life and the fine and musical artists gathered in Pécs helped to establish the Faculty of Music and Visual Arts in 1996 from the various art departments of its legal predecessors. It is the only center in the country that provides integrated higher education in music, fine arts, applied arts and media arts. The city's artistic traditions and cultural life, the university background, and the city's personalities provide a basis for artistic training. The education provided here, in a university environment, also ensures a high level of artistic training − the doctoral degree in art. The training also includes media techniques that define the era and affect art, as well as research programs in music and visual art informatics. With approximately 700 students and more than 100 instructors, the faculty is a shaper of the cultural life of the city and the region. Its art teachers and students are regular participants and award winners of national and European art events. The cultural life of Pécs is outstanding in both the fields of music and fine arts, even from a national perspective. The artistic life and the fine and musical artists gathered in Pécs helped to establish the Faculty of Music and Visual Arts in 1996 from the various art departments of its legal predecessors. It is the only center in the country that provides integrated higher education in music, fine arts, applied arts and media arts.

The building housing the Faculty of Music and Visual Arts was located at 20 Damjanich Street for many years, until the University Quarter of the Zsolnay Quarter was completed in 2011, so the Faculty was moved to the city's new cultural center, where it can accommodate students interested in art training in high-quality conditions. The Faculty's independent educational and research organizational units are: Institute of Design and Media Arts, Institute of Fine Arts, Institute of Music, Department of Art History. The Department of Fine Arts in Sepsiszentgyörgy belongs to the Institute of Fine Arts, where students can apply for painting and sculpture training. The organizational framework of the Faculty's doctoral training is the Doctoral School of Art. The programs offered by the Faculty of Music and Visual Arts are: sculpture, painting, restoration, intermedia, art therapy, graphic design, designer making (ceramic design, metalwork, glass design, fashion and textile design), music (instrumental performance art, singing, jazz, choir director), teacher training programs (instrumental music teacher, jazz teacher, singing-music teacher, visual artist teacher, design and visual art), electronic music media art, doctoral (DLA) training in the field of fine arts and music. Foreign students participate in programs in English.

=== Faculty of Pharmacy ===
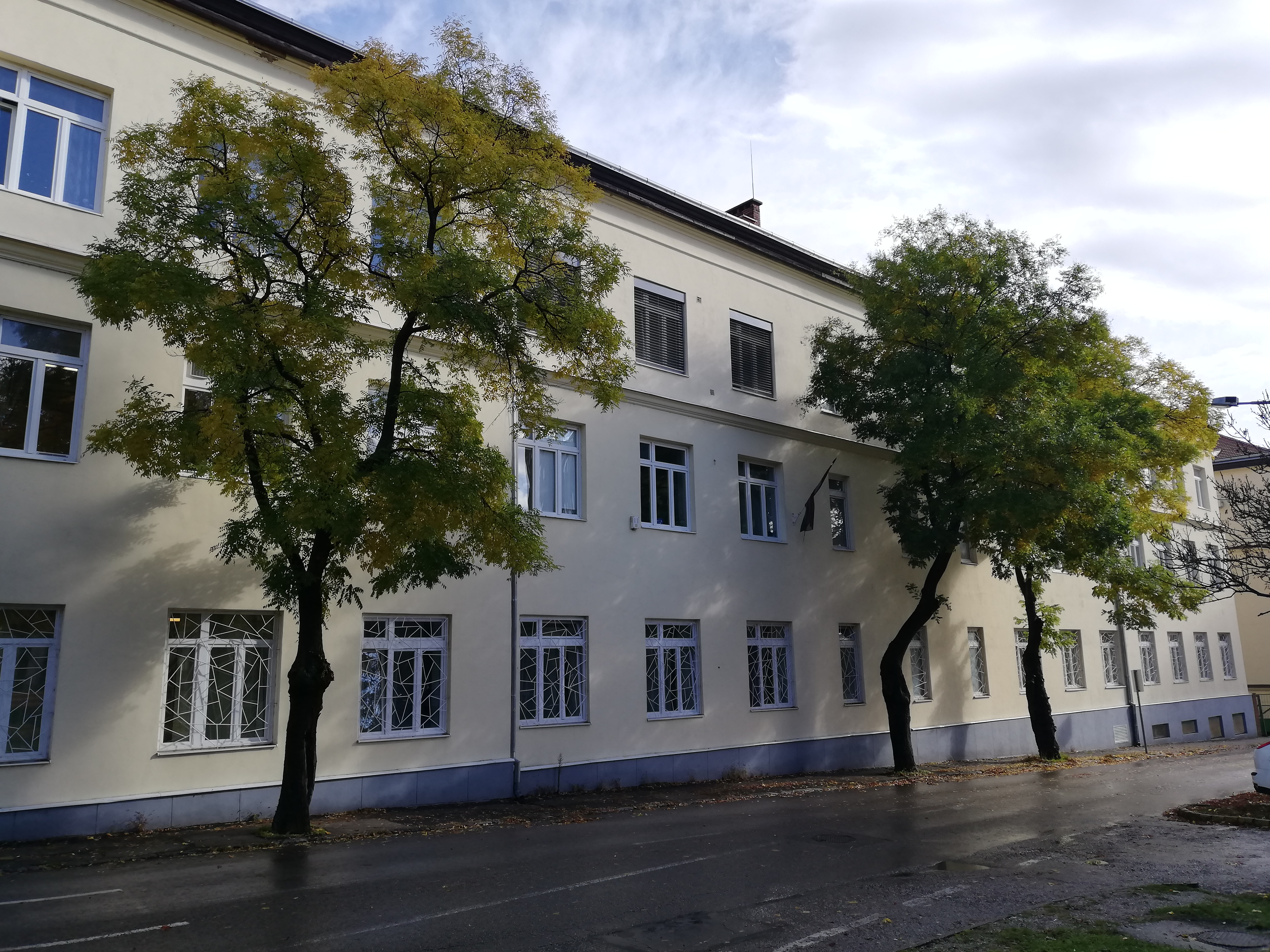
The building of the Faculty of Pharmacy

The University of Pécs, with the establishment of the Pharmacy Institutes, as the only pharmacy training centre in Transdanubia, started its activities in September 2000. The School of Pharmacy was accredited by the Hungarian Accreditation Commission (MAB) in 2006. The independent Faculty of Pharmacy was established in 2016, and as a result, the University of Pécs will once again, feature ten faculties.

Pharmacists, as experts in the field of medicine, are involved in a wide range of activities to meet the needs of society. They are involved in the production and control of pharmaceuticals, the effects of medicines, the interactions between active substances, the bioavailability of different medicinal products, and the rational, economical and effective use of medicines and medicinal products. The degree is obtained by completing a 5-year one-tier Master's programme. During the first semesters of the course, the focus is on the acquisition of basic knowledge in biology, chemistry and physics. Medical theory and practical skills are acquired through the study of anatomy, physiology, pathophysiology, microbiology and immunology. From the third year onwards, students are introduced to the professional subjects of pharmacy, with particular emphasis on pharmacological chemistry, pharmacokinetics, biopharmaceutics, pharmaceutical technology, pharmacognosy, pharmacotherapy and pharmaco-economics.

In the tenth semester of their studies, students participate in internships and complete their thesis. Students interested in scientific work can join a research group in one of the institutes. Students also have the opportunity to obtain a PhD degree through the faculty's Doctoral School of Pharmacy. After graduation, 3–5 years of postgraduate training provide the opportunity to obtain a specialist pharmacist qualification in about 15 different specialties.

=== Faculty of Sciences ===
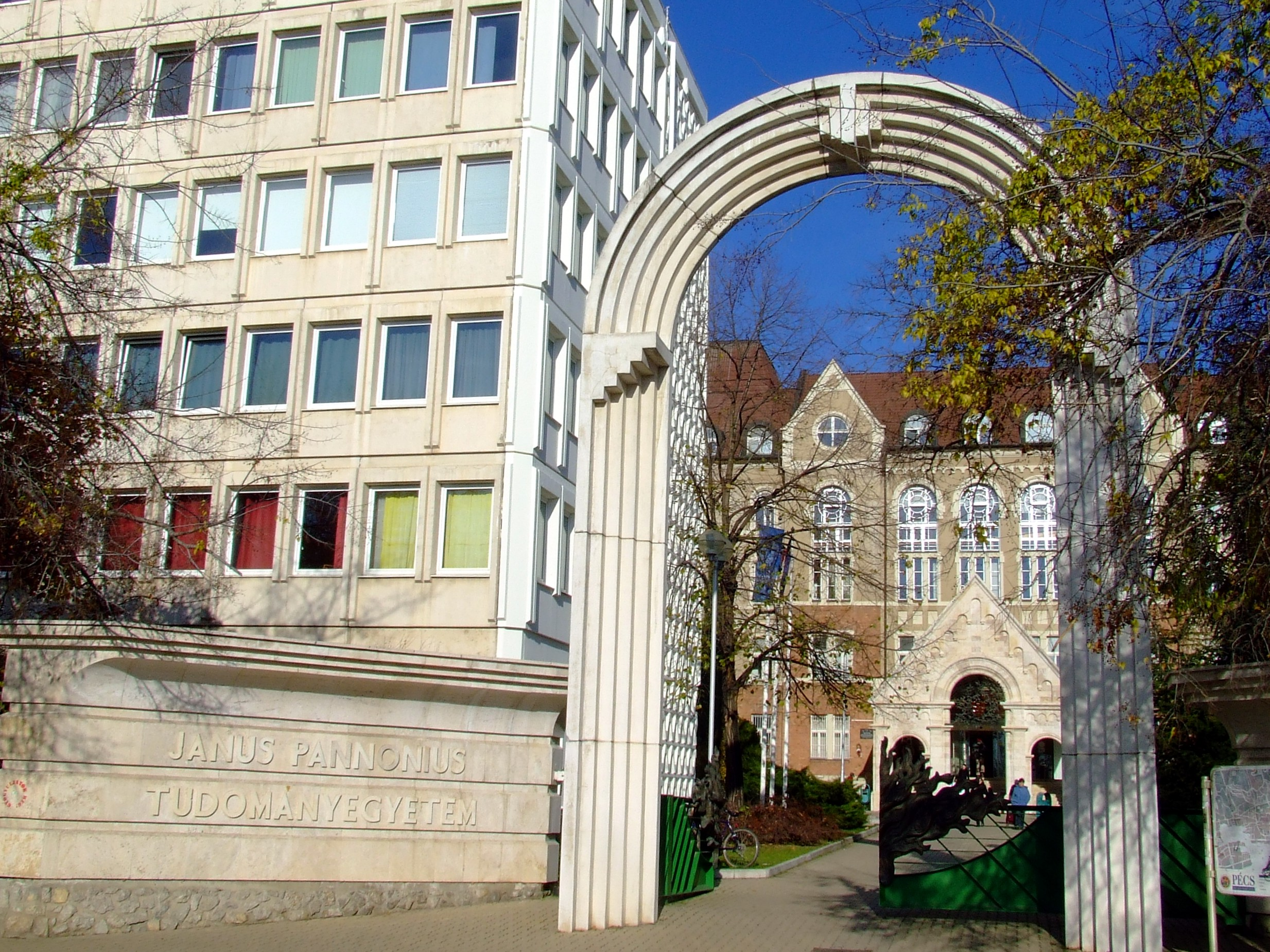
The entrance to the Faculty of Sciences of the University of Pécs

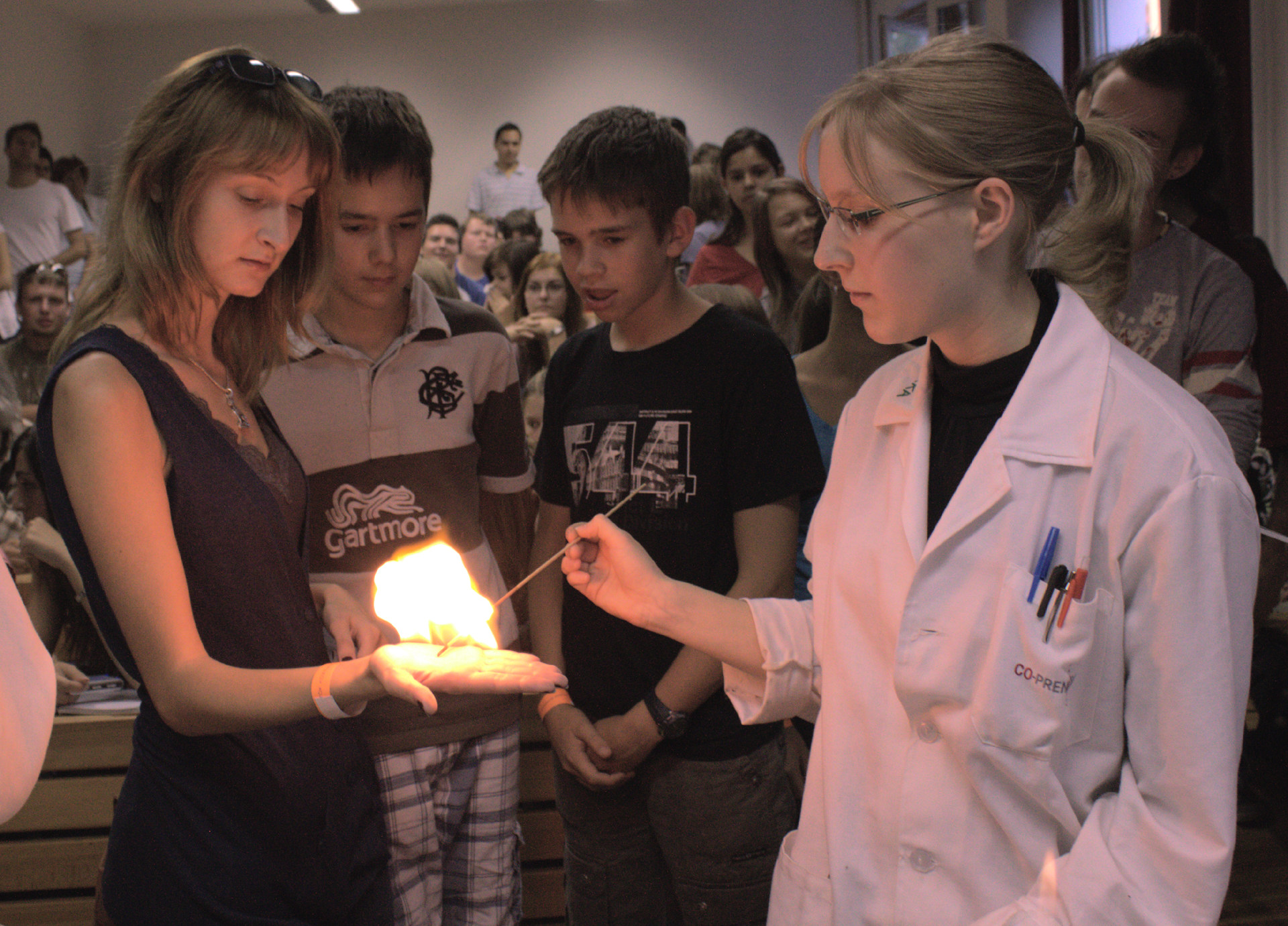
Researchers' Night, at the PTE Faculty of Science, which is part of the Hungarian higher education promotion program

Science education started in Pécs in 1948, at the then independent Teacher Training College. In 1982, the former college became a member of the then Janus Pannonius University of Pécs as the Faculty of Teacher Education, together with the Faculty of Law and the Faculty of Economics. From then on, both natural sciences and humanities began to be developed to university level. As a result, in 1992, the Faculty of Sciences and the Faculty of Humanities were established simultaneously at the university, which had three faculties until then. The renovation of the old Jesuit grammar school complex began in 1991. This resulted in the construction of the Faculty Library and Lecture Hall, which is shared with the Faculty of Humanities. In 1997 the new Sports Centre building was inaugurated, including a gymnasium and a modern swimming pool. The reconstruction of the complex was completed in 1998. This gave all areas of the faculty modern facilities.

The faculty's institutes are: the Institute of Biology, the Institute of Physics, the Institute of Geography and Earth Sciences, the Institute of Chemistry, the Institute of Mathematics and Informatics, the Institute of Sports Science and Physical Education, the centre for Computer Science and Teaching Technology and the Sports Centre. A unique feature in the country is that the University of Pécs offers courses in physical education and sports science. Basic training is provided in 11 fields (biology, physics, geography, earth sciences, chemistry, mathematics, business informatics, environmental sciences, computer programming, sports organisation and physical education - coaching). The faculty offers postgraduate training in four doctoral schools: the Doctoral School of Biology, the Doctoral School of Physics, the Doctoral School of Earth Sciences and the Doctoral School of Chemistry.

=== Medical School ===
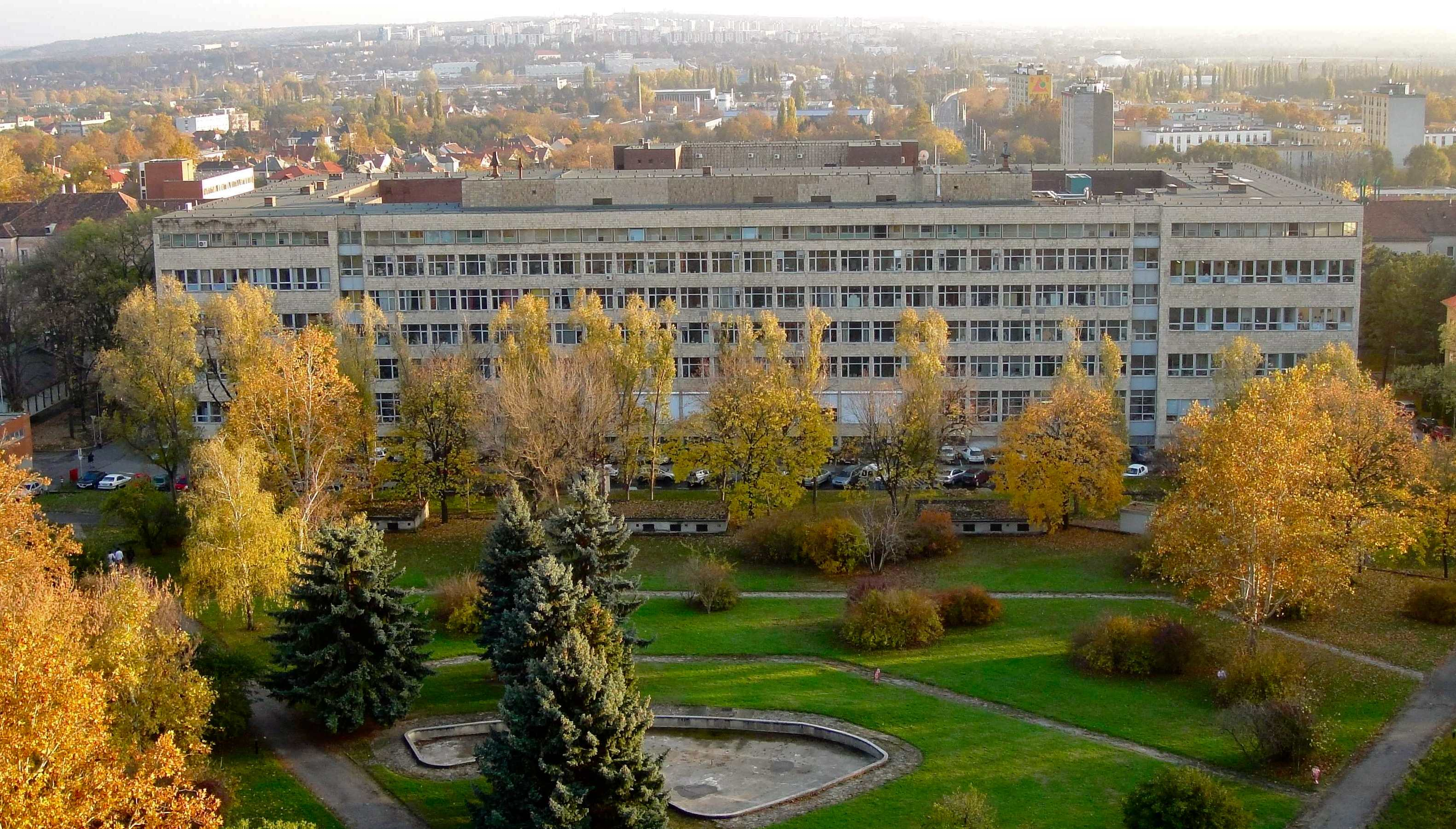
The building of the Medical School

The Medical School of UP is one of only four Medical Schools in Hungary. The University of Pécs established its first English-taught program in 1984 (it was the first in Hungary) and the German program in 2004. The Royal Hungarian Elizabeth University in Bratislava, founded in 1912 by Franz Joseph, was moved to Pécs in 1921 by Act XXV of the Hungarian National Assembly. The Elizabeth University started its operation on 15 October 1923. In 1950, the medical education and the management of the clinics and institutes were transferred from the Ministry of Religion and Public Education to the Ministry of Health. On 1 February 1951, the Medical School separated and continued to operate as an independent university under the supervision of the Ministry of Health under the name of the Medical University of Pécs.

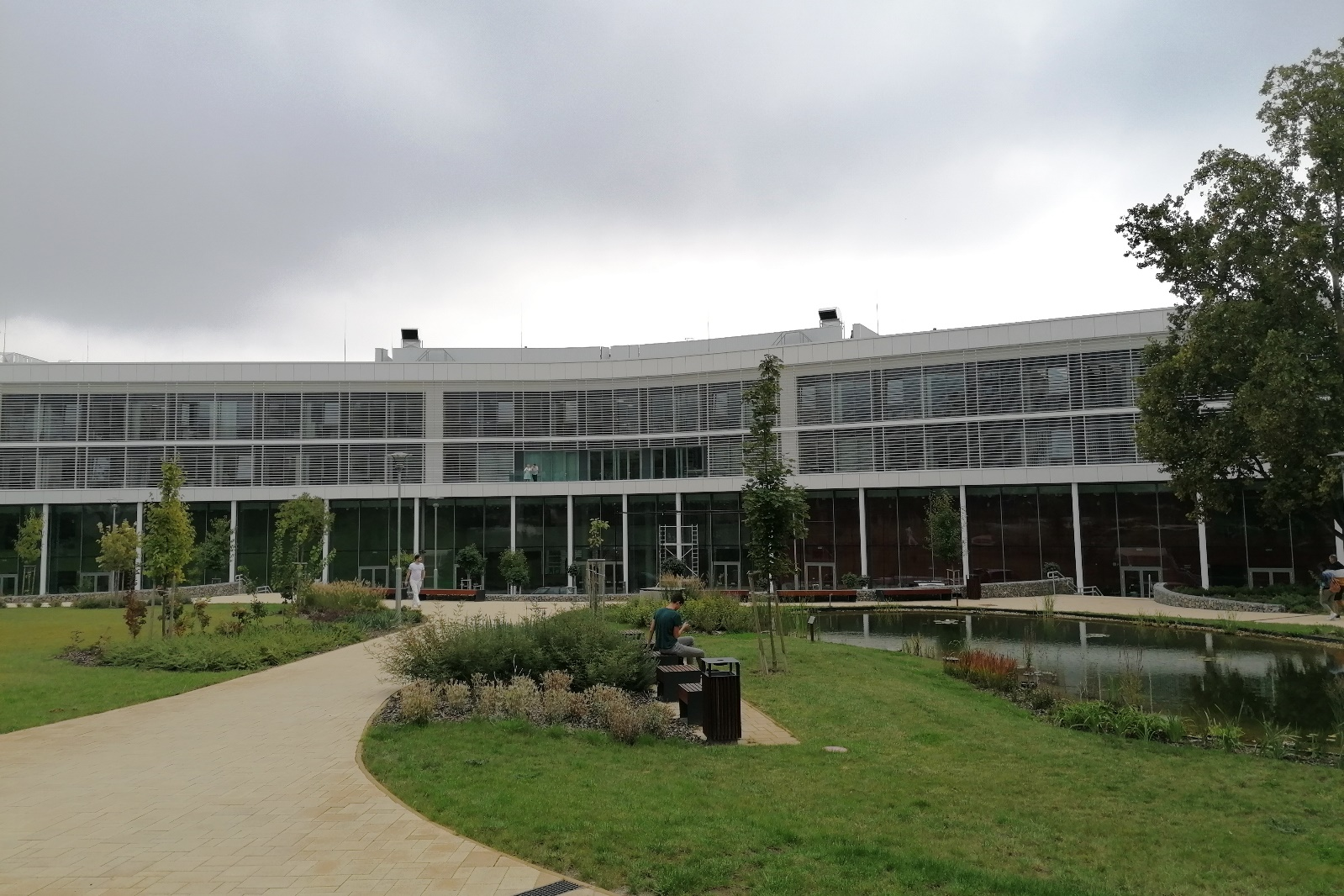
The new theoretical block of the medical school

As of 1 January 2000, in the framework of higher education integration, JPTE and POTE merged under the name of the University of Pécs, thus the independent institution of medical education in Pécs ceased to exist; medical education continued at the Medical School of the University of Pécs (PTE ÁOK). In 2000, the first pharmacist training course was launched with 30 students, which has been operating as an independent faculty since 1 January 2016. The curricula and curricular structure have followed international trends. The English-language training of physicians has been providing world-renowned specialists since 1984. In response to the demand, the faculty started German-language medical training in 2004, English-language training in 2005 and German-language dental training in 2006. Thanks to the good relations between the faculty and the university and the accession to the ECTS system, students of the faculty can join the medical, dental and pharmacy training programmes of national and foreign universities through Erasmus and other international programmes. The training courses involve 29 clinics, 22 theoretical institutes, 9 teaching hospitals and more than 500 doctors, researchers and theoreticians. The faculty library provides access to thousands of publications, prestigious national and international journals and a permanent online database. The university clinics are the highest-quality health care institutions in the city, the county and the South Transdanubian region, offering students the opportunity for practical training. They also serve as a base for scientific development. The renewing campus is 7700 square metres of modern research area.

== Clinical Centers ==
Today, the Clinical Center is also an integral part of the University of Pécs. It is one of the largest healthcare providers in Hungary, whose main activities are education and research in addition to treatment.

The Clinical Center is made up of several smaller units (clinics and institutes):

- No. I Internal Medicine Clinic
- II. s. Internal Medicine Clinic and Center for Nephrology and Diabetology
- Institute of Anesthesiology and Intensive Care
- Skin, Gynecology and Oncodermatology Clinic
- Vascular Surgery Clinic
- Dental and Oral Surgery Clinic
- Center for Occupational Health and Occupational Hygiene
- Otorhinolaryngology and Head and Neck Surgery Clinic
- Pediatric Clinic
- Neurosurgery Clinic
- Institute of Immunology and Biotechnology
- Hospital Hygiene Service
- Institute of Laboratory Medicine
- Neurological Clinic
- Oncotherapy Institute
- Orthopedic Clinic
- Institute of Medical Genetics
- Medical Imaging Clinic
- Institute of Medical Microbiology and Immunology
- Independent Department of Medical Rehabilitation and Physical Medicine
- Institute of Pathology
- Psychiatry and Psychotherapy Clinic
- Rheumatology and Immunology Clinic
- Surgery Clinic
- Department of Emergency Medicine
- Ophthalmology
- Cardiology Clinic
- Obstetrics and Gynecology Clinic
- Traumatology and Hand Surgery Clinic
- Urology Clinic
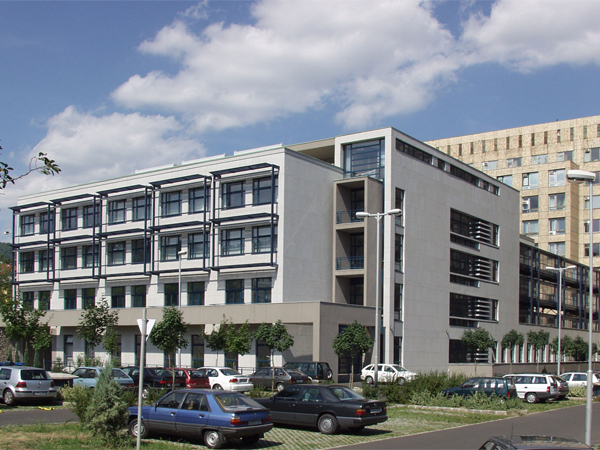
The building of the Cardiology Clinic

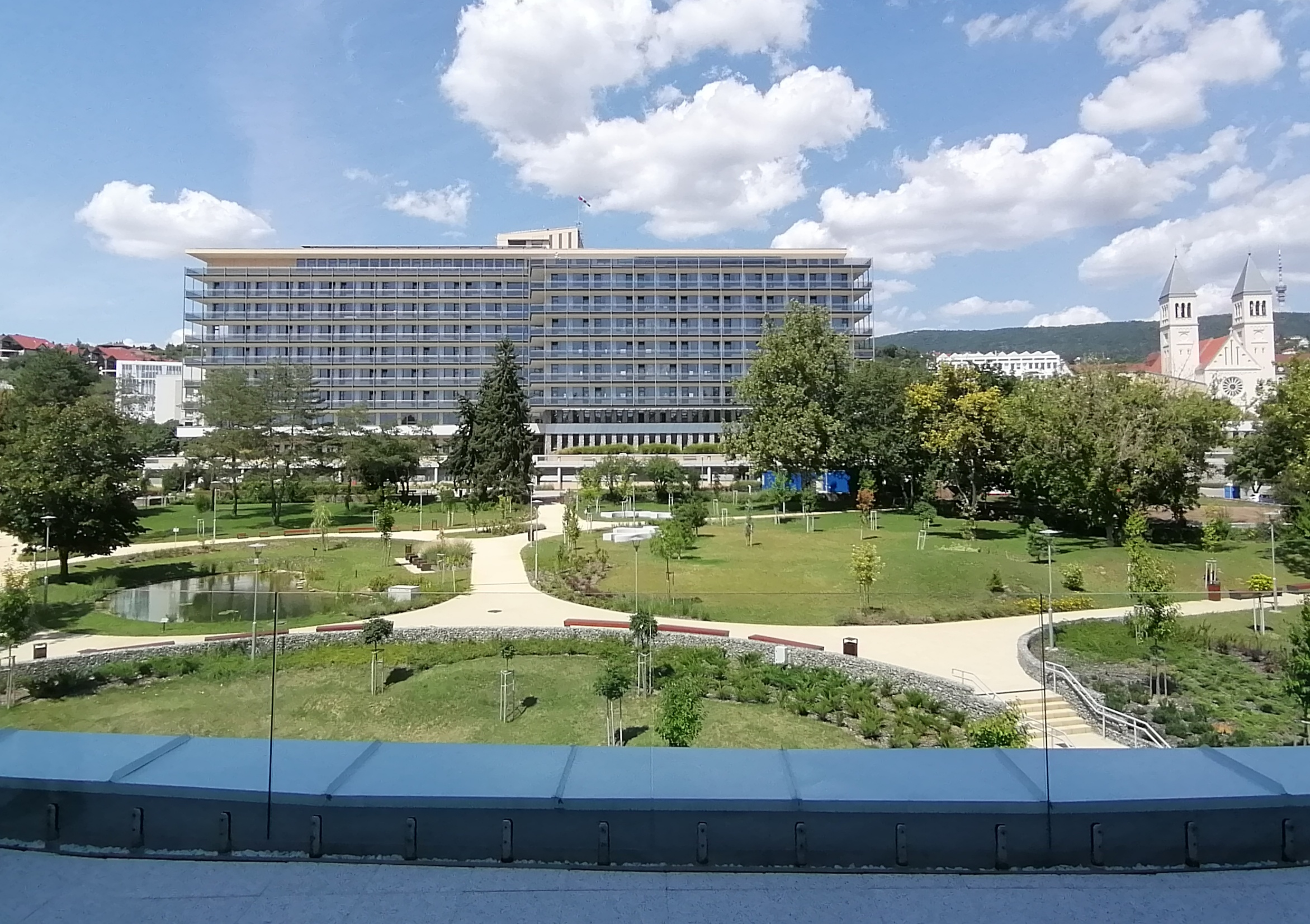
The building of the 400-bed clinic

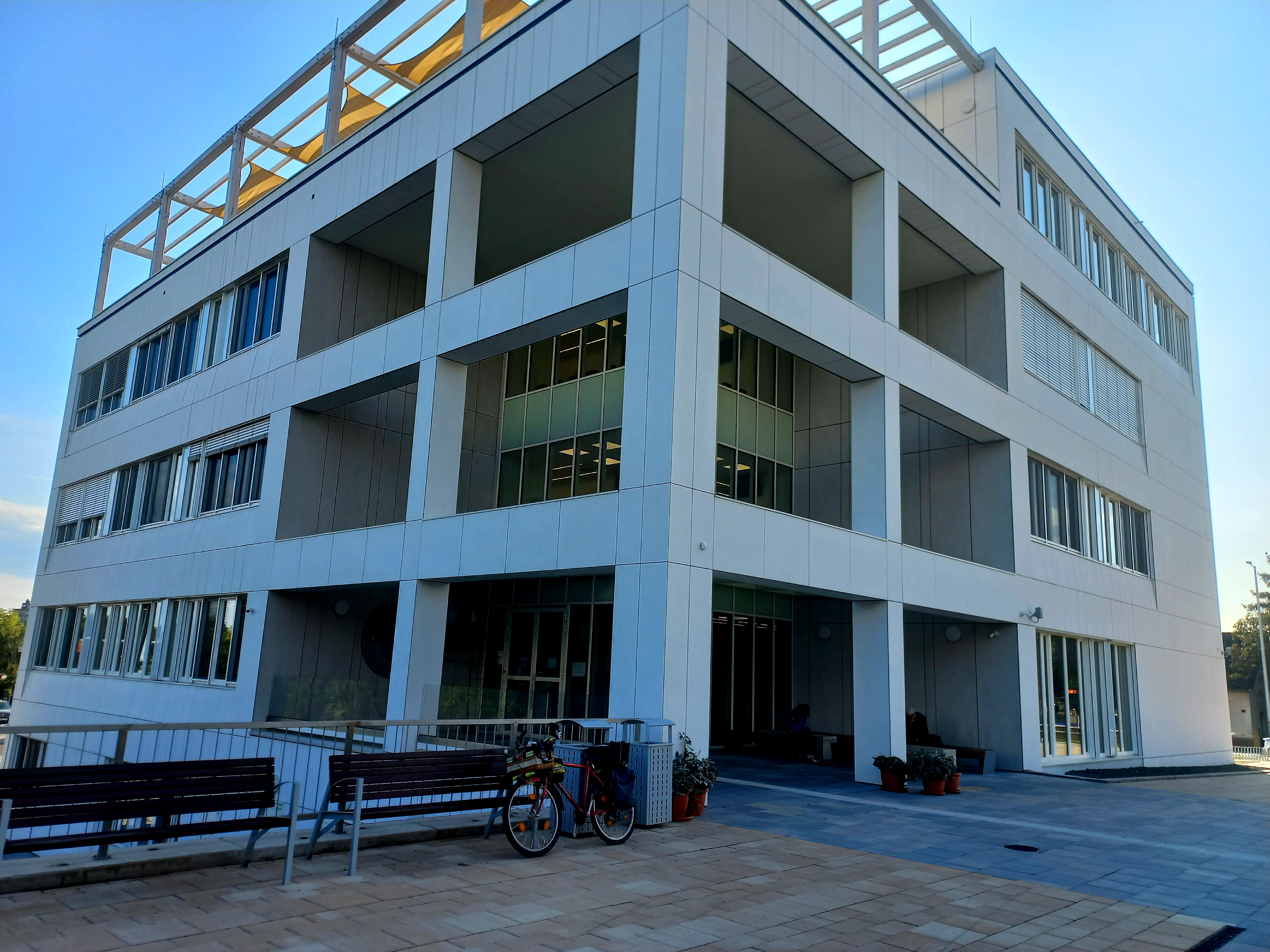
The building of the Dental and Oral Surgery Clinic

== Dormitories ==
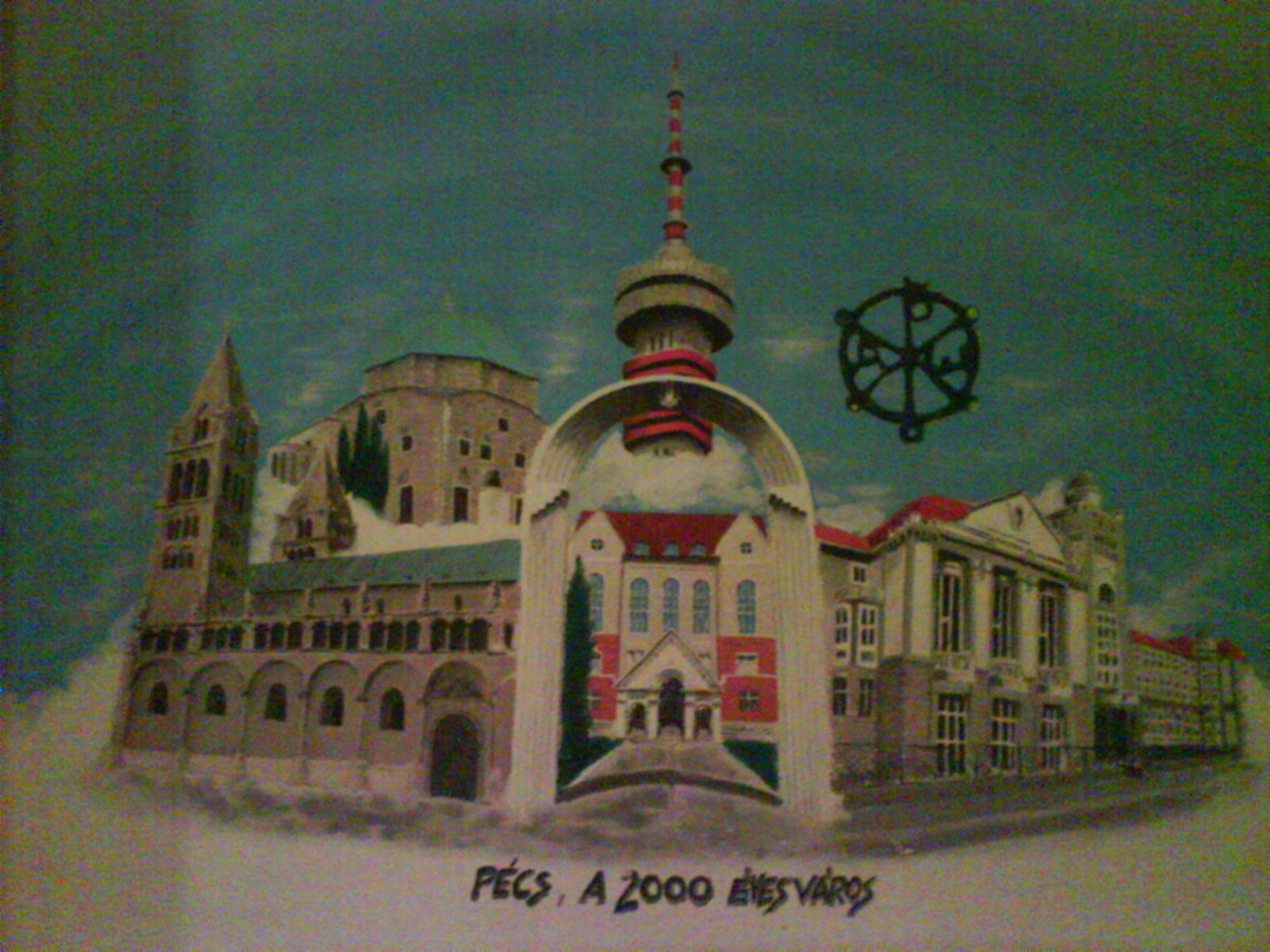
Tibor Rosta's painting on the wall opposite the entrance to the Szántó college.

=== In Pécs ===
- Boszorkány College (7624 Pécs, Boszorkány street 2.)
- Hunyor guest house and student hostel (7624 Pécs, Jurisics Miklós street 16.)
- László Szalay College (Univ) (7622 Pécs, Breuer Marcell pedány 2.)
- Szántó College (7633 Pécs, Szántó Kovács János street 1/d)
- Jakabhegyi College (7635 Pécs, Jakabhegyi street 8.)
- Damjanich College (7624 Pécs, 30 Damjanich street)
- Laterum college (7633 Pécs, Hajnóczy út 37–39.)

=== In other settlements ===
- College of Cultural Studies, Teacher Training and Rural Development Faculty (7100, Szekszárd, Mátyás király street 3.)
- ETK Kaposvár College (7400 Kaposvár, Szent Imre street 14/b)
- ETK Szombathely College (9700 Szombathely, Jókai Mór street 14.)
- ETK Zalaegerszeg College (Zalaegerszeg, Landorhegyi street 23, 33)

== Notable alumni ==
- László Lénárd, neuroscientist, member of the Hungarian Academy of Sciences
- Ferenc Győri, ultramarathon runner, geographer, and university lecturer
- Ferenc Gyurcsány, Prime Minister of Hungary from 2004 to 2009, leader of the Democratic Coalition
- Ante Starčević, Croatian politician and writer, founder of the Party of Rights
- László Sólyom, President of Hungary from 2005 until 2010, president of the Constitutional Court from 1990 to 1998
- Csilla Hegedüs, former Deputy Prime Minister of Romania
- Márta Mátrai, First Officer of the National Assembly of Hungary
- Bertalan Tóth, lawyer and former leader of the Hungarian Socialist Party
- Zsolt Páva, Mayor of Pécs between 2009 and 2019
- Dezső Németh, psychologist and cognitive neuroscientist at INSERM, research team leader in Lyon Neuroscience Research Center (CRNL).
- Norbert Pap, geographer–historian, founder of the Balkan Research Group, as well as leader of the Zrinski-Suleiman Research Group
- Sándor Keresztes, diplomat and jurist, former president of the Christian Democratic People's Party
- György Vókó, criminologist, professor of criminology and criminal law, former director of Hungary's National Institute of Criminology
- György Buzsáki, biologist, brain researcher, professor of neuroscience at New York University School of Medicine
- Anna Rudolf, chess player, chess commentator, livestreamer, and YouTuber who holds the titles of International Master and Woman Grandmaster
- Zoltan Pozsar, economist known for his analysis of shadow banking
- Cecília Müller, physician and Chief Medical Officer of Hungary
- Tamás Kenderesi, competitive swimmer, Olympics and European Championships bronze medalist
- Ibolya Dávid, lawyer, politician, former president of the Hungarian Democratic Forum, former Minister of Justice
- István Bárány, swimmer, four-time European Champion
- Zoltán Mága, violinist
- Sándor Fábry, comedian, talk show host, and writer

== See also ==
- List of medieval universities
- Medieval university
- List of early modern universities in Europe
