= Doctor of Liberal Arts =

Advanced academic degree

The Doctor of Liberal Arts degree (D.L.A.) is a professional artistic doctorate in the field of the Liberal Arts, including architecture, dance, music, theater and visual arts. Like other doctorates, is an academic degree of the highest level.

D.L.A. students of music typically complete applied studies culminating in several solo recitals, take courses within their area of specialization (as well as related courses in music theory and music history), and write a thesis or dissertation.

In the field of the visual arts it is the intention of the program to give young artists the chance to develop into creative individuals, through intensive studio practice, including study of the materials, tools, theory and methodology of the profession. The three-year doctoral program leads to the D.L.A. degree in the fields of painting, sculpture, graphics, graphic design, intermedia, and restoration. The works produced during these studies, and the final master works, are regularly exhibited.

== Universities offering the degree ==
There are several universities in Hungary that grant the degree as Doctor Liberalium Artium:

- Budapest University of Technology and Economics
- Franz Liszt Academy of Music in Budapest
- Hungarian University of Fine Arts
- Moholy-Nagy University of Art and Design
- University of Pécs

The degree is also offered in the United States in continuing studies at Washington University in St. Louis.

=== Honorary ===
Florida Southern College gave Lynne V. Cheney an honorary Doctor of Liberal Arts in 1993. It was also awarded as an honorary degree at Dickinson College.

== See also ==
- Doctor of Letters at Drew University
- Doctor of Musical Arts
