= Ferenc Győri =

Hungarian docent and geographer

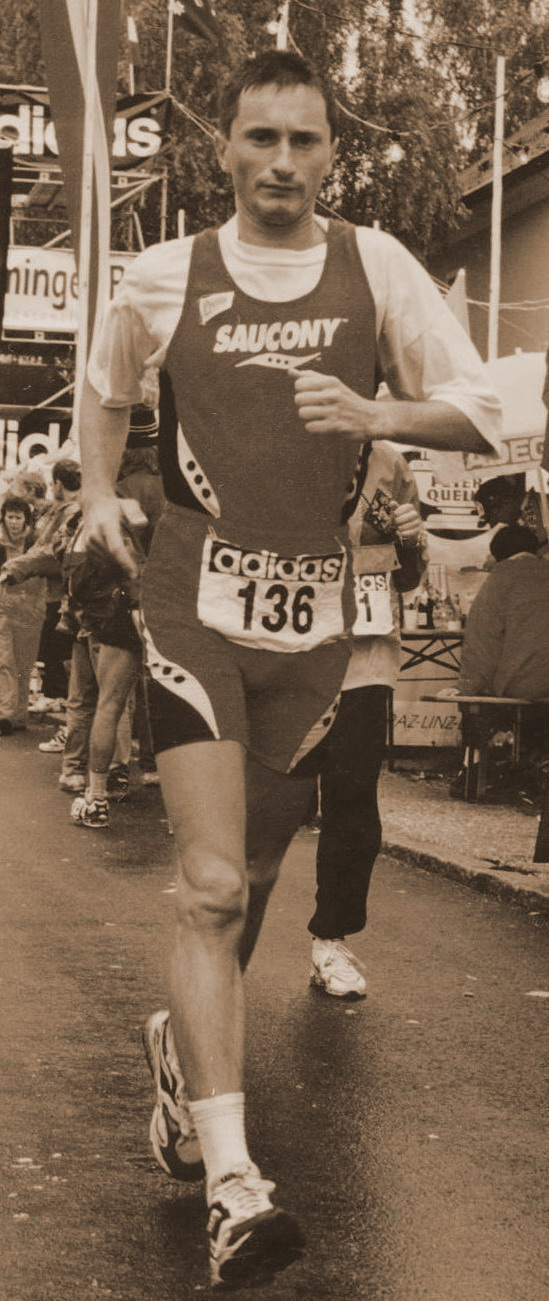

Personal information
- National team: Hungary
- Born: 15 September 1964 (age 61) Kiskunfélegyháza, Hungary

Sport
- Sport: Ultramarathon
Medal record
Gold medal – first place	1996 IAU European 24 hour Championships	Courcon
Gold medal – first place	1996 24-Stundenlauf	Reichenbach
Gold medal – first place	1997 24-Stundenlauf	Wörschach

Ferenc Győri (born September 15, 1964 in Kiskunfélegyháza, Hungary) is a Hungarian ultramarathon runner, geographer, and university lecturer.

== Education ==
He completed his high school education as well as his university studies in Szeged. He earned his bachelor's degree with a double major in Physical Education and Geography from Juhász Gyula Teacher’s Training College in 1988. At the same time, he also became a qualified track and field coach with a degree from the University of Physical Education. He earned his master's degree in Geography from József Attila University in 1991 and defended his PhD thesis at the Doctoral School of Earth Sciences at the University of Pécs in 2010.

== Athletic career ==
As a junior athlete, Ferenc Győri distinguished himself with his strong performances at the half marathon distance (21.0975 kilometers / 13.1094 mi). In 1995 he won grueling 230 km ultramarathon between Nyíregyháza and Budapest.

He has four sub-7 hour 100 km performances under his belt. He also won three international 24-hour races and a 12-hour event. However, his masterpiece is his European championship title earned at the IAU 24 Hour European Championships in Courcon, France in 1996.

== Sports diplomacy ==
Between 1996 and 2002 he worked as a liaison between the International Association of Ultrarunners (IAU) and the Hungarian Athletics Association. In 1998 he became an elected member of the Technical Committee of the IAU.

== Scientific achievements ==
As a student researcher, Ferenc Győr finished 8th at the national competition for high schools and took second and third places with his research papers at university. Between 1992 and 1993 he was the recipient of a government grant.

Between 1988 and 1993 he worked an external scientific fellow at the Békéscsaba base of the Hungarian Academy of Sciences. In 1990 he was the recipient of the Teaching Researcher’s Grant of the Hungarian Academy of Sciences. In 2011 he was promoted associate professor at the University of Szeged Juhász Gyula Faculty of Education.

== Awards ==
- Hungarian Ultrarunners' Hall of Fame (2016)
- Life Achievement Award for Ultrarunning (2010)
- Saint Gellert Silver Medal (2002)
- Commemorative Medal of the Hungarian Athletics Federation (1997)
