= Tamás Harle =

Hungarian journalist (born 1960)

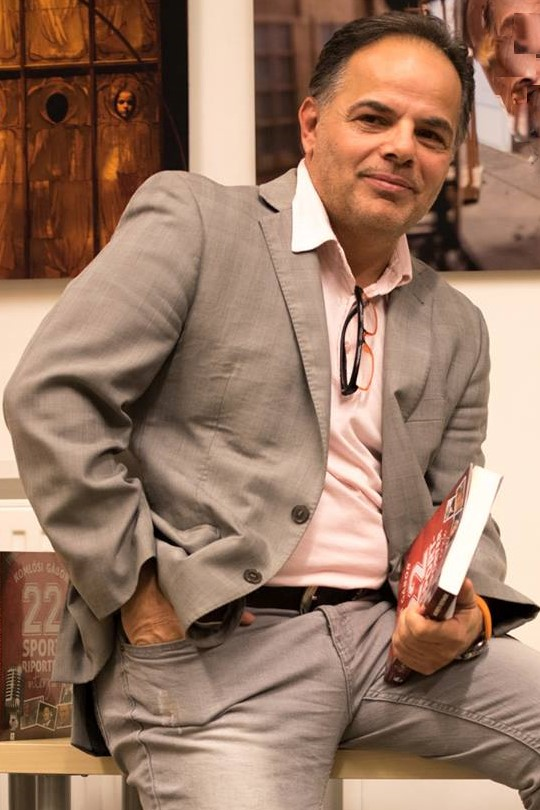
- Harle Tamás fotója
- Born: 1 May 1960 (age 65); Budapest, Hungary
- Title: journalist, author, lecturer in media

Tamás Harle (born 1 May 1960) is a Hungarian journalist, author and media lecturer. As author, editor and publisher he worked on more than 20 books.

== Education ==
After graduating from the Apáczai Csere János Practice School, he earned his bachelor's degree at Kiss Janos University of Primary and Pre-School Education in 1984. During his time at the university, he served six months as a marine on the cargo ship Tata, traveling on the Mediterranean sea. In 2008, Harle earned his master's degree in philosophy at the University of Pecs.

== Career ==
He started his journalism career interning at the editorial office of National Sport. He later became a full-time employee at the newspaper. In 1989, he was co-founder of Hungary's first independent daily newspaper Mai Nap. He founded a publishing company with Laszlo Ladonyi before the Barcelona Olympics in 1992, where he wrote, edited and published sports books.

He began working as a media lecturer in 1992 and was selected Lecturer of the Year in 1994. He started doing research in 1997 on the history and development of journalism genres in the Hungarian press. As a media lecturer, Harle focused on the interconnection of theory and practice, which he demonstrated in the classroom with role playing games and exercises modeling editorial practice. Student feedback played an essential part in the development of his teaching practice and study of genres. In 2012, his book, The Art and Craft of Journalism was published.

His career in Hungarian television started in 1992 when Sziv TV began broadcasting his weekly talk-shows for two and a half years from the Komedium Movie Theatre, and later from Vigado Concert Hall. His guests included prominent personalities of Hungarian cultural and public life. After a study trip to France in 1994, he produced and hosted Candlelit on Hungarian Television.

In 1998 he was commissioned by Axel Springer Hungary to develop the concept for Sunday Morning, a nationwide weekly Sunday newspaper. He continued to be chief-editor of Sunday morning for two years after the launch. He then became a freelance journalist publishing nationwide in papers and magazines such as Free People, World Economy, Sport Plusz, The Observer and Playboy.

== Awards ==
- 2003: Presidential Award: Hungarian Television: Award of Excellence for the concept, realization and editing of the programme One Day – One Word, 67 episodes on MTV (Hungarian Television)
- 1996: Hungarian Olympic Committee: Award of Excellence for editorial work on Barcelona '92 and Atlanta '95 Olympic albums
- 1994: Media Lecturer of the Year at Komlosi Oktatasi Studio (Komlosi Studio for the Education of Riporters, Editors and Journalists)
- 1992: Journalist of the Year – Goldring Award, Mai Nap Inc.
- 1988: Award of Excellence (written press category) – Award for best reporter

== Major works ==
=== Author ===
- The Last 26 Hours – Documentary novel in memory of Csaba Kejsar (1988, 40,000 copies)
- Hungaroheroin (co-author, 1988)
- The Day of Terror – in memory of the 9/11 terror attacks (2011, two editions, 7000 copies)
- The Art and Craft of Journalism (2012, Blue Europe Studio)

=== Author and editor ===
- Wonderful Hungary – A Reader's Digest commission (2005, two editions, 65,000 copies)
- Sydney 2000 – Book of the XXVII. Summer Olympic Games (2000, 15,000 copies)
- Atlanta '92 – Book of the XXVI. Summer Olympic Games (1992, 15,000 copies; co-editors: Laszlo Ladonyi and Tamas Szekeres)
- Barcelona '92 / Book of XXV. Summer Olympic Games (1996, 25,000 copies; co-editor: Laszlo Ladonyi)
- Yearbook of Hungarian Sport 1993 (1993, 15,000 copies; co-editor: Laszlo Ladonyi)
- Earth '92/93 – Everydays of a Curious Planet (1992, 15,000 copies)
- Yearbook of Hungarian Sport 1992 (1992, 15,000 copies; co-editor: Laszlo Ladonyi)

=== Publisher ===
- Gabor Lantos: 100 Days in the North (2012)
- Metrorology – in collaboration with Australian publishing company Weldon Owen (2004)
- Starry Skyscape – in collaboration with Australian publishing company Weldon Owen (2005)
- Agnes Agai: I Only Tell Secrets to My Fingers (1992)
- Eva Vermes: Love-letter-writer (1995)
- Katalin Toth: Rali (1994)
- Fradi Football Century I (1994)
- Fradi Football Century II (1995)
- Zoltan Marczinka: Handball (1994)
- Zoltan Marczinka: Playing Handball – in collaboration with the European Handball Federation (1993)
- 600 Football Training Games (1993)
- Tamas Denes: Brazilian Football-samba (1994)
- Tamas Denes: Milan (1993)
- György Volly: Krisztina Egerszegi (1992)

=== Host and producer ===
- Kurir Talkshow, later Harle Talkshow (1992–1994, 154 episodes)
- Candlelit Interview Show (MTV, 1996–97)
- One Day – One Word (MTV, 2003–2004, 67 episodes)
