= Zoltan Pozsar =

Hungarian-American economist

- Education: University of Pécs
- Occupation: Economist
- Years active: 2003-Present

Zoltan Pozsar is a Hungarian-American economist specializing in the study of the financial system, money markets, and shadow banking. He has worked at international financial institutions and in the private sector, where he has become known for his analyses of the architecture of the global financial system and the role of non-bank intermediaries in providing liquidity.

Pozsar has produced influential research on the functioning of short-term funding markets, particularly regarding liquidity crises and the interactions among central banks, commercial banks, and shadow banking entities. His professional career includes positions at the International Monetary Fund, the Federal Reserve Bank of New York, and the investment firm Credit Suisse, where he served as Managing Director in the strategy for rates and credit. In 2023, he founded Ex Uno Capital, an independent macroeconomic advisory firm.

== Early life and education ==
Zoltan Pozsar was born in Hungary. He graduated from the University of Pécs and received an MBA from KDI School of Public Policy and Management.

== Career ==
In 2003, on a recommendation from KDI professor David J. Behling, Pozsar was hired by Mark Zandi of Moody's economy.com as an associate economist, initially charged with covering the recreational goods industry. In January 2006, Pozsar — along with two Moody's colleagues — predicted forecasts for trade gap, industrial production, durable goods orders and personal incomes that were the most accurate of any among major Wall Street analysts that month, earning the trio the MarketWatch Forecaster of the Month award.

He subsequently went to work at the Federal Reserve Bank of New York where he led market intelligence for securitized credit markets.

From 2011 to 2012, Pozsar was a visiting scholar at the International Monetary Fund and, from 2012 to 2015, a senior advisor with the U.S. Department of the Treasury.

In 2015, he left the U.S. Treasury department to join Credit Suisse as a director, and was later promoted to a managing director responsible for the bank's short-term interest rate strategy. At Credit Suisse, Pozsar correctly predicted a major shift in U.S. repurchase agreement markets that occurred in 2019.

He left Credit Suisse in May 2023. The following month, he announced the launch of his own advisory firm called Ex Uno Plures, a reversal of the Latin phrase 'e pluribus unum' that means 'out of one, many,' where he would offer clients insight into the dollar system.

=== Writing and influence ===
Pozsar is an influential taxonomist of shadow banking, described by Reuters as a "markets guru", and lauded by Adam Tooze as the Jules Verne of financial forecasting due to what Tooze calls his “brilliant and intellectually fertile” writing. In 2022, the Financial Times wrote that Pozsar was the only financier with his own hashtag on social media and that whenever Pozsar "publishes research, the financial corners of Twitter will light up with comments on the latest from #Zoltan". According to the Wall Street Journal, Wall Street insiders trade copies of Pozsar's writing "like music fans swapping bootlegs".

==== Selected works ====
- Pozsar, Zoltan (2014). Shadow Banking: The Money View. Office of Financial Research, U.S. Department of the Treasury.
- Pozsar, Zoltan (2011). Institutional Cash Pools and the Triffin Dilemma of the U.S. Banking System. International Monetary Fund.
- Pozsar, Zoltan; Tobias, Adrian; Ashcraft, Adam; Boesky, Hayley (2010). Shadow Banking. Federal Reserve Bank of New York.

== Personal life ==
Pozsar is fluent in English, German, and Hungarian.
