= Herle (surname) =

Herle is an English surname. Notable people with the name include:

- Charles Herle (1598–1659), English theologian
- Christoph Herle (born 1955), German athlete
- David Herle, Canadian political consultant
- Edward Herle (1617–1695), English politician
- Robert de Herle, 14th-century English military commander
- Thomas Herle (1622 – c. 1681), English politician
- Wilhelm of Herle (fl. 1358–1370), Dutch painter
- William Herle (1270–1347), British justice
- William Herle (spy) (fl. 1571–1588), pirate and spy
