= Research group =

Multiple associated researchers

A research group is a group of researchers often from the same faculty, specialized on the same subject, working together on the issue or topic.

The success of a research group depends on several factors: clearly defined goals, research emphasis, group climate, participative governance, decentralized organization, communication, resources, recruitment, selection, and leadership.

Research groups may be mistaken for study groups, which tend to be more casual and more frequently used by younger students.
