= Ferenc Tóth (politician) =

Hungarian politician (1950–2020)

Member of the National Assembly
- In office 18 June 1998 – 5 May 2014

Personal details
- Born: 30 December 1950 Fadd, Tolna County, Hungary
- Died: 4 December 2020 (aged 69)
- Party: Fidesz
- Profession: engineer, politician

Ferenc Tóth ([ˈfɛrɛnts ˈtoːt]; 30 December 1950 – 4 December 2020) was a Hungarian engineer and politician.

He was a member of the National Assembly (MP) for Paks (Tolna County Constituency II) between 1998 and 2014.

== Early life and career ==
Ferenc Tóth was born in Fadd, Hungary, on 30 December 1950, and graduated from Földvári Mihály General Secondary School in Tolna in 1969. He graduated as a maintenance engineer from the College Faculty of the Technical University for Heavy Industry of Dunaújváros in 1974. Tóth qualified as a secondary school teacher in Dunaújváros in 1976 and conducted academic studies as a specialist economist at the University of Pécs until 1993.

Tóth worked as a maintenance engineer for the Lenin Agricultural Co-operative in Fadd from 1974, then from 1981 as a teacher in the children's home in Fadd. He was a physicist of the radiation protection department of the Tolna County Public Health and Sanitation Station from 1988 to 1990. Tóth was an individual entrepreneur from 1994 to 1995, and became director of sales of Mészkő és Dolomit Rt. (Limestone & Dolomite Co. Ltd.) in 1996. He was acting managing director of the Tolna County Enterprise Promotion Fund from February 1999. Tóth pursued handball competitively for several years and was a member of the Hungarian Olympic Committee (MOB) from 1998 to 2001.

== Political career ==
Tóth ran as an independent candidate in the 1990 local elections and was elected mayor of his birthplace, serving for four years. He secured a seat in Parliament in the 1998 parliamentary election running as a non-party candidate supported by Fidesz, representing Paks (Constituency II, Tolna County). He was elected a local representative of Fadd again in the 1998 local elections running as an independent candidate.

In the national election on 21 April 2002, Tóth retained his seat in Parliament running as an individual candidate. From the middle of May 2002, he continued his work as a member of the Education and Science Committee. In the local elections held in 2002, Tóth was elected a local representative. He was elected president of the local branch of Fidesz in 2003. In the parliamentary election held in 2006 and 2010, he was elected MP for Paks again. He became a member of the Committee on Education and Science on 30 May 2006 and was appointed Director of Government Office of Tolna County on 1 January 2011. He served in this capacity until 30 June 2014, when he was replaced by Kálmán Horváth.

== Personal life and death ==
Ferenc Tóth was married to Erzsébet Deák, a high school teacher with a degree in chemistry and physics. They had two children, Ferenc who is a veterinarian and András, who is a humanist. Ferenc Tóth Sr. was awarded the officer's cross of the Hungarian Order of Merit in 2019. In retirement he intended to read Russian classic literature and continue his hobbies in sport and music.

He died from COVID-19 on 4 December 2020, during the COVID-19 pandemic in Hungary, twenty six days short from his 70th birthday.
