= Fadd =

Fadd may refer to:

- Fadd, Hungary, a village in Hungary
- FADD, a receptor mediating cellular apoptosis
