= COVID-19 pandemic in Hungary =

Ongoing COVID-19 viral pandemic in Hungary

- Disease: COVID-19
- Pathogen: SARS-CoV-2
- Location: Hungary
- First outbreak: Wuhan, Hubei, China
- Index case: Budapest
- Arrival date: 4 March 2020 (6 years, 7 months and 24 days)
- Confirmed cases: 2,203,171
- Hospitalized cases: 31
- Ventilator cases: 2
- Recovered: 2,152,155
- Deaths: 48,881
- Fatality rate: 2.91%

Government website
- koronavirus.gov.hu

The COVID-19 pandemic in Hungary was a part of the worldwide pandemic of coronavirus disease 2019 (COVID-19) caused by severe acute respiratory syndrome coronavirus 2 (SARS-CoV-2). On 4 March 2020, the first cases in Hungary were announced. The first coronavirus-related death was announced on 15 March on the government's official website.

On 18 March 2020, Surgeon general Cecília Müller announced that the virus had spread to every part of the country. As of June 2021, Hungary had the second-highest COVID-19 death rate in the world.

As of 19 March 2023, a total of 16,568,528 vaccine doses had been administered.

== Background ==
The Hungarian Operational Task Force was formed on 31 January 2020, led by Sándor Pintér, Interior Minister and Miklós Kásler, Minister of Human Resources, and included:

- Surgeon General Cecília Müller,
- Károly Papp, Director of Security Department of Interior Ministry,
- János Balogh, Chief of National Police, and the directors of National High Directorate of Disaster Management, Anti-Terrorism Centre, Central Hospital of South Pest, National Healthcare Supplying Service and National Ambulance.
- Zoltán Jenei, Director of the National Healthcare Service Centre

Staff immediately announced its plan for security against the spread of virus. After detecting the virus in the country, they announced that operational staff would hold daily meetings at noon.

On 1 February, the spokesperson of National Command of Penalty Execution (BVOP) announced that prisoners of Debrecen and Sátoraljaújhely had started the production of sanitary masks. They produce 20 000 masks daily in a 12-hour shift, which are stored in different repositories all around the country, and continually delivered to general practitioners.

At the beginning of the pandemic, the virus was concentrated in and around Wuhan. Seven Hungarians living in Wuhan, who wanted to move back to Europe, were transported through France and placed in quarantine for two weeks. They remained healthy during those two weeks and were released on 16 February.

Due to the events and news connected to the outbreak of the novel coronavirus, in February 2020, several goods—such as antiseptic arm cleaning materials, masks and non-perishable food – were in short supply in a lot of shops in Hungary. Tamás Schanda, strategical and political under-secretary of Innovation and the Science Ministry said "The Government understands the concerns of the people, but experts say it is unnecessary and pointless to hoard non-perishable food." The accumulation of goods declined quite quickly, and the detection of the virus in March did not cause measurable problems in shops.

The Government of Hungary launched its official webpage and official Facebook page about the novel coronavirus, both on 4 March 2020.

== Timeline ==
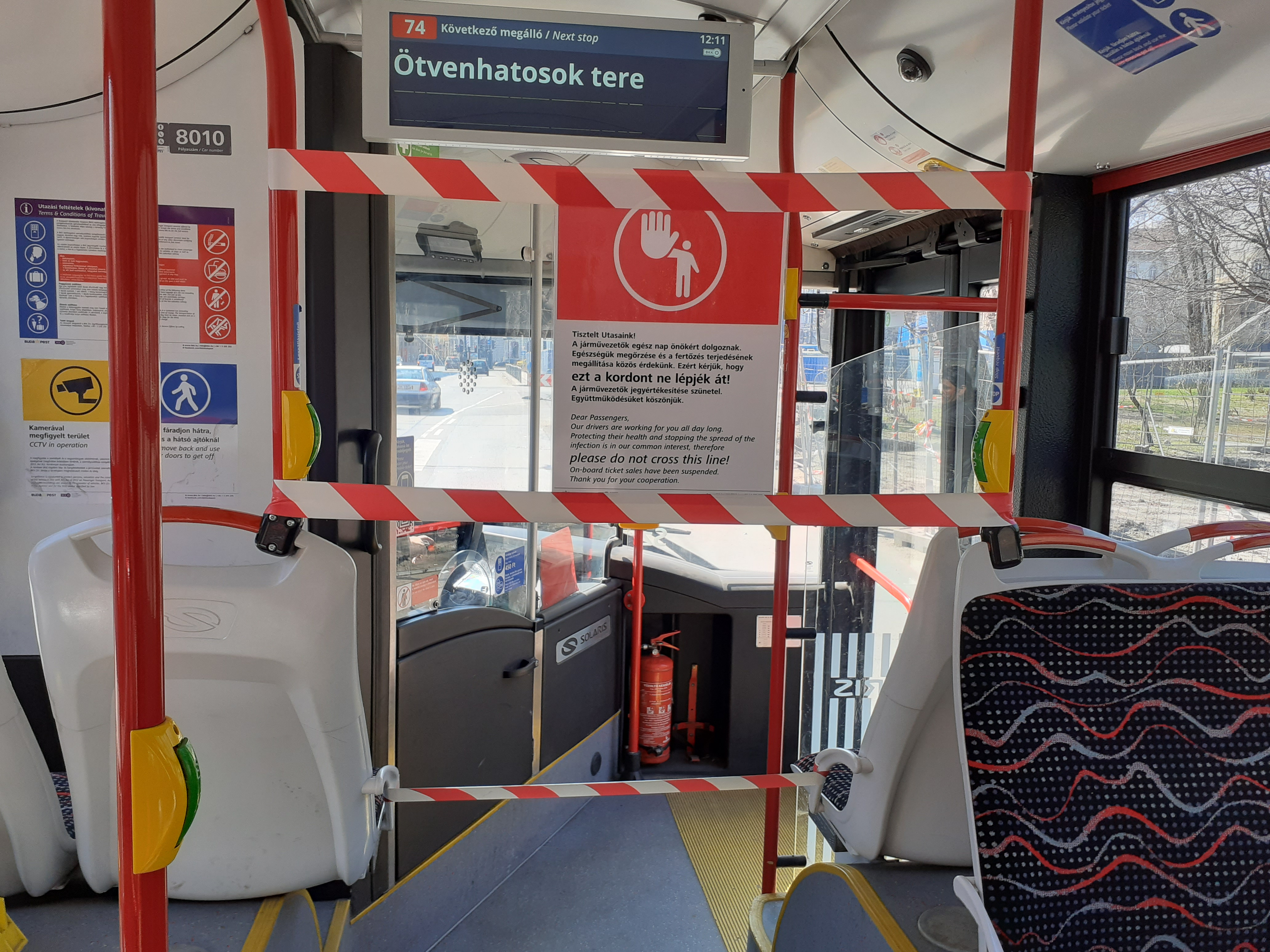
COVID-19 viral pandemic in Hungary

Confirmed cases in Hungary	2,203,171
Active cases in Hungary	1,961
Number of recoveries	2,152,155
Number of deaths	48,881
Number of home quarantined	
Number of PCR samples	
Number of partially vaccinated	6,422,467
Number of fully vaccinated (triple)	3,905,434
Last update: 28 Jun 2023 9:17 CEST

The first two known cases were students from Iran, who were studying in Hungary. One of them was enrolled at the Pharmacy Faculty of Semmelweis University. The student did not comply with the preventive measures required by the university as a precaution. He already visited his primary care physician and he was diagnosed with bacterial infection so that he did not have to quarantine himself, and instead, he attended courses held in English with 16 other students. The other person studied at the Hungarian University of Agriculture and Life Sciences in Gödöllő, who after returning from Iran, went to a self-declared quarantine. He did not attend lectures at the university, but went to Saint Ladislaus Hospital, and declared that he had arrived from an infected territory.

Both of them were transported to Saint Ladislaus Hospital. They had mild symptoms. They arrived back in Hungary on 26 and 28 February 2020.

A third infection was announced on 5 March 2020. He was a 69-year-old British man who was working in Milan and travelled frequently between Milan and Debrecen. He developed a fever, so he visited his doctor. He was diagnosed and transported to Gyula Kenézy Hospital. Shortly after, the fourth infected had been announced. She was a girlfriend of one of the Iranian students that were first diagnosed. She was proactively isolated when the virus was diagnosed in the Iranians.

The fifth infected was identified on 7 March 2020, a 70-year-old man, who may have been infected by his son. The son previously visited some other countries, such as Italy.

The sixth and seventh infected persons were announced on 8 March 2020. They were exposed to the earlier diagnosed five infected persons. One of them was a friend of one of the Iranian students who was participating in a birthday party. The other was the Hungarian wife of the British man in Debrecen. The next day, two other people were found to be infected, and, like the previous day, one of the infected had also come in contact with the first infected Iranian student. The other one was the wife of the elder man who had been isolated. On 10 March 2020, three new cases were discovered with students related to the first infected Iranian student, so they had remained under quarantine. A day later, a Hungarian woman was announced as the 13th infected. She had come into contact with the first person isolated in Debrecen. Due to this she was hospitalised for several days.

The first death which may have been due to the coronavirus occurred on 11 March 2020. A 99-year-old woman was in hospital, where she was operated on at Saint Imre Hospital. After the successful operation, she had fever and pneumonia. Her daughter – who visited her regularly – got pneumonia the same day. Later, the daughter was diagnosed with COVID-19. Her mother was never tested and so not registered in connection with coronavirus.

Three new cases were reported on 12 March 2020. One was a student from Iran (a contact of the first case) whilst the other two were Hungarian citizens. One of the two Hungarians was a woman who had been in Saint Ladislaus Hospital for several days, the other one was a man travelling from Israel. On 12 March 2020, János Szlávik, head of Infectological Department of South Pest Centre Hospital, confirmed that an Iranian citizen, held in quarantine, had recovered. All of his test results were negative.

On 13 March 2020, the number of known cases increased by 3, all of whom were Hungarian citizens. One of them, a 67-year-old man, had met several people from abroad in connection with his work. One other was a 41-year-old man, who had recently been in the Netherlands and England. The third one was a 27-year-old man, who had travelled to Israel with one of the already known infected people.

On 14 March 2020, 11 new people were diagnosed with COVID-19, bringing the total to 30; 6 were announced in the morning and 5 in the evening. All of the new cases were Hungarian citizens. The newly diagnosed patients include people who had been to Italy, and a person whose family member had returned from Austria.

On 15 March 2020, 2 more people had been diagnosed with COVID-19, for a total of 32. Both of these cases were Hungarian citizens.

On the same day, Sándor Szaniszló, the Mayor of Pestszentlőrinc-Pestszentimre announced the death of a patient at St Ladislaus Hospital who had been diagnosed with coronavirus. He is the first official death of the pandemic in Hungary. He was a 75 years-old man who had died due to infection with SARS-CoV-2 coronavirus and the COVID-19 sickness.

A second recovered patient had left the hospital on 16 March 2020, who was from Iran.

On 18 March 2020, 47 out of the 58 confirmed infected people were Hungarian, 9 Iranian, 1 British, and 1 Kazakh citizen.

On 19 March 2020, there were 9 Iranian, 1 British, 1 Kazakh, and 62 Hungarian infected; all together there were 73 cases. Six were in critical condition, and were in the Intensive Department of South Pest Centre Hospital.

On 20 March 2020, there were 85 confirmed infected people: 10 Iranian, 1 British, 1 Kazakh, and 73 Hungarian citizens. Six of them were in critical condition, whilst 7 had recovered. On this day, three men, a 79, a 68 and a 53-year-old, had died of the 85 infected; the latter had multiple chronic diseases as well.

On 21 March 2020, the number of confirmed cases was 103: 10 Iranian, 2 British, 1 Kazakh, 1 Vietnamese, and 89 Hungarian citizens.

On 22 March 2020, the number of confirmed cases was 131: 10 Iranian, 2 British, 1 Kazakh, 1 Vietnamese, and 117 Hungarian citizens.

The number of infections reported from 26 November 2020 contains cases identified by quick tests conducted in mobile testing stations, ambulances, and among healthcare workers as well. The number of newly tested samples for 26 November contains both PCR tests and quick tests.

=== Graph charts ===
View source data.
View source data.
View source data.
View source data.
View source data.
View source data.
View source data.
View source data.
View source data.
View source data.

=== Infections by county ===
2019–20 Infections (cumulative) by County
Date	Bács-Kiskun	Baranya	Békés	Borsod-Abaúj-Zemplén	Csongrád-Csanád	Fejér	Győr-Moson-Sopron	Hajdú-Bihar	Heves	Jász-Nagykun-Szolnok	Komárom-Esztergom	Nógrád	Pest	Somogy	Szabolcs-Szatmár-Bereg	Tolna	Vas	Veszprém	Zala	Budapest	all	Hospitalized	Ventilated
Date			középre	középre	középre	középre	középre	középre	középre	középre	középre	középre	középre	középre	középre	középre	középre	középre	középre	középre	középre		
2020.03.31.	8	20	3	6	17	12	25	8	2	4	12	5	89	11	24	7	8	10	6	215	492		
2020.04.01.	8	19	3	6	17	13	26	9	3	5	12	5	98	11	25	7	9	10	7	232	525		
2020.04.02.	15	19	3	6	21	18	28	10	3	7	13	6	122	11	27	7	9	10	7	243	585		
2020.04.03.	17	21	4	6	23	21	28	11	3	8	15	7	124	12	28	7	9	10	8	261	623		
2020.04.04.	18	21	6	6	25	21	33	13	3	7	14	8	134	12	28	7	11	10	10	291	678		
2020.04.05.	19	23	8	7	30	24	34	14	3	8	14	10	142	15	28	10	11	10	10	313	733		
2020.04.06.	19	23	8	7	32	24	34	15	4	8	14	10	142	15	28	12	11	10	11	317	744		
2020.04.07.	19	23	9	7	32	39	36	15	4	10	15	11	153	16	34	13	12	13	11	345	817		
2020.04.08.	19	23	10	7	40	49	37	15	4	10	15	12	164	17	36	13	12	14	11	387	895		
2020.04.09.	19	23	11	10	40	55	37	15	4	11	17	12	183	17	36	13	12	18	19	428	980		
2020.04.10.	21	28	11	10	42	72	43	17	5	12	17	12	194	17	37	13	13	23	23	580	1190		
2020.04.11.	22	29	11	13	44	82	44	17	8	13	20	17	199	18	37	13	14	28	26	655	1310		
2020.04.12.	22	29	11	44	45	93	60	18	9	14	20	18	215	20	38	13	14	30	28	669	1410		
2020.04.13.	22	29	11	45	47	102	61	18	9	14	20	19	214	20	38	13	14	31	28	703	1458		
2020.04.14.	22	29	12	45	51	106	61	19	11	15	20	19	220	21	40	13	14	32	30	732	1512		
2020.04.15.	22	29	12	48	52	114	61	19	12	15	20	19	234	21	41	13	14	32	31	770	1579		
2020.04.16.	22	32	12	50	52	122	62	19	13	16	21	19	249	21	42	14	14	34	33	805	1652	729	60
2020.04.17.	22	33	12	52	54	128	63	19	13	17	23	20	259	21	43	14	14	36	37	883	1763	847	63
2020.04.18.	23	33	13	52	55	141	63	19	13	18	25	20	264	21	43	14	14	37	37	929	1834	829	60
2020.04.19.	23	33	13	52	57	146	63	19	13	19	32	22	278	23	43	14	14	41	40	971	1916	784	61
2020.04.20.	23	33	13	53	57	159	64	19	13	19	43	22	286	24	43	14	14	43	40	1002	1984	811	60
2020.04.21.	23	34	13	53	57	175	64	21	14	19	48	23	293	24	44	14	14	43	40	1082	2098	842	82
2020.04.22.	23	35	13	53	57	181	75	22	14	19	48	23	305	24	43	15	15	48	42	1113	2168	825	63
2020.04.23.	23	33	13	53	57	213	72	21	14	19	64	23	317	24	43	16	14	50	42	1173	2284	850	61
2020.04.24.	23	33	13	54	60	240	74	22	15	20	67	23	329	24	43	16	14	50	42	1221	2383	877	61
2020.04.25.	23	33	13	59	63	246	74	23	16	20	70	23	339	24	44	16	14	52	44	1247	2443	899	54
2020.04.26.	23	33	13	62	63	251	75	23	16	21	72	23	350	24	45	16	14	54	48	1274	2500	927	56
2020.04.27.	23	33	14	62	86	263	76	23	16	21	87	23	352	24	45	16	14	54	65	1286	2583	931	52
2020.04.28.	23	33	14	62	89	265	77	23	17	22	92	23	358	24	47	16	14	56	89	1305	2649	976	49
2020.04.29.	23	34	14	63	96	269	77	23	17	22	93	24	368	25	47	17	14	56	98	1347	2727	983	50
2020.04.30.	23	34	15	63	97	271	77	23	17	22	101	24	375	26	47	17	14	58	103	1368	2775	998	54
2020.05.01.	23	34	16	64	97	296	78	23	17	22	110	24	380	27	47	17	14	58	108	1408	2863	983	49
2020.05.02.	23	35	16	65	98	298	79	23	17	22	121	24	394	28	47	17	14	58	115	1448	2942	1008	52
2020.05.03.	23	36	16	65	101	300	79	23	17	22	132	24	400	28	47	17	14	58	123	1473	2998	1005	51
2020.05.04.	23	36	16	65	101	304	79	23	17	22	137	24	401	28	47	17	14	58	139	1484	3035	1027	55
2020.05.05.	23	36	17	65	101	306	81	23	17	23	141	24	402	28	47	17	14	58	139	1503	3065	982	55
2020.05.06.	23	36	17	65	101	310	81	23	17	23	148	25	410	28	47	17	14	58	140	1528	3111	964	50
2020.05.07.	23	36	17	65	102	312	81	23	17	23	157	25	414	28	47	17	14	58	147	1544	3150	968	50
2020.05.08.	23	36	17	65	105	312	82	23	17	23	162	25	420	28	47	17	14	59	151	1552	3178	891	74
2020.05.09.	23	36	17	63	106	317	82	23	16	23	166	25	424	28	47	17	14	60	164	1562	3213	873	
2020.05.10.	23	36	17	63	106	333	83	23	16	23	168	25	434	28	47	17	14	60	168	1579	3263	812	50
2020.05.11.	23	36	17	64	107	333	83	23	16	23	173	25	438	28	47	17	14	60	170	1587	3284	782	42
2020.05.12.	23	36	16	64	108	338	83	23	17	23	174	25	445	28	47	17	14	62	175	1595	3313	746	45
2020.05.13.	23	36	11	64	113	338	83	23	17	23	176	25	456	28	47	17	14	62	176	1609	3341	688	45
2020.05.14.	23	36	11	64	114	339	83	23	17	23	180	25	459	28	47	17	16	62	194	1619	3380	658	49
2020.05.15.	23	36	11	64	114	340	83	23	17	24	183	25	460	28	48	17	16	63	206	1636	3417	614	46
2020.05.16.	24	36	11	64	114	355	83	23	17	24	184	25	467	28	48	17	17	63	218	1655	3473	570	45
2020.05.17.	24	36	11	64	114	356	83	23	17	24	195	25	473	28	48	17	17	63	219	1672	3509	562	47
2020.05.18.	24	36	11	64	114	359	84	23	17	25	198	25	476	28	49	17	17	63	224	1681	3535	568	46
2020.05.19.	24	36	11	64	114	359	84	23	17	25	199	25	486	28	49	17	17	63	226	1689	3556		
2020.05.20.	24	36	11	64	114	361	84	23	13	25	206	26	496	28	49	17	17	63	231	1710	3598	539	29
2020.05.21.	24	36	11	64	114	363	84	24	13	26	214	27	500	28	49	17	17	63	241	1726	3641	510	27
2020.05.22.	24	36	11	61	114	365	84	24	13	26	222	28	510	28	38	17	17	63	243	1754	3678	483	23
2020.05.23.	24	36	11	61	114	366	84	24	13	26	234	31	516	28	38	17	17	63	245	1765	3713	462	21
2020.05.24.	24	36	11	61	114	367	84	24	13	26	236	32	525	28	38	17	17	63	245	1780	3741	442	28
2020.05.25.	24	36	11	61	114	368	84	24	13	26	243	32	527	28	38	17	17	64	245	1784	3756		30
2020.05.26.	24	36	11	61	114	368	84	24	13	26	244	34	531	28	38	17	17	65	247	1789	3771	436	27
2020.05.27.	24	36	11	61	114	369	84	24	13	26	243	35	535	28	39	17	17	65	247	1805	3793	430	25
2020.05.28.	24	36	11	61	115	369	84	24	13	17	250	36	541	29	38	17	17	65	251	1818	3816	404	24
2020.05.29.	24	36	11	61	115	370	84	24	13	18	252	37	547	29	40	17	17	65	252	1829	3841	384	24
2020.05.30.	24	36	11	61	115	370	84	25	14	18	259	42	550	29	40	17	17	65	252	1838	3867	414	22
2020.05.31.	24	36	11	61	115	371	85	25	14	18	259	43	552	29	40	17	17	65	253	1841	3876	419	25
2020.06.01.	24	36	11	61	115	371	85	25	14	18	262	43	554	29	41	17	17	66	255	1848	3892	417	25
2020.06.02.	24	36	11	61	115	371	85	25	14	18	264	43	563	29	41	17	17	66	255	1866	3921	427	24
2020.06.03.	24	36	11	61	115	371	85	25	13	18	268	47	563	29	42	17	17	66	255	1868	3931	414	24
2020.06.04.	24	36	11	61	115	371	85	25	14	18	272	47	567	29	43	17	17	66	256	1880	3954	406	24
2020.06.05.	24	36	11	61	115	371	85	25	14	18	273	47	575	29	43	17	17	66	257	1886	3970	397	21
2020.06.06.	24	37	11	61	115	373	85	25	14	17	278	50	579	22	43	17	17	66	258	1898	3990	387	21
2020.06.07.	24	37	11	62	115	374	85	25	14	17	283	52	582	22	43	17	17	66	259	1903	4008	386	21
2020.06.08.	24	37	11	62	115	374	85	25	14	17	283	52	584	22	44	17	17	66	259	1906	4014	385	21
2020.06.09.	24	37	11	62	115	374	85	25	14	17	285	52	585	22	44	17	17	66	259	1906	4017	365	20
2020.06.10.	24	38	11	62	115	374	85	26	14	17	287	52	589	22	44	14	17	67	259	1910	4027	344	20
2020.06.11.	20	37	11	62	116	374	85	27	14	17	290	52	590	22	47	14	17	67	260	1917	4039	321	19
2020.06.12.	20	39	13	62	117	375	85	27	14	17	295	49	592	22	47	14	17	66	260	1922	4053	290	20
2020.06.13.	20	39	13	62	118	376	86	27	14	17	298	51	593	22	47	13	17	63	261	1927	4064	283	20
2020.06.14.	20	39	13	62	118	376	86	27	14	17	298	51	595	22	47	13	17	63	261	1930	4069	275	20
2020.06.15.	21	39	13	62	118	376	86	27	14	17	300	51	597	22	47	13	17	63	261	1932	4076	275	19
2020.06.16.	20	39	13	62	118	376	86	27	14	17	298	51	593	22	47	13	17	63	261	1927	4077	255	17
2020.06.17.	20	39	13	62	118	376	86	27	14	18	301	51	597	22	48	13	17	63	261	1932	4078	210	16
2020.06.18.	20	39	13	62	117	376	86	27	14	18	301	51	597	22	48	13	17	63	261	1934	4079	199	15
2020.06.19.	20	39	13	62	117	376	86	27	14	18	301	51	598	22	48	13	17	63	261	1935	4081	192	15
2020.06.20.	20	39	13	62	117	376	86	27	14	18	301	51	600	22	48	13	17	63	260	1939	4086	186	15
2020.06.21.	20	39	13	62	117	376	86	27	14	18	301	51	604	22	48	13	17	63	260	1943	4094	185	15
2020.06.22.	20	39	13	62	117	376	86	27	14	19	302	51	605	22	50	13	17	63	260	1946	4102	185	15
2020.06.23.	20	39	13	62	117	376	86	27	14	19	302	51	608	22	50	13	17	63	260	1948	4107	183	14
2020.06.24.	20	40	13	62	117	376	86	27	14	19	302	51	609	22	50	13	17	63	261	1952	4114	183	13
2020.06.25.	20	40	13	62	112	376	86	27	14	19	305	51	615	22	50	13	17	63	261	1957	4123	182	13
2020.06.26.	20	40	13	62	112	376	86	27	14	19	305	51	616	22	51	13	17	63	261	1959	4127	179	13
2020.06.27.	20	40	13	62	112	376	86	21	14	19	307	51	617	22	51	13	17	63	261	1973	4138	174	11
2020.06.28.	20	40	13	62	112	376	86	22	14	19	307	51	617	22	51	13	17	63	262	1975	4142	172	9
2020.06.29.	20	40	13	62	112	376	86	22	14	19	307	51	618	22	51	13	17	63	262	1977	4145	170	9
2020.06.30.	20	40	13	62	112	377	86	22	14	19	307	52	624	22	51	14	17	63	262	1978	4155	169	9
2020.07.01.	20	40	13	62	112	377	86	22	14	19	307	52	625	22	51	14	17	63	262	1979	4157	169	8
2020.07.02.	21	40	13	62	112	378	86	22	15	19	307	52	627	22	51	14	17	63	262	1983	4166	157	8
2020.07.03.	21	40	13	63	112	378	87	22	18	19	307	52	627	22	52	14	17	63	262	1983	4172	150	9
2020.07.04.	21	40	13	63	112	378	87	22	18	17	307	52	629	22	52	13	17	63	262	1986	4174	140	8
2020.07.05.	21	40	13	65	113	378	87	22	19	17	307	52	631	22	53	13	17	63	262	1988	4183	144	8
2020.07.06.	21	40	13	70	113	379	87	22	19	17	307	52	631	22	53	13	17	63	262	1988	4189	144	8
2020.07.07.	21	40	13	82	113	379	88	23	20	17	307	52	632	22	53	13	17	63	262	1988	4205	142	7
2020.07.08.	21	40	13	84	113	379	88	23	20	17	307	52	635	22	53	13	17	63	262	1988	4210	132	6
2020.07.09.	23	40	15	85	113	379	89	23	20	17	307	52	639	22	53	13	17	63	262	1988	4220	131	6
2020.07.10.	24	40	15	86	114	379	89	23	20	17	307	52	639	22	53	13	17	63	262	1988	4223	133	6
2020.07.11.	24	40	15	88	115	379	89	23	20	17	308	52	640	22	53	13	17	63	262	1989	4229	129	5
2020.07.12.	25	40	15	88	116	379	89	23	20	17	308	52	640	22	53	13	17	63	262	1992	4234	128	5
2020.07.13.	25	40	15	97	116	379	89	24	20	17	308	52	641	22	53	13	18	63	262	1993	4247	127	5
2020.07.14.	25	40	15	100	116	379	89	26	22	17	308	52	644	22	53	13	18	63	262	1994	4258	131	5
2020.07.15.	25	40	15	100	117	379	89	26	22	17	308	52	645	22	53	13	18	63	262	1997	4263	125	5
2020.07.16.	25	40	15	105	124	379	89	26	22	17	308	52	645	22	53	13	18	63	262	2001	4279	109	5
2020.07.17.	25	41	15	108	125	379	89	26	22	18	308	52	648	22	53	13	18	63	262	2006	4293	83	4
2020.07.18.	25	41	15	115	130	379	90	25	23	18	308	52	651	23	53	13	18	65	262	2009	4315	83	3
2020.07.19.	27	41	15	117	133	379	90	26	23	18	308	52	656	23	53	13	19	65	263	2012	4333	82	3
2020.07.20.	27	41	15	118	134	379	90	26	24	18	308	53	657	24	53	13	19	65	262	2013	4339	83	5
2020.07.21.	27	41	14	120	134	379	90	28	24	19	308	53	660	24	53	13	19	65	262	2014	4347	78	4
2020.07.22.	29	41	15	121	137	379	90	30	24	20	309	53	663	24	53	13	19	65	262	2019	4366	76	4
2020.07.23.	30	41	15	121	138	379	91	40	24	20	309	53	663	24	53	13	19	66	262	2019	4380	76	4
2020.07.24.	30	41	15	122	138	379	93	40	26	20	310	53	666	25	54	13	23	66	263	2021	4398	70	4
2020.07.25.	30	41	15	124	138	379	97	43	28	21	312	53	669	26	54	13	23	66	264	2028	4424	68	5
2020.07.26.	31	41	15	124	138	380	97	43	28	22	312	53	675	27	54	13	23	66	264	2029	4435	69	6
2020.07.27.	31	41	15	125	139	380	98	44	28	22	312	53	680	27	54	13	24	66	264	2032	4448	71	6
2020.07.28.	31	41	15	126	139	380	98	46	28	23	312	53	681	27	54	14	24	66	264	2034	4456	76	6
2020.07.29.	31	41	15	126	139	380	98	49	28	23	312	53	682	27	54	14	24	67	265	2037	4465	76	6
2020.07.30.	31	41	15	127	140	380	100	55	27	23	312	54	682	28	54	15	24	67	265	2044	4484	76	6
2020.07.31.	31	42	16	128	143	380	102	55	27	24	312	53	685	28	54	15	25	67	265	2053	4505	73	6
2020.08.01.	31	44	16	130	144	379	102	55	27	24	312	53	690	28	54	15	25	71	265	2061	4526	73	6
2020.08.02.	31	45	17	130	144	379	102	55	28	24	312	53	690	28	54	17	27	72	265	2062	4535	71	7
2020.08.03.	31	45	17	131	144	379	102	56	28	24	312	53	691	28	54	18	27	74	265	2065	4544	74	7
2020.08.04.	31	45	17	137	144	379	102	57	28	24	312	53	691	28	54	18	27	74	265	2067	4553	75	7
2020.08.05.	31	45	17	139	146	379	102	59	28	24	312	53	692	28	55	18	28	76	265	2067	4564	72	7
2020.08.06.	35	46	17	142	148	379	103	61	28	25	313	54	695	28	56	18	28	87	265	2069	4597	74	8
2020.08.07.	35	46	18	143	150	379	103	62	28	25	315	54	695	33	56	19	30	91	265	2074	4621	72	6
2020.08.08.	35	47	18	144	151	382	103	68	28	26	315	54	700	33	57	18	30	96	265	2081	4653	69	6
2020.08.09.	39	52	18	145	151	382	103	70	28	26	315	56	703	33	58	18	35	108	265	2091	4696	73	6
2020.08.10.	40	53	18	145	152	382	104	80	28	28	315	56	706	33	60	18	35	114	265	2099	4731	61	6
2020.08.11.	40	54	18	145	153	382	104	82	29	28	315	56	706	33	61	18	35	122	265	2100	4746	62	5
2020.08.12.	40	54	19	146	153	382	104	83	29	28	315	56	706	33	66	18	38	131	265	2102	4768	64	5
2020.08.13.	41	54	19	147	155	382	104	91	29	31	315	56	708	33	75	18	38	138	266	2113	4813	66	5
2020.08.14.	42	54	19	149	155	382	104	93	30	32	315	56	713	33	85	20	39	141	266	2125	4853	64	6
2020.08.15.	44	54	19	149	156	382	106	89	30	32	315	56	721	33	93	20	39	141	266	2132	4877	63	6
2020.08.16.	44	54	19	150	156	382	106	93	31	33	315	57	725	33	98	20	39	142	277	2142	4916	62	6
2020.08.17.	47	54	19	151	156	386	106	95	31	33	315	57	727	33	99	21	41	144	277	2154	4946	62	6
2020.08.18.	47	54	19	151	157	386	107	95	31	33	315	57	735	33	101	21	41	147	277	2163	4970	60	6
2020.08.19.	47	55	19	152	157	391	109	95	32	33	315	57	738	33	101	21	42	148	279	2178	5002	57	7
2020.08.20.	49	56	19	153	158	392	109	97	32	35	315	59	741	33	108	21	42	150	279	2198	5046	57	7
2020.08.21.	50	58	19	154	158	393	113	100	33	35	315	62	747	33	116	21	43	154	279	2215	5098	58	6
2020.08.22.	50	58	19	156	158	393	114	110	33	35	315	62	751	33	120	21	43	154	279	2229	5133	60	7
2020.08.23.	50	58	19	156	158	393	114	110	33	36	316	62	754	33	120	21	43	154	279	2246	5155	59	7
2020.08.24.	51	58	19	157	158	394	114	113	33	36	316	62	757	33	137	21	43	154	279	2256	5191	59	9
2020.08.25.	50	58	19	157	159	394	114	115	33	37	316	62	761	33	143	21	43	154	279	2267	5215	57	7
2020.08.26.	50	59	20	163	159	401	117	126	33	35	318	62	769	33	139	22	43	158	279	2302	5288	64	7
2020.08.27.	50	63	21	166	159	403	119	129	35	38	321	62	782	36	143	24	43	160	279	2346	5379	69	8
2020.08.28.	55	67	21	173	162	413	123	142	38	41	323	62	793	36	155	25	44	161	279	2398	5511	78	7
2020.08.29.	61	72	23	180	165	415	129	148	38	44	326	64	823	38	160	27	44	164	280	2468	5669	90	7
2020.08.30.	69	83	22	183	170	429	154	172	40	47	328	63	854	39	167	31	48	176	283	2603	5961	90	7
2020.08.31.	72	87	25	186	176	435	156	185	40	50	334	65	869	41	172	32	49	179	286	2700	6139	103	7
2020.09.01.	72	96	26	188	176	432	156	189	47	50	336	70	886	41	172	33	49	189	287	2762	6257	96	7
2020.09.02.	78	96	29	194	187	437	164	210	45	51	346	71	945	43	184	34	51	201	296	2960	6622	98	7
2020.09.03.	86	111	29	201	195	452	175	228	66	53	348	78	987	45	198	40	55	204	296	3076	6923	100	7
2020.09.04.	103	118	33	210	220	463	191	254	77	63	352	78	1054	54	221	47	57	223	302	3262	7382	120	7
2020.09.05.	112	121	34	223	231	498	204	282	81	69	358	84	1147	60	250	54	63	235	315	3471	7892	139	9
2020.09.06.	120	149	36	230	259	534	225	287	91	72	372	87	1202	75	270	70	69	248	322	3669	8387	151	11
2020.09.07.	127	174	38	253	263	556	244	322	105	76	377	97	1284	83	293	84	75	255	336	3921	8963	164	11
2020.09.08.	143	181	41	276	277	554	253	340	111	84	383	102	1314	94	310	87	76	266	343	4069	9304	192	12
2020.09.09.	153	182	53	283	300	575	262	347	111	88	389	102	1404	97	315	85	85	279	345	4260	9715	221	13
2020.09.10.	161	205	55	295	316	598	274	363	120	98	401	106	1464	108	333	96	88	295	349	4466	10191	234	11
2020.09.11.	195	219	68	315	334	630	303	410	134	118	407	113	1568	120	375	111	91	311	352	4735	10909	259	12
2020.09.12.	211	234	75	346	372	671	363	437	149	148	445	129	1681	135	379	126	117	333	382	5092	11825	282	15
2020.09.13.	214	247	76	348	388	697	394	460	153	153	454	139	1752	145	381	130	121	342	385	5330	12309	282	16
2020.09.14.	229	260	85	391	423	748	442	491	172	181	469	149	1852	156	430	142	137	365	391	5640	13153	287	16
2020.09.15.	254	270	88	392	476	770	487	495	192	207	488	153	1960	159	417	155	145	378	401	5992	13879	306	17
2020.09.16.	267	283	90	407	495	799	523	532	193	214	502	168	2031	165	468	155	151	407	408	6202	14460	324	18
2020.09.17.	279	299	103	438	515	802	556	546	201	232	533	168	2138	178	501	162	173	430	416	6500	15170	328	21
2020.09.18.	302	318	111	465	587	818	622	614	202	248	562	172	2225	197	566	181	195	474	430	6822	16111	374	29
2020.09.19.	321	349	118	506	637	850	664	648	213	276	586	199	2296	227	608	191	228	492	452	7059	16920	386	30
2020.09.20.	335	370	134	557	666	899	703	694	231	299	619	207	2455	257	667	199	239	520	467	7472	17990	404	32
2020.09.21.	350	395	141	581	712	926	783	733	241	328	647	219	2634	262	709	206	250	541	474	7734	18866	463	35
2020.09.22.	372	409	153	622	786	945	811	803	256	343	679	227	2679	268	779	203	257	550	474	7883	19499	534	36
2020.09.23.	407	424	186	669	870	1009	886	813	269	375	697	242	2771	277	820	221	344	570	486	8114	20450	558	35
2020.09.24.	428	450	226	686	944	1026	937	834	282	403	717	250	2883	310	840	225	351	576	495	8337	21200	549	32
2020.09.25.	459	476	244	740	1002	1046	1048	861	300	430	728	287	2973	342	854	231	376	603	509	8618	22127	577	30
2020.09.26.	474	503	259	803	1042	1079	1138	913	337	495	745	311	3050	358	923	235	400	632	528	8852	23077	589	36
2020.09.27.	493	568	270	840	1068	1115	1182	955	358	514	767	323	3165	382	970	250	440	654	545	9155	24014	620	38
2020.09.28.	513	611	283	846	1097	1177	1233	958	368	546	799	337	3238	420	970	261	459	670	568	9362	24716	693	44
2020.09.29.	548	616	293	896	1129	1200	1275	981	385	598	802	362	3362	424	1006	263	506	688	584	9649	25567	755	51
2020.09.30.	563	657	299	955	1157	1212	1329	1052	391	621	831	379	3489	433	1055	265	522	696	594	9961	26461	773	54
2020.10.01.	583	688	308	962	1178	1231	1367	1060	417	655	843	388	3737	440	1056	272	525	702	604	10293	27309	757	52
2020.10.02.	605	714	328	1128	1234	1290	1466	1190	431	676	869	428	3866	471	1174	282	565	730	610	10576	28631	740	47
2020.10.03.	643	759	348	1203	1295	1316	1539	1263	471	726	910	448	3974	496	1220	292	603	756	620	10835	29717	704	43
2020.10.04.	656	784	355	1262	1319	1333	1623	1363	487	754	940	481	4049	504	1302	301	631	786	630	11015	30575	685	42
2020.10.05.	664	798	350	1424	1335	1353	1667	1400	527	771	954	556	4164	514	1328	303	656	837	648	11231	31480	649	40
2020.10.06.	677	822	364	1541	1374	1370	1737	1419	538	798	983	575	4254	552	1349	311	675	865	673	11424	32298	627	37
2020.10.07.	704	845	378	1672	1398	1402	1805	1498	558	812	999	584	4324	557	1433	313	688	876	696	11572	33144	656	41
2020.10.08.	719	900	398	1697	1456	1429	1857	1509	549	893	1008	605	4444	586	1444	326	727	901	722	11876	34046	804	56
2020.10.09.	787	939	439	1728	1536	1445	1994	1600	582	920	1033	655	4562	624	1513	335	764	944	756	12066	35222	993	82
2020.10.10.	816	939	486	1849	1603	1509	2155	1685	611	992	1059	696	4699	629	1584	335	807	974	796	12372	36596	1174	110
2020.10.11.	856	1015	500	1898	1658	1527	2252	1734	683	1006	1071	723	4791	683	1706	355	831	1007	823	12545	37664	1252	138
2020.10.12.	863	1063	526	1987	1702	1582	2348	1781	696	1052	1110	766	4957	704	1714	371	865	1054	854	12842	38837	1418	154
2020.10.13.	884	1075	538	2079	1719	1585	2385	1853	746	1071	1137	799	5081	718	1886	384	915	1103	869	13035	39862	1519	160
2020.10.14.	900	1095	552	2214	1770	1594	2494	1912	786	1097	1152	820	5179	728	1923	381	949	1126	878	13232	40782	1538	156
2020.10.15.	926	1124	555	2268	1820	1645	2557	1948	827	1158	1161	836	5298	756	1943	390	953	1149	893	13525	41732	1555	167
2020.10.16.	980	1172	583	2311	1876	1687	2632	1979	854	1177	1213	879	5546	781	1989	422	1008	1192	940	13804	43025	1642	171
2020.10.17.	1029	1225	620	2460	1961	1738	2784	2043	928	1212	1246	938	5744	818	2090	460	1100	1256	992	14172	44816	1693	185
2020.10.18.	1067	1281	642	2585	1992	1778	2873	2136	990	1232	1265	1028	5989	867	2217	471	1159	1258	1026	14434	46290	1712	179
2020.10.19.	1114	1310	688	2711	2070	1819	2961	2312	1011	1292	1305	1061	6103	881	2340	492	1249	1349	1078	14622	47768	1896	188
2020.10.20.	1161	1338	704	2715	2121	1831	3000	2314	1071	1317	1355	1095	6244	890	2351	504	1315	1413	1129	14889	48757	1960	197
2020.10.21.	1181	1361	726	2939	2135	1862	3133	2413	1110	1334	1397	1126	6387	898	2523	516	1363	1446	1157	15173	50180	2023	201
2020.10.22.	1244	1416	752	3185	2197	1927	3276	2557	1173	1436	1401	1190	6565	917	2698	534	1399	1532	1190	15623	52212	2132	197
2020.10.23.	1330	1460	793	3248	2326	1961	3371	2755	1207	1547	1436	1273	6827	942	2847	561	1464	1628	1255	16047	54278	2209	200
2020.10.24.	1419	1541	843	3275	2456	2028	3511	2767	1297	1603	1495	1310	6998	971	2851	580	1560	1735	1386	16472	56098	2245	205
2020.10.25.	1526	1657	879	3632	2657	2141	3667	2879	1410	1762	1555	1414	7350	1022	2941	609	1771	1951	1466	16958	59247	2449	221
2020.10.26.	1619	1691	975	3735	2752	2192	3832	2913	1466	1876	1559	1500	7714	1027	3178	627	1873	2056	1597	17381	61563	2602	233
2020.10.27.	1659	1716	1021	4014	2794	2249	3912	3082	1508	1909	1648	1615	7971	1038	3322	638	1946	2204	1615	17781	63642	2891	243
2020.10.28.	1742	1747	1067	4230	2863	2301	4049	3174	1561	1935	1754	1670	8275	1055	3495	650	2105	2261	1660	18339	65933	3166	263
2020.10.29.	1836	1878	1121	4334	2952	2383	4114	3297	1645	1989	1780	1711	8601	1109	3624	666	2177	2307	1729	18874	68127	3197	255
2020.10.30.	2092	2006	1220	4517	3228	2525	4362	3434	1680	2023	1842	1767	8985	1195	3737	717	2239	2466	1816	19562	71413	3753	267
2020.10.31.	2288	2106	1372	4836	3413	2641	4797	3834	1753	2038	1907	1857	9276	1264	3961	773	2419	2584	1971	20231	75321	4048	281
2020.11.01.	2438	2245	1356	6459	3588	2744	4738	4027	1821	2427	1930	1918	9567	1332	4055	817	2322	2718	1962	20735	79199	4205	306
2020.11.02.	2597	2389	1458	5282	3799	2955	5247	4297	1984	2633	2043	2058	10168	1466	4495	891	2504	2873	2179	21462	82780	4417	313
2020.11.03.	2836	2452	1643	5582	3892	3111	5557	4432	2014	2938	2142	2160	10748	1481	4643	949	2689	2980	2251	22269	86769	4767	348
2020.11.04.	3219	2562	1704	5792	4076	3240	5761	4632	2046	3018	2183	2246	11418	1554	4977	969	2798	3085	2411	23297	90988	4871	355
2020.11.05.	3408	2623	1776	5906	4262	3358	6005	4778	2165	3093	2280	2389	12049	1638	5264	1018	2887	3267	2497	24253	94916	5183	378
2020.11.06.	3624	2730	1895	6109	4457	3435	6322	5031	2271	3148	2417	2468	12849	1674	5460	1108	2911	3550	2571	25595	99625	5489	391
2020.11.07.	3779	2972	1984	6343	4533	3602	6928	5215	2423	3486	2544	2529	13605	1938	5662	1124	3129	3681	2769	26697	104943	5612	405
2020.11.08.	4031	3093	2181	6460	4686	3729	7429	5526	2546	3562	2702	2671	14197	2052	5727	1347	3181	3909	2895	27692	109616	5803	417
2020.11.09.	4207	3262	2321	6836	4807	4076	8048	5771	2640	3760	2821	2706	14851	2162	6015	1379	3236	4139	3019	28722	114778	6061	415
2020.11.10.	4331	3361	2466	7002	4992	4128	8468	6057	2809	4071	2938	2793	15451	2196	6236	1478	3394	4327	3062	29358	118918	6153	461
2020.11.11.	4402	3468	2492	7135	5058	4222	8939	6408	2867	4089	3049	2946	16107	2293	6397	1502	3517	4458	3169	30345	122863	6352	473
2020.11.12.	4731	3532	2578	7204	5274	4351	9250	6433	3050	4250	3208	3059	16673	2399	6406	1593	3702	4629	3357	31111	126790	6426	486
2020.11.13.	4995	3655	2824	7219	5476	4468	9796	6434	3299	4495	3386	3220	17423	2569	6405	1678	3943	4878	3422	32302	131887	6690	518
2020.11.14.	5328	3761	2962	7250	5700	4690	10235	6454	3516	4761	3510	3493	17993	2692	6428	1928	4230	5057	3479	33256	136723	7029	531
2020.11.15.	5477	3874	3025	7357	5769	4812	10538	6486	3702	4858	3722	3658	18635	2810	6443	1976	4471	5365	3599	34384	140961	7013	569
2020.11.16.	5647	3990	3306	8217	6045	4843	10639	7353	3889	4965	3914	3711	19247	2857	7938	2026	4504	5580	3611	35174	147456	7236	582
2020.11.17.	5848	4046	3424	8766	6266	4991	10895	7705	4043	5114	4133	3782	19821	2967	8216	2060	4716	5866	3863	36137	152659	7477	576
2020.11.18.	6123	4132	3498	9026	6447	5270	11032	8086	4140	5152	4237	3827	20385	2997	8480	2093	4795	5975	4032	37222	156949	7499	581
2020.11.19.	6318	4241	3632	9173	6636	5507	11144	8539	4329	5298	4431	3879	21041	3071	8592	2141	4943	6193	4204	38149	161461	7532	580
2020.11.20.	6574	4394	3835	9423	6865	5718	11326	8809	4388	5375	4624	3983	21715	3147	8702	2231	5051	6386	4376	38979	165901	7512	604
2020.11.21.	6792	4521	4003	9674	7002	5954	11628	9026	4490	5474	4744	4041	22311	3247	8942	2297	5302	6564	4527	39759	170298	7358	599
2020.11.22.	6935	4641	4127	10039	7223	6058	11918	9162	4616	5653	4890	4105	22889	3385	9064	2349	5563	6723	4642	40636	174618	7278	618
2020.11.23.	7150	4785	4248	10337	7303	6157	12079	9220	4687	5766	4970	4162	23372	3436	9229	2468	5762	6859	4711	41251	177952	7461	627
2020.11.24.	7412	4874	4380	10744	7471	6229	12410	9571	4755	5928	5154	4188	23873	3521	9449	2565	5844	6987	4785	41741	181881	7598	638
2020.11.25.	7659	5035	4674	11040	7660	6312	12522	9716	4831	5995	5283	4306	24439	3578	9670	2572	5999	7091	4851	42454	185687	7718	656
2020.11.26.	8034	5197	4945	11346	8037	6528	12823	10111	4909	6261	5471	4466	25329	3729	9966	2682	6158	7442	5049	43564	192047	7537	640
2020.11.27.	8558	5338	5458	11677	8501	6709	13065	10405	5118	6586	5653	4629	25964	3875	10246	2818	6503	7794	5267	44276	198440	7591	647
2020.11.28.	8963	5509	5873	12180	8840	6937	13454	10707	5318	6898	5828	4718	26582	4138	10510	3006	6715	8011	5467	45054	204708	7536	644
2020.11.29.	9329	5737	6286	12814	9120	7150	13883	11015	5601	7267	6036	4952	27272	4309	10723	3237	6986	8293	5599	45918	211527	7590	657
2020.11.30.	9555	5873	6491	13216	9305	7425	14155	11565	5801	7434	6231	5030	28015	4434	11022	3352	7079	8494	5831	46814	217122	7734	666
2020.12.01.	9719	5966	6659	13496	9360	7469	14384	11900	5892	7664	6425	5099	28542	4525	11398	3411	7224	8662	5938	47340	221073	7884	662
2020.12.02.	9908	6083	6811	13733	9593	7579	14593	12122	6080	7849	6566	5238	29124	4690	11548	3468	7327	8861	6051	47985	225209	7732	649
2020.12.03.	10177	6233	7129	14098	9966	7859	14917	12544	6291	8150	6735	5439	30187	4903	11889	3704	7514	9131	6232	48746	231844	7693	663
2020.12.04.	10534	6423	7429	14387	10227	8098	15201	12992	6451	8418	6924	5610	30897	5094	12283	3859	7704	9379	6466	49680	238056	7812	639
2020.12.05.	10759	6612	7654	14604	10462	8279	15479	13335	6619	8611	7089	5733	31617	5275	12454	4007	7913	9640	6653	50786	243581	7695	637
2020.12.06.	11051	6871	7946	14970	10735	8505	15762	13836	6823	8955	7346	5885	32317	5448	12813	4227	8224	9929	6882	51753	250278	7709	656
2020.12.07.	11238	6983	8092	15174	10912	8665	15917	14026	6937	9086	7476	5967	32934	5538	12961	4323	8357	10089	7057	52416	254148	7932	674
2020.12.08.	11331	7051	8185	15208	10984	8756	16034	14117	7029	9208	7607	6017	33252	5614	13068	4393	8433	10171	7121	52788	256367	8045	656
2020.12.09.	11427	7187	8354	15381	11122	8842	16170	14336	7140	9382	7749	6105	33611	5753	13197	4460	8568	10350	7191	53263	259588	7945	661
2020.12.10.	11720	7374	8628	15635	11461	9073	16425	14709	7279	9600	7902	6311	34142	6031	13455	4617	8767	10589	7384	53901	265003	7869	645
2020.12.11.	11990	7610	8932	15899	11781	9350	16673	15114	7431	9911	8110	6501	34893	6294	13752	4845	8956	10834	7633	54691	271200	7841	610
2020.12.12.	12226	7854	9231	16196	12075	9569	16903	15387	7601	10183	8283	6662	35351	6523	13959	4976	9130	11076	7752	55310	276247	7807	610
2020.12.13.	12374	8023	9384	16465	12262	9783	17090	15612	7713	10442	8428	6788	35776	6736	14125	5121	9282	11264	7931	55801	280400	7646	606
2020.12.14.	12568	8169	9531	16608	12468	9950	17254	15795	7806	10575	8558	6903	36231	6828	14269	5278	9369	11364	8034	56312	283870	7667	605
2020.12.15.	12638	8245	9629	16690	12560	9993	17287	15891	7858	10716	8668	6929	36494	6896	14351	5323	9442	11465	8109	56579	285763	7845	597
2020.12.16.	12728	8361	9765	16854	12737	10106	17381	16151	7948	10834	8769	7056	36780	6937	14507	5366	9549	11574	8164	57000	288567	7639	574
2020.12.17.	12899	8514	9845	17028	12865	10206	17502	16439	8046	10990	8860	7174	37044	7020	14662	5484	9611	11709	8299	57352	291549	7522	573
2020.12.18.	13084	8709	9939	17173	13155	10432	17693	16694	8191	11196	9053	7268	37623	7184	14870	5659	9713	11870	8435	58036	295977	7335	564
2020.12.19.	13346	8856	10189	17402	13528	10598	17827	16928	8316	11321	9176	7422	38076	7415	15015	5742	9816	12015	8580	58454	300022	7295	538
2020.12.20.	13474	9056	10292	17557	13686	10741	17926	17054	8392	11443	9351	7480	38412	7508	15138	5817	9896	12140	8678	58948	302989	7022	520
2020.12.21.	13632	9163	10359	17619	13820	10833	17980	17197	8465	11533	9409	7525	38700	7650	15220	5884	9964	12210	8732	59235	305130	7097	517
2020.12.22.	13680	9256	10405	17654	13868	10879	18000	17291	8494	11591	9446	7537	38839	7712	15323	5909	10018	12288	8782	59396	306368	7124	522
2020.12.23.	13746	9361	10500	17747	13959	10969	18085	17416	8555	11700	9511	7618	39001	7812	15398	5944	10060	12372	8814	59694	308262	6727	495
2020.12.24.	13953	9561	10639	17869	14157	11113	18292	17660	8650	11829	9613	7692	39332	7994	15510	6018	10137	12518	8892	60125	311554	6382	491
2020.12.25.	14084	9739	10717	18005	14264	11216	18419	17858	8694	11954	9670	7752	39601	8113	15630	6067	10203	12646	8970	60562	314164	6006	489
2020.12.26.	14197	9839	10770	18020	14331	11244	18457	17947	8752	12034	9711	7754	39734	8166	15711	6082	10208	12665	8988	60752	315362	6003	468
2020.12.27.	14247	9879	10804	18076	14394	11275	18481	17999	8760	12062	9721	7755	39784	8180	15762	6092	10248	12696	9031	60814	316060	6072	467
2020.12.28.	14280	9915	10811	18100	14433	11292	18486	18025	8771	12127	9727	7779	39843	8208	15786	6140	10256	12724	9042	60924	316669	6261	448
2020.12.29.	14318	9984	10842	18146	14503	11337	18521	18092	8801	12167	9754	7789	39909	8260	15848	6172	10269	12750	9068	61041	317571	6298	444
2020.12.30.	14387	10098	10894	18193	14588	11441	18606	18264	8866	12256	9814	7849	40131	8349	15906	6206	10336	12823	9131	61405	319543	6155	425
2020.12.31.	14557	10291	10977	18327	14783	11577	18730	18490	8946	12398	9904	7963	40421	8471	16014	6294	10414	12984	9221	61752	322514	5856	402
2021.01.01.	14751	10473	11075	18481	14942	11736	18814	18652	9029	12489	9986	8018	40667	8594	16121	6403	10482	13137	9348	62080	325278	5648	401
2021.01.02.	14845	10537	11152	18522	14994	11816	18871	18747	9073	12568	9999	8046	40487	8679	16209	6413	10512	13182	9378	62298	326688	5529	402
2021.01.03.	14934	10613	11194	18607	15056	11890	18939	18796	9102	12631	10048	8049	41036	8720	16277	6503	10517	13205	9455	62423	327995	5619	403
2021.01.04.	14967	10658	11222	18651	15110	11956	18950	18847	9124	12645	10071	8052	41179	8748	16324	6521	10560	13214	9473	62579	328851	5667	400
2021.01.05.	15007	10730	11255	18682	15162	12007	18974	18901	9152	12674	10094	8063	41258	8793	16396	6569	10574	13230	9505	62695	329721	5760	394
2021.01.06.	15095	10860	11340	18769	15257	12137	19079	19008	9201	12745	10165	8133	41471	8942	16458	6634	10634	13308	9543	62989	331768	5646	396
2021.01.07.	15261	10984	11462	18884	15371	12314	19225	19205	9249	12843	10269	8230	41880	9075	16576	6702	10696	13507	9665	63438	334836	5387	367
2021.01.08.	15412	11119	11553	18989	15575	12453	19376	19368	9367	12968	10343	8304	42135	9275	16726	6827	10789	13689	9755	63738	337743	5297	372
2021.01.09.	15549	11298	11612	19124	15666	12620	19478	19446	9419	13017	10407	8324	42499	9400	16863	7055	10848	13798	9849	64187	340459	5126	365
2021.01.10.	15622	11428	11653	19227	15735	12725	19540	19535	9475	13116	10526	8367	42703	9470	16930	7101	10895	13875	9892	64422	342237	4980	357
2021.01.11.	15701	11567	11685	19276	15777	12853	19586	19576	9511	13162	10578	8406	42880	9534	16989	7158	10921	13955	9938	64603	343656	5065	367
2021.01.12.	15743	11634	11694	19294	15813	12897	19591	19596	9516	13188	10597	8412	42992	9547	17024	7211	10947	13982	9945	64729	344352	5005	356
2021.01.13.	15807	11718	11710	19350	15882	12940	19666	19681	9585	13250	10680	8454	43115	9612	17063	7259	10976	14035	9983	64944	345710	4870	339
2021.01.14.	15946	11811	11748	19433	15958	13078	19740	19800	9688	13306	10781	8502	43298	9705	17138	7325	11033	14118	10022	65206	347636	4689	344
2021.01.15.	16034	11918	11780	19515	16029	13158	19806	19870	9759	13362	10819	8537	43434	9805	17217	7383	11068	14178	10102	65375	349149	4600	337
2021.01.16.	16120	11999	11818	19599	16089	13229	19863	19948	9796	13403	10872	8564	43608	9864	17288	7431	11096	14227	10159	65614	350587	4408	328
2021.01.17.	16162	12076	11854	19675	16153	13327	19900	19992	9834	13458	10910	8590	43802	9896	17325	7500	11128	14264	10191	65791	351828	4345	329
2021.01.18.	16201	12118	11883	19722	16175	13377	19980	20028	9848	13492	10948	8603	43912	9933	17352	7526	11141	14319	10222	65923	352703	4445	330
2021.01.19.	16232	12151	11904	19744	16192	13401	19988	20056	9868	13515	10975	8612	43966	9959	17409	7550	11164	14346	10251	65993	353276	4445	309
2021.01.20.	16284	12220	11959	19803	16227	13457	20006	20100	9900	13544	11005	8643	44065	10010	17444	7569	11196	14408	10274	66138	354252	4218	294
2021.01.21.	16342	12319	11990	19855	16281	13574	20067	20161	9956	13591	11048	8680	44218	10077	17513	7614	11238	14475	10316	66347	355662	4049	286
2021.01.22.	16404	12404	12041	19916	16343	13643	20133	20205	9996	13631	11099	8720	44361	10124	17580	7661	11270	14535	10382	66525	356973	3959	274
2021.01.23.	16474	12470	12065	19971	16413	13751	20180	20253	10034	13679	11161	8760	44537	10179	17634	7709	11322	14587	10427	66711	358317	3854	259
2021.01.24.	16534	12559	12085	20091	16468	13812	20218	20344	10064	13706	11193	8789	44693	10233	17678	7747	11347	14635	10461	66917	359574	3793	254
2021.01.25.	16584	12609	12108	20125	16501	13845	20246	20389	10075	13734	11235	8805	44819	10257	17723	7777	11360	14673	10485	67068	360418	3814	247
2021.01.26.	16614	12637	12128	20139	16529	13872	20254	20405	10080	13751	11251	8812	44871	10278	17753	7789	11379	14691	10506	67138	360877	3815	263
2021.01.27.	16670	12690	12144	20209	16559	13905	20291	20477	10122	13790	11278	8850	44983	10319	17774	7809	11412	14743	10550	67306	361881	3809	255
2021.01.28.	16767	12759	12184	20278	16615	13976	20366	20567	10179	13855	11363	8891	45168	10359	17827	7863	11464	14824	10594	67557	363450	3669	255
2021.01.29.	16837	12827	12228	20373	16687	14063	20416	20662	10200	13912	11430	8923	45321	10413	17895	7928	11505	14879	10644	67766	364909	3649	258
2021.01.30.	16914	12903	12274	20420	16747	14127	20484	20754	10229	13956	11475	8959	45489	10457	17967	7979	11548	14934	10675	67988	366279	3582	264
2021.01.31.	17031	12969	12303	20549	16784	14177	20513	20800	10255	14003	11540	8994	45658	10491	18008	7998	11599	14975	10706	68233	367586	3562	268
2021.02.01.	17098	13017	12316	20608	16832	14221	20580	20858	10273	14042	11569	9003	45830	10549	18058	8032	11628	15028	10738	68430	368710	3682	273
2021.02.02.	17131	13029	12338	20627	16852	14236	20595	20872	10285	14065	11612	9016	45908	10577	18078	8048	11655	15055	10761	68548	369288	3729	272
2021.02.03.	17186	13093	12352	20679	16884	14281	20636	20928	10311	14119	11642	9056	46057	10619	18110	8082	11692	15093	10779	68737	370336	3697	269
2021.02.04.	17295	13179	12388	20765	16941	14345	20693	21060	10356	14169	11708	9111	46269	10698	18208	8147	11734	15152	10801	68969	371988	3648	289
2021.02.05.	17371	13242	12427	20842	16992	14409	20765	21131	10403	14209	11794	9155	46432	10766	18324	8211	11802	15198	10835	69256	373564	3638	302
2021.02.06.	17460	13294	12449	20937	17038	14449	20852	21204	10443	14248	11864	9181	46646	10835	18413	8253	11867	15252	10855	69585	375125	3601	298
2021.02.07.	17518	13348	12479	21020	17084	14491	20933	21268	10476	14273	11932	9214	46863	10873	18518	8290	11883	15293	10874	69865	376495	3578	291
2021.02.08.	17586	13377	12498	21131	17111	14519	21009	21310	10490	14303	11979	9236	47074	10912	18590	8323	11909	15336	10884	70078	377655	3717	295
2021.02.09.	17652	13424	12530	21199	17156	14577	21037	21366	10519	14330	12013	9268	47209	10952	18677	8350	11934	15367	10907	70267	378734	3792	304
2021.02.10.	17710	13483	12552	21271	17204	14612	21098	21447	10580	14365	12051	9317	47384	11033	18722	8373	11952	15432	10927	70500	380013	3747	296
2021.02.11.	17802	13543	12593	21399	17293	14690	21210	21520	10620	14415	12113	9363	47680	11107	18814	8449	11979	15481	10957	70847	381875	3799	299
2021.02.12.	17894	13600	12628	21557	17371	14724	21323	21598	10660	14450	12214	9417	47920	11186	18928	8512	12005	15552	10977	71219	383735	3828	299
2021.02.13.	18008	13661	12664	21687	17431	14814	21431	21682	10710	14479	12302	9454	48247	11271	19000	8566	12037	15577	11006	71728	385755	3771	299
2021.02.14.	18076	13713	12689	21859	17490	14861	21564	21752	10743	14499	12442	9500	48457	11340	19062	8613	12067	15631	11027	72077	387462	3755	312
2021.02.15.	18161	13739	12715	21943	17539	14903	21621	21832	10765	14514	12549	9517	48681	11386	19145	8650	12095	15662	11042	72340	388792	3883	314
2021.02.16.	18211	13761	12723	21970	17563	14919	21644	21866	10781	14523	12616	9542	48833	11409	19220	8668	12112	15673	11056	72532	389622	3979	318
2021.02.17.	18285	13825	12752	22054	17636	14973	21764	21950	10827	14546	12677	9642	49040	11502	19279	8689	12139	15720	11074	72796	391170	4014	321
2021.02.18.	18432	13905	12811	22273	17776	15107	21930	22106	10888	14605	12815	9758	49387	11686	19415	8778	12174	15798	11103	73276	394023	4021	332
2021.02.19.	18615	13999	12880	22517	17895	15217	22116	22306	10932	14645	12975	9840	49760	11891	19573	8888	12208	15865	11141	73853	397116	4024	352
2021.02.20.	18749	14054	12916	22714	18019	15376	22294	22451	10994	14681	13168	9942	50232	12070	19765	8973	12247	15927	11174	74365	400111	4147	351
2021.02.21.	18877	14128	12959	22994	18122	15472	22453	22596	11035	14718	13305	10048	50692	12199	19913	9023	12302	15987	11197	75003	403023	4233	366
2021.02.22.	18998	14169	13000	23142	18223	15613	22655	22723	11063	14753	13449	10077	51135	12315	20010	9071	12341	16044	11228	75627	405646	4489	394
2021.02.23.	19070	14187	13029	23164	18272	15659	22694	22769	11108	14774	13613	10129	51444	12389	20086	9117	12379	16082	11234	76075	407274	4582	396
2021.02.24.	19165	14260	13065	23296	18341	15769	22831	22940	11140	14808	13775	10253	52032	12519	20164	9165	12425	16167	11272	76742	410129	4353	407
2021.02.25.	19398	14377	13153	23541	18524	16041	23071	23183	11220	14858	13929	10430	52779	12708	20364	9278	12485	16265	11327	77583	414514	4836	411
2021.02.26.	19592	14463	13235	23946	18689	16287	23377	23370	11320	14916	14109	10608	53497	12992	20583	9387	12580	16367	11379	78485	419182	5027	451
2021.02.27.	19796	14550	13322	24284	18879	16507	23737	23569	11388	14976	14353	10775	54323	13279	20882	9506	12702	16468	11433	79401	424130	5282	482
2021.02.28.	19983	14619	13386	24618	19030	16681	24095	23792	11459	15020	14591	10929	55029	13563	21088	9600	12790	16543	11467	80316	428599	5482	524
2021.03.01.	20134	14690	13425	24848	19208	16893	24402	24038	11530	15058	14820	10994	55740	13833	21309	9684	12838	16647	11518	81316	432925	5679	537
2021.03.02.	20222	14757	13461	24903	19295	16974	24545	24150	11563	15084	15026	11059	56346	13970	21467	9722	12887	16676	11538	82044	435689	6071	581
2021.03.03.	20353	14849	13515	25093	19431	17117	24759	24334	11671	15121	15324	11250	57093	14212	21657	9806	12956	16816	11575	82968	439900	6367	622
2021.03.04.	20652	14992	13639	25447	19746	17453	25165	24675	11769	15201	15631	11458	58003	14509	21980	9950	13075	16978	11645	84210	446178	6554	639
2021.03.05.	20945	15135	13757	25856	20005	17836	25677	25117	11885	15303	15835	11626	58861	14917	22339	10083	13241	17138	11718	85273	452547	6867	677
2021.03.06.	21241	15310	13875	26307	20241	18279	26165	25498	12014	15388	16245	11885	59981	15304	22683	10252	13406	17324	11783	86635	459816	7243	751
2021.03.07.	21533	15447	13950	26690	20475	18656	26605	25764	12167	15458	16536	12087	60882	15673	23003	10421	13551	17449	11838	87832	466017	7445	778
2021.03.08.	21650	15511	13992	26909	20572	18733	26843	25884	12210	15511	16655	12219	61305	15810	23178	10486	13623	17520	11876	88326	468713	7924	806
2021.03.09.	21872	15694	14082	27045	20812	19043	27202	26149	12326	15600	17115	12232	62605	16193	23521	10636	13726	17647	11930	89777	475207	8270	833
2021.03.10.	22069	15826	14145	27279	20982	19214	27438	26432	12475	15664	17430	12408	63759	16407	23774	10696	13820	17824	11961	91257	480860	8348	844
2021.03.11.	22470	16042	14289	27571	21375	19670	28090	26883	12629	15787	17708	12649	65206	16771	24285	10829	13967	18005	12074	92872	489172	8329	911
2021.03.12.	22828	16243	14418	28110	21654	20191	28666	27320	12746	15926	18066	12890	66969	17136	24735	10996	14144	18214	12161	94770	498183	8718	949
2021.03.13.	23230	16482	14567	28690	22022	20734	29288	27768	12973	16064	18439	13171	68460	17624	25225	11159	14393	18487	12287	96594	507627	8897	989
2021.03.14.	23586	16642	14685	29258	22298	21135	29875	28146	13133	16183	19021	13384	69845	18074	25598	11355	14681	18767	12389	98435	516490	8764	1005
2021.03.15.	23982	16835	14797	29662	22606	21650	30299	28493	13278	16270	19360	13561	71373	18310	25940	11487	14796	18953	12470	100074	524196	9300	1008
2021.03.16.	24161	16969	14863	29730	22791	21855	30541	28683	13369	16386	19674	13642	72253	18643	26222	11614	15016	19104	12554	101052	529122	9844	1067
2021.03.17.	24324	17095	14929	29954	22892	22043	30626	28817	13501	16441	19851	13762	72823	18788	26430	11701	15113	19188	12590	101710	532578	10284	1128
2021.03.18.	24610	17318	15027	30249	23138	22323	30909	29194	13700	16575	20111	14004	73854	19245	26724	11787	15255	19432	12638	102987	539080	10386	1170
2021.03.19.	25153	17605	15238	30834	23536	22989	31591	29721	13917	16778	20463	14329	75634	19785	27193	11960	15514	19769	12806	105024	549839	10264	1174
2021.03.20.	25824	17939	15488	31345	24067	23581	32355	30366	14163	17046	20879	14700	77276	20376	27821	12163	15830	20229	12976	106547	560971	10583	1237
2021.03.21.	26462	18217	15693	32012	24488	24150	33008	30732	14408	17228	21217	14958	79015	20791	28308	12386	16102	20535	13068	108818	571596	10652	1273
2021.03.22.	26937	18459	15869	32472	24782	24854	33430	31188	14553	17370	21822	15092	80598	21124	28779	12582	16246	20861	13180	110444	580642	11276	1340
2021.03.23.	27245	18674	15982	32565	24943	25163	33770	31395	14832	17533	21987	15230	81285	21354	29185	12722	16494	21077	13296	111391	586123	11873	1389
2021.03.24.	27502	18873	16160	32955	25146	25524	34013	31704	15057	17658	22331	15428	82772	21653	29522	12887	16684	21411	13369	113061	593710	11805	1423
2021.03.25.	28106	19130	16308	33368	25634	26060	34578	32252	15326	17902	22655	15711	84190	22167	30017	13075	16999	21809	13508	114552	603347	11760	1467
2021.03.26.	28789	19439	16570	34149	26148	26493	35138	32837	15571	18205	22966	15869	86046	22496	30675	13373	17374	22114	13695	116665	614612	11823	1480
2021.03.27.	29376	19752	16783	34809	26500	27180	35783	33343	15859	18360	23372	16126	87512	22887	31289	13615	17618	22572	13828	118215	624779	11779	1512
2021.03.28.	29844	20044	17002	35314	26803	27615	36210	33793	16233	18678	23753	16346	88707	23298	31789	13822	17999	22934	13996	119681	633861	11805	1527
2021.03.29.	30192	20317	17154	35622	27066	28121	36684	34103	16405	18880	24045	16478	89803	23546	32190	13996	18313	23205	14131	120873	641124	12291	1497
2021.03.30.	30342	20594	17262	35725	27141	28424	36799	34288	16693	19019	24233	16541	90454	23716	32531	14146	18474	23442	14252	121657	645733	12553	1529
2021.03.31.	30597	20931	17396	36114	27290	28730	37034	34585	16931	19200	24393	16721	91757	24069	32791	14307	18669	23751	14320	122847	652433	12346	1492
2021.04.01.	31261	21277	17628	36551	27874	29221	37500	35078	17178	19497	24656	16932	93050	24515	33255	14543	18948	24188	14498	124071	661721	12062	1512
2021.04.02.	31781	21602	17816	37177	28169	29739	38052	35573	17432	19822	24963	17117	94371	24829	33800	14785	19149	24555	14629	125415	670776	11747	1467
2021.04.03.	32257	21998	18022	37707	28499	30192	38527	36009	17683	20132	25265	17344	95323	25141	34339	14955	19457	24977	14796	126790	679413	11383	1437
2021.04.04.	32593	22257	18190	38117	28723	30641	38843	36381	17865	20340	25520	17435	96171	25339	34701	15143	19604	25205	15017	127894	685979	11571	1440
2021.04.05.	32803	22446	18293	38384	28838	30834	38936	36586	18080	20438	25625	17465	96725	25440	34945	15272	19727	25420	15096	128500	689853	11806	1451
2021.04.06.	32920	22625	18322	38512	28940	30895	38969	36660	18122	20510	25663	17514	97014	25475	35073	15337	19800	25492	15130	128770	691743	12007	1440
2021.04.07.	33052	22733	18364	38618	28998	30984	39026	36767	18238	20565	25696	17550	97245	25578	35203	15370	19903	25573	15158	129055	693676	12202	1407
2021.04.08.	33261	22928	18482	38918	29164	31193	39172	37050	18410	20724	25801	17797	97851	25874	35436	15459	20072	25881	15247	129770	698490	11663	1337
2021.04.09.	33719	23196	18675	39320	29555	31547	39571	37479	18650	21005	25966	18009	98828	26233	35817	15622	20246	26121	15404	130852	705815	11363	1364
2021.04.10.	34199	23551	18877	39783	29950	31992	40051	37945	18914	21335	26149	18173	99722	26509	36333	15844	20571	26626	15580	131764	713868	10921	1344
2021.04.11.	34539	23809	19063	40210	30197	32221	40403	38290	19191	21574	26305	18324	100476	26693	36727	15994	20813	26893	15810	132632	720164	10484	1290
2021.04.12.	34840	24093	19189	40499	30372	32617	40657	38541	19383	21800	26490	18356	101229	26820	37010	16090	20896	27152	15901	133306	725241	10740	1249
2021.04.13.	34998	24308	19309	40578	30481	32754	40692	38646	19468	21905	26532	18433	101625	26902	37194	16135	21108	27294	16001	133715	728078	10818	1209
2021.04.14.	35138	24527	19440	40822	30596	32895	40800	38848	19667	22031	26601	18555	102128	27008	37372	16194	21241	27527	16064	134221	731675	10364	1204
2021.04.15.	35461	24778	19576	41153	30877	33161	41077	39133	19819	22217	26741	18736	102821	27175	37695	16289	21394	27764	16190	134925	736982	9848	1156
2021.04.16.	35749	25044	19742	41518	31077	33380	41310	39400	20026	22497	26865	18880	103400	27344	38046	16409	21544	28016	16376	135575	742198	9459	1157
2021.04.17.	35970	25236	19877	41838	31241	33594	41487	39643	20175	22679	26986	18965	104151	27457	38282	16511	21705	28235	16497	136273	746802	8947	1093
2021.04.18.	36171	25442	19996	42107	31362	33765	41660	39861	20341	22832	27059	19028	104648	27568	38518	16579	21772	28439	16587	136773	750508	8445	1051
2021.04.19.	36336	25630	20059	42260	31489	33912	41802	40004	20398	22961	27146	19047	104932	27648	38717	16626	21877	28608	16668	137068	753188	8650	1052
2021.04.20.	36412	25787	20112	42303	31543	33983	41835	40085	20533	23065	27165	19086	105107	27698	38823	16675	21937	28692	16731	137261	754833	8602	980
2021.04.21.	36508	25943	20201	42499	31629	34066	41905	40268	20656	23179	27227	19160	105400	27804	38926	16709	22005	28891	16799	137585	757360	8097	925
2021.04.22.	36757	26106	20322	42756	31824	34275	42076	40478	20795	23326	27306	19258	105827	27919	39114	16777	22094	29069	16874	138014	760967	7507	876
2021.04.23.	36969	26259	20444	43018	31964	34408	42238	40600	20916	23487	27383	19330	106257	28004	39339	16838	22186	29244	17013	138497	764394	7177	844
2021.04.24.	37112	26409	20546	43242	32090	34529	42367	40748	21016	23618	27460	19405	106573	28089	39488	16894	22273	29406	17097	138828	767190	6737	813
2021.04.25.	37239	26548	20619	43448	32186	34650	42455	40873	21117	23720	27499	19462	106869	28136	39572	16932	22339	29523	17160	139171	769518	6284	790
2021.04.26.	37357	26644	20698	43571	32255	34793	42570	40953	21169	23802	27529	19481	107137	28179	39680	16973	22386	29630	17198	139449	771454	6443	782
2021.04.27.	37414	26740	20738	43623	32300	34853	42598	40998	21191	23860	27573	19528	107312	28212	39756	17004	22462	29699	17274	139572	772707	6360	753
2021.04.28.	37480	26840	20784	43720	32364	34928	42648	41101	21301	23954	27597	19580	107557	28258	39811	17030	22511	29805	17323	139807	774399	5907	702
2021.04.29.	37637	26968	20881	43908	32497	35071	42756	41233	21400	24077	27653	19658	107938	28321	39898	17079	22583	29932	17400	140093	776983	5554	662
2021.04.30.	37782	27074	20976	44077	32584	35192	42872	41341	21486	24209	27702	19715	108220	28370	39997	17143	22649	30058	17493	140408	779348	5937	677
2021.05.01.	37887	27191	21040	44213	32660	35263	42971	41428	21554	24339	27729	19751	108478	28403	40072	17207	22711	30173	17559	140670	781299	5191	621
2021.05.02.	37990	27288	21098	44339	32724	35330	43032	41505	21605	24426	27772	19776	108669	28462	40136	17241	22772	30259	17599	140869	782892	5031	587
2021.05.03.	38073	27341	21140	44413	32774	35380	43117	41566	21634	24485	27810	19786	108844	28490	40214	17267	22798	30317	17646	141016	784111	4872	572
2021.05.04.	38117	27396	21179	44445	32794	35408	43132	41598	21680	24547	27818	19820	108925	28509	40253	17281	22821	30351	17670	141093	784837	4739	549
2021.05.05.	38168	27459	21208	44538	32837	35466	43205	41669	21722	24617	27829	19847	109028	28538	40291	17298	22863	30424	17714	141246	785967	4374	511
2021.05.06.	38268	27546	21263	44687	32907	35561	43269	41762	21782	24710	27850	19895	109275	28570	40357	17322	22898	30520	17775	141430	787647	4104	485
2021.05.07.	38382	27618	21336	44829	32961	35631	43330	41848	21838	24801	27877	19925	109455	28599	40428	17356	22955	30585	17825	141609	789188	3855	445
2021.05.08.	38469	27678	21369	44936	33010	35672	43434	41898	21881	24886	27912	19956	109630	28628	40480	17384	22996	30653	17881	141811	790564	3633	420
2021.05.09.	38515	27719	21397	45063	33031	35720	43581	41941	21925	24950	27945	19976	109761	28648	40531	17405	23023	30713	17921	141938	791709	3353	403
2021.05.10.	38550	27737	21433	45134	33058	35750	43634	41962	21941	24990	27965	19994	109834	28669	40563	17417	23052	30745	17957	142001	792386	3384	394
2021.05.11.	38573	27753	21455	45154	33093	35770	43651	41974	21952	25029	27987	20001	109930	28679	40580	17430	23060	30776	17978	142054	792879	3282	379
2021.05.12.	38610	27798	21475	45244	33123	35811	43698	42012	21991	25066	28032	20029	110046	28704	40597	17455	23079	30833	17993	142188	793784	2974	361
2021.05.13.	38674	27887	21514	45375	33199	35865	43804	42082	22040	25128	28077	20059	110242	28723	40648	17473	23107	30916	18022	142365	795200	2782	354
2021.05.14.	38716	27968	21545	45501	33222	35898	43905	42120	22090	25198	28116	20077	110400	28735	40707	17506	23147	30981	18055	142503	796390	2612	338
2021.05.15.	38756	28035	21571	45596	33251	35942	43949	42159	22114	25237	28155	20091	110565	28756	40739	17530	23172	31045	18076	142690	797429	2453	308
2021.05.16.	38785	28075	21595	45668	33274	35955	43981	42192	22138	25289	28167	20117	110656	28782	40777	17545	23199	31085	18093	142774	798147	2270	261
2021.05.17.	38804	28095	21610	45708	33294	35971	43998	42213	22148	25348	28174	20117	110699	28793	40808	17552	23213	31101	18111	142816	798573	2259	258
2021.05.18.	38813	28114	21622	45731	33300	35981	44016	42230	22173	25365	28192	20122	110760	28799	40823	17565	23226	31122	18129	142872	798955	2197	251
2021.05.19.	38856	28152	21641	45788	33320	35999	44048	42258	22204	25381	28209	20142	110844	28806	40841	17577	23242	31163	18151	142966	799588	1908	224
2021.05.20.	38897	28204	21665	45856	33340	36029	44100	42297	22230	25437	28235	20155	110933	28814	40864	17596	23268	31208	18167	143073	800368	1836	212
2021.05.21.	38932	28225	21693	45916	33364	36049	44131	42329	22250	25466	28260	20175	111021	28822	40902	17610	23305	31235	18190	143150	801025	1645	195
2021.05.22.	38964	28270	21710	45967	33382	36068	44167	42354	22267	25497	28281	20183	111105	28832	40950	17624	23343	31267	18211	143230	801671	1500	183
2021.05.23.	38979	28287	21714	46023	33392	36078	44185	42373	22287	25521	28290	20195	111156	28840	40971	17629	23374	31287	18231	143276	802088	1399	185
2021.05.24.	38991	28296	21722	46046	33405	36087	44189	42382	22290	25543	28290	20201	111182	28846	40979	17634	23388	31309	18243	143323	802346	1420	169
2021.05.25.	38994	28298	21724	46075	33410	36090	44200	42385	22299	25547	28291	20202	111208	28849	40991	17634	23397	31328	18251	143337	802510	1417	159
2021.05.26.	39006	28326	21738	46089	33417	36097	44215	42388	22303	25554	28298	20206	111241	28853	41001	17647	23401	31332	18256	143355	802723	1373	148
2021.05.27.	39018	28353	21751	46120	33424	36119	44230	42408	22313	25568	28321	20215	111296	28863	41026	17655	23415	31348	18268	143408	803119	1215	136
2021.05.28.	39045	28385	21771	46166	33443	36140	44249	42430	22329	25577	28333	20227	111355	28867	41043	17663	23433	31370	18283	143458	803567	1120	121
2021.05.29.	39065	28416	21791	46219	33449	36157	44276	42450	22332	25601	28353	20237	111406	28875	41061	17674	23453	31394	18301	143522	804032	1024	114
2021.05.30.	39071	28427	21805	46261	33459	36181	44302	42464	22353	25613	28357	20241	111448	28886	41080	17689	23465	31415	18309	143556	804382	965	114
2021.05.31.	39081	28434	21808	46274	33463	36184	44304	42473	22358	25623	28359	20243	111478	28891	41087	17694	23468	31424	18312	143577	804538	981	110
2021.06.01.	39095	28443	21814	46286	33464	36194	44312	42479	22361	25631	28365	20255	111502	28892	41096	17695	23474	31435	18320	143599	804712	947	100
2021.06.02.	39099	28460	21825	46315	33466	36202	44320	42497	22368	25638	28370	20260	111551	28900	41106	17698	23487	31447	18325	143653	804987	837	90
2021.06.03.	39114	28473	21836	46348	33488	36212	44330	42509	22376	25647	28378	20268	111603	28909	41112	17707	23495	31464	18335	143698	805302	739	77
2021.06.04.	39127	28481	21837	46383	33506	36221	44341	42514	22383	25663	28382	20272	111644	28913	41121	17714	23502	31477	18343	143747	805571	702	78
2021.06.05.	39141	28491	21845	46423	33517	36235	44354	42518	22395	25669	28385	20285	111703	28915	41132	17723	23517	31489	18352	143782	805871	622	70
2021.06.06.	39145	28495	21850	46433	33524	36241	44364	42521	22398	25671	28387	20289	111730	28920	41135	17723	23525	31494	18353	143810	806008	602	68
2021.06.07.	39148	28496	21860	46445	33530	36244	44366	42523	22398	25674	28389	20293	111742	28921	41138	17725	23526	31498	18354	143819	806089	599	67
2021.06.08.	39153	28501	21865	46454	33533	36246	44367	42530	22403	25681	28394	20295	111764	28922	41147	17729	23533	31504	18357	143828	806206	591	63
2021.06.09.	39160	28508	21867	46475	33539	36252	44377	42535	22407	25687	28405	20302	111801	28923	41150	17732	23542	31510	18361	143852	806385	549	58
2021.06.10.	39164	28514	21874	46493	33542	36256	44386	42543	22416	25701	28409	20306	111850	28927	41152	17735	23547	31520	18370	143886	806591	481	57
2021.06.11.	39173	28523	21879	46513	33555	36269	44398	42553	22421	25710	28419	20310	111876	28927	41160	17738	23555	31527	18374	143910	806790	442	51
2021.06.14.	39187	28532	21887	46547	33562	36273	44406	42570	22430	25724	28427	20316	111914	28933	41168	17742	23559	31537	18382	143949	807045	406	47
2021.06.15.	39191	28535	21891	46557	33562	36273	44407	42572	22432	25726	28429	20318	111920	28933	41175	17744	23559	31540	18384	143954	807102	391	44
2021.06.16.	39193	28539	21895	46566	33564	36276	44411	42574	22442	25729	28438	20321	111930	28935	41178	17747	23560	31547	18385	143979	807209	349	53
2021.06.17.	39196	28541	21900	46578	33568	36283	44417	42578	22447	25732	28443	20325	111948	28936	41180	17757	23564	31550	18385	143994	807322	320	45
2021.06.18.	39198	28545	21912	46587	33570	36287	44419	42587	22451	25735	28445	20327	111963	28940	41183	17759	23567	31554	18386	144013	807428	289	43
2021.06.21.	39210	28546	21919	46608	33571	36291	44425	42606	22461	25744	28449	20334	111996	28941	41195	17760	23572	31560	18388	144054	807630	275	39
2021.06.22.	39213	28549	21920	46612	33572	36294	44427	42606	22462	25746	28451	20336	112005	28941	41198	17761	23578	31562	18389	144062	807684	281	32
2021.06.23.	39219	28551	21922	46619	33573	36294	44430	42607	22468	25751	28454	20338	112025	28941	41200	17763	23580	31567	18390	144083	807775	241	32
2021.06.24.	39227	28554	21923	46623	33575	36294	44432	42609	22471	25753	28457	20341	112032	28941	41201	17766	23592	31569	18390	144094	807844	215	30
2021.06.25.	39233	28554	21923	46630	33575	36295	44438	42611	22475	25754	28464	20343	112040	28943	41202	17767	23592	31571	18390	144110	807910	182	22
2021.06.28.	39240	28558	21925	46646	33576	36301	44441	42617	22478	25757	28468	20346	112062	28945	41205	17769	23602	31576	18393	144137	808042	157	24
2021.06.29.	39240	28558	21926	46648	33577	36301	44443	42617	22478	25760	28469	20347	112065	28945	41209	17769	23602	31580	18393	144149	808076	150	22
2021.06.30.	39242	28560	21928	46657	33579	36305	44445	42618	22480	25760	28471	20349	112069	28948	41210	17769	23602	31581	18393	144162	808128	126	23
2021.07.01.	39244	28561	21931	46660	33581	36305	44446	42619	22481	25761	28471	20349	112075	28951	41211	17769	23602	31581	18393	144169	808160	120	20
2021.07.02.	39246	28562	21931	46666	33581	36306	44447	42619	22481	25761	28472	20351	112079	28953	41212	17772	23606	31583	18393	144176	808197	98	22
2021.07.05.	39247	28565	21932	46667	33582	36309	44450	42619	22482	25761	28472	20352	112090	28957	41215	17772	23608	31585	18393	144204	808262	82	18
2021.07.06.	39248	28566	21936	46669	33582	36309	44451	42619	22483	25765	28473	20352	112093	28957	41219	17773	23609	31585	18394	144211	808294	88	21
2021.07.07.	39249	28567	21937	46672	33583	36309	44456	42621	22484	25767	28475	20354	112098	28957	41220	17774	23610	31588	18394	144223	808338	80	17
2021.07.08.	39250	28567	21939	46680	33584	36313	44461	42621	22487	25770	28477	20355	112103	28958	41223	17775	23610	31588	18398	144234	808393	72	13
2021.07.09.	39250	28570	21940	46689	33586	36313	44463	42622	22488	25770	28477	20357	112111	28960	41223	17776	23611	31592	18398	144241	808437	87	13
2021.07.12.	39258	28571	21945	46695	33592	36316	44468	42623	22491	25771	28482	20360	112121	28963	41226	17776	23619	31597	18399	144266	808539	73	12
2021.07.13.	39260	28571	21945	46695	33592	36316	44468	42624	22492	25771	28484	20361	112125	28964	41226	17776	23619	31598	18399	144270	808556	86	12
2021.07.14.	39264	28575	21949	46700	33594	36318	44468	42625	22493	25773	28485	20361	112132	28967	41226	17780	23619	31600	18400	144283	808612	84	11
2021.07.15.	39264	28575	21950	46706	33597	36320	44470	42626	22494	25773	28486	20361	112139	28968	41230	17780	23621	31603	18400	144298	808661	83	9
2021.07.16.	39270	28580	21951	46706	33600	36324	44473	42627	22494	25777	28487	20361	112142	28971	41232	17782	23624	31608	18401	144315	808725	86	10
2021.07.19.	39275	28585	21952	46715	33604	36327	44474	42628	22495	25781	28490	20361	112181	28973	41238	17785	23629	31614	18401	144356	808864	76	11
2021.07.20.	39275	28587	21953	46717	33606	36327	44477	42628	22495	25782	28490	20362	112185	28973	41238	17786	23630	31615	18401	144362	808889	77	11
2021.07.21.	39279	28592	21958	46723	33608	36329	44477	42628	22496	25786	28490	20363	112188	28974	41240	17789	23631	31616	18401	144377	808945	76	10
2021.07.22.	39279	28594	21960	46727	33609	36333	44477	42629	22503	25786	28492	20364	112202	28981	41241	17790	23633	31620	18401	144395	809016	64	10
2021.07.23.	39280	28595	21961	46741	33610	36334	44488	42633	22504	25786	28493	20365	112215	28984	41242	17790	23635	31621	18401	144423	809101	67	9
2021.07.26.	39281	28598	21966	46755	33611	36338	44493	42635	22507	25789	28500	20367	112237	28989	41244	17792	23639	31625	18405	144491	809262	55	9
2021.07.27.	39282	28598	21967	46757	33613	36339	44493	42635	22508	25789	28500	20367	112241	28992	41246	17792	23640	31625	18405	144499	809288	73	11
2021.07.28.	39284	28602	21968	46765	33615	36342	44494	42637	22509	25790	28500	20367	112249	29000	41250	17792	23641	31628	18405	144524	809362	71	11
2021.07.29.	39285	28606	21968	46768	33618	36345	44496	42641	22511	25790	28504	20367	112259	29006	41251	17794	23644	31633	18405	144539	809427	79	13
2021.07.30.	39286	28606	21969	46775	33619	36351	44499	42461	22513	25790	28508	20369	112267	29011	41251	17795	23645	31634	18405	144557	809491	78	11
2021.08.02.	39296	28609	21971	46785	33622	36357	44506	42647	22514	25790	28510	20374	112283	29018	41253	17800	23646	31640	18406	144619	809646	76	11
2021.08.03.	39296	28611	21971	46789	33622	36357	44506	42468	22514	25791	28511	20374	112286	29019	41253	17800	23646	31641	18407	144630	809672	77	10
2021.08.04.	39301	28614	21974	46794	33623	36358	44510	42650	22517	25795	28511	20376	112292	29021	41254	17800	23647	31641	18407	144646	809731	82	8
2021.08.05.	39304	28620	21974	46797	33623	36358	44511	42652	22521	25796	28512	20376	112299	29023	41255	17802	23650	31642	18407	144681	809803	79	11
2021.08.06.	39306	28623	21974	46799	33623	36358	44516	42656	22521	25796	28513	20378	112311	29024	41255	17803	23650	31642	18407	144700	809855	76	12
2021.08.09.	39308	28627	21974	46804	33624	36366	44527	42661	22527	25797	28515	20380	112338	29031	41256	17804	23652	31650	18407	144763	810011	75	11
2021.08.10.	39308	28630	21974	46810	33624	36367	44529	42663	22528	25797	28515	20381	112345	29032	41256	17804	23653	31650	18408	144772	810046	87	15
2021.08.11.	39309	28637	21976	46814	33624	36369	44534	42666	22533	25798	28515	20382	112357	29040	41260	17804	23657	31650	18409	144792	810126	79	15
2021.08.12.	39311	28640	21978	46815	33628	36371	44542	42672	22541	25800	28516	20384	112371	29041	41263	17805	23657	31651	18410	144816	810212	80	15
2021.08.13.	39314	28642	21980	46818	33631	36376	44554	42674	22547	25802	28517	20386	112379	29043	41266	17806	23658	31655	18412	144856	810316	83	14
2021.08.16.	39316	28646	21983	46827	33636	36380	44558	42684	22553	25804	28519	20390	112411	29047	41272	17808	23661	31658	18413	144938	810504	93	11
2021.08.17.	39321	28649	21984	46827	33637	36386	44560	42685	22554	25805	28519	20390	112413	29049	41273	17808	23662	31660	18413	144954	810549	85	11
2021.08.18.	39328	28655	21987	46831	33640	36397	44565	42692	22555	25811	28519	20392	112430	29050	41276	17808	23662	31663	18413	144984	810658	75	11
2021.08.19.	39334	28656	21987	46836	33643	34601	44573	42696	22560	25815	28521	20397	112444	29053	41279	17811	23663	31667	18416	145029	810781	76	11
2021.08.23.	39347	28664	21991	46849	33666	36414	44587	42704	22566	25834	28528	20406	112500	29060	41284	17813	23667	31677	18417	145147	811121	73	10
2021.08.24.	39350	28670	21991	46852	33669	36418	44590	42705	22567	25836	28528	20406	112512	29061	41288	17814	23667	31679	18418	145182	811203	81	11
2021.08.25.	39354	28673	21992	46858	33672	36426	44598	42707	22570	25838	28528	20413	112542	29065	41288	17814	23667	31680	18419	145233	811337	92	13
2021.08.26.	39362	28680	21994	46863	33682	36436	44603	42712	22575	25842	28529	20416	112580	29071	41290	17815	23667	31688	18421	145291	811517	93	9
2021.08.27.	39372	28682	21999	46871	33686	36445	44608	42713	22579	25846	28532	20420	112603	29079	41293	17815	23670	31689	18428	145376	811706	82	8
2021.08.30.	39392	28696	22004	46889	33707	36463	44635	42725	22590	25865	28553	20432	112683	29090	41302	17819	23675	31702	18432	145573	812227	98	7
2021.08.31.	39397	28697	22012	46892	33710	36467	44640	42728	22591	25866	28558	20433	112697	29095	41304	17820	23677	31703	18432	145618	812337	119	13
2021.09.01.	39401	28700	22012	46897	33714	36474	44652	42735	22595	25873	28563	20442	112742	29101	41304	17821	23685	31707	18437	145676	812531	132	13
2021.09.02.	39415	28705	22018	46912	33725	36487	44665	42739	22600	25879	28564	20451	112786	29108	41312	17824	23690	31715	18442	145756	812793	138	16
2021.09.03.	39431	28712	22026	46923	33728	36489	44683	42750	22611	25885	28568	20458	112822	29112	41316	17835	23696	31724	18444	145827	813040	149	19
2021.09.06.	39453	28739	22048	46950	33758	36511	44723	42771	22625	25907	28573	20477	112915	29122	41328	17849	23705	31744	18447	146043	813688	194	23
2021.09.07.	39464	28744	22052	46962	33763	36515	44724	42773	22629	25910	28574	20480	112937	29125	41330	17850	23710	31745	18451	146080	813818	210	24
2021.09.08.	39473	28757	22054	46967	33768	36526	44733	42788	22632	25916	28576	20491	112990	29130	41334	17853	23718	31749	18453	146156	814064	208	26
2021.09.09.	39491	28763	22061	46987	33790	36543	44742	42800	22650	25923	28586	20504	113036	29138	41335	17866	23724	31765	18455	146250	814409	215	26
2021.09.10.	39506	28768	22067	47004	33811	36551	44753	42818	22663	25928	28588	20514	113083	29147	41342	17868	23732	31785	18456	146348	814732	220	30
2021.09.13.	39550	28792	22088	47054	33849	36570	44798	42854	22693	25956	28601	20540	113218	29168	41364	17876	23746	31808	18470	146610	815605	266	34
2021.09.14.	39557	28795	22098	47066	33858	36574	44807	42863	22702	25960	28607	20552	113259	29170	41371	17877	23750	31817	18478	146690	815851	300	43
2021.09.15.	39570	28810	22113	47080	33871	36583	44821	42886	22712	25976	28613	20569	113319	29177	41383	17882	23758	31824	18487	146788	816222	307	40
2021.09.16.	39590	28822	22127	47117	33890	36590	44839	42912	22731	25996	28617	20578	113396	29195	41393	17886	23768	31838	18502	146893	816680	343	40
2021.09.17.	39606	28839	22140	47141	33912	36604	44852	42932	22748	26008	28632	20591	113464	29207	41416	17889	23779	31848	18515	147036	817159	353	41
2021.09.20.	39662	28888	22169	47241	33954	36629	44896	42979	22788	26034	28644	20622	113644	29240	41446	17893	23790	31877	18538	147297	818231	380	45
2021.09.21.	39670	28896	22182	47259	33962	36635	44906	42987	22790	26043	28650	20627	113710	29245	41456	17893	23791	31884	18547	147387	818520	401	45
2021.09.22.	39689	28908	22194	47300	33979	36647	44921	43016	22800	26061	28651	20641	113789	29255	41468	17895	23801	31902	18561	147543	819021	406	46
2021.09.23.	39712	28931	22205	47341	34009	36660	44934	43051	22813	26080	28659	20659	113854	29267	41487	17904	23809	31917	18585	147670	819547	411	48
2021.09.24.	39723	28946	22220	47385	34042	36678	44953	43078	22829	26102	28667	20674	113955	29284	41500	17909	23820	31941	18593	147779	820078	438	54
2021.09.27.	39779	28988	22259	47493	34104	36709	45014	43142	22858	26162	28687	20707	114133	29295	41517	17916	23844	31979	18617	148058	821261	478	71
2021.09.28.	39785	28992	22271	47506	34118	36715	45020	43154	22866	26171	28690	20715	114198	29299	41520	17918	23848	31987	18624	148129	821526	513	74
2021.09.29.	39794	29016	22291	47559	34152	36726	45044	43180	22881	26204	28699	20731	114292	29306	41522	17925	23862	32007	18632	148249	822072	529	81
2021.09.30.	39832	29037	22308	47616	34177	36742	45067	43208	22901	26234	28713	20751	114405	29315	41540	17927	23878	32035	18648	148371	822705	539	87
2021.10.01.	39861	29075	22326	47673	34203	36765	45086	43249	22925	26275	28725	20780	114490	29326	41556	17930	23893	32060	18665	148521	823384	533	84
2021.10.04.	39934	29138	22374	47829	34276	36798	45143	43335	22988	26354	28741	20839	114719	29346	41587	17936	23927	32111	18688	148813	824876	560	87
2021.10.05.	39943	29146	22397	47838	34287	36807	45162	43352	22993	26365	28748	20848	114779	29347	41594	17938	23935	32115	18696	148880	825170	585	86
2021.10.06.	39964	29166	22433	47910	34325	36815	45184	43396	23005	26391	28752	20884	114873	29357	41609	17943	23952	32129	18707	149004	825799	574	79
2021.10.07.	39997	29201	22456	47986	34390	36837	45217	43448	23038	26435	28762	20916	114992	29369	41639	17949	23975	32153	18722	149154	826636	627	92
2021.10.08.	40012	29277	22496	48064	34456	36857	45258	43493	23062	26464	28771	20937	115110	29385	41664	17954	23990	32178	18738	149294	827410	650	100
2021.10.11.	40100	29314	22594	48251	34642	36910	45341	43629	23102	26572	28790	20978	115384	29419	41713	17972	24040	32233	18765	149707	829456	715	109
2021.10.12.	40121	29343	22627	48272	34682	36914	45354	43655	23123	26596	28798	20981	115464	29423	41730	17973	24046	32237	18771	149801	829911	733	110
2021.10.13.	40152	29382	22679	48360	34741	36932	45381	43699	23135	26624	28810	21014	115589	29437	41746	17976	24058	32264	18783	149963	830725	737	116
2021.10.14.	40202	29431	22735	48487	34841	36974	45422	43757	23167	26696	28822	21041	115749	29459	41774	17987	24073	32285	18806	150158	831866	742	113
2021.10.15.	40250	29498	22797	48624	34968	37019	45464	43830	23202	26785	28833	21072	115915	29479	41803	17996	24087	32316	18819	150358	833115	800	124
2021.10.18.	40391	29626	22970	48901	35260	37123	45561	44010	23318	26984	28877	21135	116384	29568	41890	18026	24114	32398	18852	151001	836389	908	126
2021.10.19.	40428	29676	23044	48938	35306	37144	45577	44056	23349	27024	28888	21140	116541	29589	41919	18043	24129	32413	18873	151171	837248	999	144
2021.10.20.	40496	29760	23165	49119	35393	37220	45615	44139	23423	27104	28905	21193	116775	29620	41965	18062	24151	32450	18903	151458	838916	1058	145
2021.10.21.	40621	29851	23305	49308	35618	37300	45690	44284	23543	27238	28928	21254	117070	29678	42020	18086	24188	32512	18947	151836	841277	1105	155
2021.10.22.	40747	29962	23465	49541	35810	37389	45767	44422	23642	27413	28978	21308	117418	29730	42077	18117	24240	32575	18992	152232	843825	1233	169
2021.10.25.	41127	30180	23876	50144	36354	37586	45964	44782	23931	27863	29089	21440	118354	29851	42224	18189	24352	32728	19104	153375	850513	1588	191
2021.10.26.	41209	30254	24016	50224	36449	37620	46006	44862	23993	27988	29124	21468	118633	29893	42276	18221	24372	32752	19140	153714	852214	1685	197
2021.10.27.	41340	30396	24211	50525	36602	37728	46115	45059	24152	28193	29160	21532	119073	29946	42345	18262	24428	32830	19209	154233	855339	1798	197
2021.10.28.	41602	30604	24431	50895	36895	37879	46255	45263	24352	28439	29205	21614	119623	30017	42465	18326	24485	32931	19288	154809	859378	1970	204
2021.10.29.	41801	30780	24691	51283	37217	37999	46370	45488	24546	28768	29281	21708	120125	30094	42575	18396	24551	33007	19380	155359	863419	2130	230
2021.11.01.	42468	31255	25345	52213	37937	38389	46691	46131	25027	29755	29458	21884	121653	30322	42876	18539	24706	33317	19589	157075	874630	2605	299
2021.11.02.	42567	31349	25416	52303	38037	38448	46770	46200	25119	29926	29506	21917	121969	30348	42924	18557	24730	33347	19603	157461	876497	2839	312
2021.11.03.	42745	31487	25591	52511	38154	38530	46827	46340	25207	30085	29558	21948	122346	30389	43024	18592	24785	33427	19688	157858	879092	3172	350
2021.11.04.	43168	31806	25913	53060	38510	38693	46985	46707	25500	30513	29659	22061	123179	30515	43263	18691	24888	33583	19858	158808	885360	3366	349
2021.11.05.	43644	32120	26262	53671	39087	38902	47180	47169	25761	30926	29765	22224	123967	30675	43468	18847	25016	33726	20029	159725	892164	3629	366
2021.11.08.	44924	32874	27256	55182	40385	39515	47881	48465	26460	32287	30061	22609	125923	31094	44135	19077	25366	34179	20391	161934	909998	3980	434
2021.11.09.	45169	33102	27513	55442	40596	39618	48038	48660	26654	32692	30158	22720	126579	31181	44329	19164	25439	34373	20524	162635	914586	4522	452
2021.11.10.	45683	33471	27908	56180	40989	39901	48237	49101	27020	33501	30260	22883	127679	31361	44611	19310	25580	34647	20745	163953	923020	4830	463
2021.11.11.	46250	33868	28259	56839	41527	40180	48535	49626	27282	34093	30355	23041	128790	31544	44973	19443	25736	34882	20992	165199	931414	4990	488
2021.11.12.	46848	34223	28674	57603	42053	40451	48776	50196	27643	34604	30490	23228	129765	31751	45313	19595	25880	35107	21199	166385	939784	5147	509
2021.11.15.	48342	35058	29628	59353	43325	41085	49581	51568	28391	36380	30895	23694	132096	32245	46103	19871	26307	35787	21712	169423	960844	5286	519
2021.11.16.	48744	35317	29907	59589	43537	41208	49785	51836	28579	36850	30962	23753	132805	32342	46386	19984	26425	35988	21863	170307	966167	5811	545
2021.11.17.	49394	30323	35788	60330	44045	41562	50104	52449	28997	37619	31108	23954	134197	32543	46824	20172	26671	36274	22155	171923	976432	5852	565
2021.11.18.	50180	36243	30772	61177	44676	41883	50485	53158	29325	38259	31247	24162	135576	32789	47296	20374	26901	36688	22467	173541	987199	5969	606
2021.11.19.	50969	36686	31254	61998	45280	42262	50935	53939	29764	38887	31442	24357	136960	33038	47830	20635	27123	37163	22785	175181	998488	6122	613
2021.11.22.	52985	37666	32298	63854	46947	43262	52187	55846	30465	40312	31970	24857	140436	33729	49066	21133	27772	38032	23685	179201	1025697	6451	649
2021.11.23.	53464	38012	32565	64063	47177	43454	52374	56214	30710	40931	32143	24997	141265	33818	49499	21309	27897	38265	23847	180211	1032215	6830	663
2021.11.24.	54334	38684	33012	64905	47639	43923	52779	56884	31060	41550	32319	25234	143075	34154	50238	21570	28268	38730	24299	182195	1044852	6840	664
2021.11.25.	55121	39204	33374	65784	48251	44405	53271	57565	31402	42186	32541	25484	144635	34481	50878	21856	28569	39343	24693	183974	1057017	6858	680
2021.11.26.	55950	39708	33800	66601	48881	44850	53937	58364	31745	42710	32784	25647	145969	34826	51629	22122	28860	39919	24994	185592	1068888	6913	695
2021.11.29.	57866	40754	34663	68463	50362	45969	55188	60025	32593	44054	33409	26246	149375	35529	53350	22781	29545	41168	26134	189244	1096718	7438	538
2021.11.30.	58235	41141	34862	68626	50566	46083	55563	60467	32863	44449	33681	26348	150190	35645	53787	22945	29739	41522	26322	190074	1103108	7596	513
2021.12.01.	59047	41694	35207	69228	50896	46544	55808	61021	33140	45105	34047	26527	151792	35923	54455	23206	30130	42081	26815	191594	1114260	7546	562
2021.12.02.	59651	42229	35508	69982	51410	46899	56223	61655	33486	45483	34264	26748	153152	36170	55064	23453	30419	42584	27193	193153	1124726	7450	550
2021.12.03.	60305	42617	35778	70648	51823	47342	56632	62295	33775	45878	34654	26899	154381	36434	55746	23658	30772	43201	27612	194419	1134869	7463	566
2021.12.06.	61662	43500	36351	72040	52927	48307	57995	63717	34297	46861	35435	27432	157164	37057	56992	24147	31463	44455	28414	197351	1157568	7440	586
2021.12.07.	61983	43733	36471	72168	53080	48436	58153	63918	34439	47010	35562	27499	157755	37172	57310	24276	31612	44743	28585	197974	1161879	7568	618
2021.12.08.	62394	44100	36654	72573	53283	48697	58492	64227	34605	47181	35753	27702	158650	37358	57811	24430	31884	45133	28833	198968	1168728	7206	607
2021.12.09.	62870	44508	36816	72995	53612	48997	58930	64642	34785	47430	35993	27859	159474	37578	58384	24606	32064	45513	29092	199890	1176038	7119	579
2021.12.10.	66309	44844	37014	73337	53971	49287	59322	65084	34910	47703	36175	28010	160219	37790	58890	24758	32322	45947	29390	200640	1182922	6939	573
2021.12.13.	64163	45534	37399	74425	54597	49977	60187	66025	35251	48239	36925	28316	162131	38299	60042	25191	32835	46621	30018	202764	1198939	6531	565
2021.12.14.	64424	45678	37495	74533	54720	50074	60319	66224	35350	48424	37012	28368	162614	38372	60399	25273	32955	46851	30167	203262	1202514	6507	563
2021.12.15.	64783	45912	37613	74857	54857	50457	60589	66463	35486	48568	37212	28476	163335	38560	60836	25403	33130	47096	30345	204042	1208020	6337	540
2021.12.16.	65055	46142	37737	75202	55013	50715	60845	66713	35623	48730	37378	28601	164012	38756	61291	25519	33263	47375	30590	204758	1213318	6109	542
2021.12.17.	65307	46394	37831	75565	55197	50961	61118	67022	35702	48894	37600	28715	164558	38910	61697	25636	33444	47597	30815	205332	1218295	5865	519
2021.12.20.	65849	46827	37992	76121	55528	51452	61677	67574	35911	49222	38046	28898	165932	39217	62473	25852	33742	48072	31202	206813	1228400	5537	503
2021.12.21.	65968	46931	38055	76189	55583	51526	61743	67649	35943	49281	38117	28938	166194	39274	62700	25912	33819	48196	31310	207057	1230385	5527	501
2021.12.22.	66156	47089	38114	76362	55656	51700	61881	67822	36011	49365	38236	29015	166710	39396	62933	25996	33932	48368	31434	207568	1233744	5159	464
2021.12.23.	66317	47258	38185	76526	55767	51875	62035	68026	36071	49453	38352	29105	167229	39498	63210	26089	34032	48540	31549	208213	1237330	4827	454
2021.12.27.	66717	47601	38315	76962	56019	52297	62499	68376	36215	49680	38649	29237	168258	39719	63739	26277	34247	48893	31800	209819	1245319	4063	409
2021.12.28.	66792	47665	38358	77057	56049	52358	62544	68433	36243	49715	38695	29258	168406	39760	63859	26321	34285	48963	31896	210032	1246689	4019	374
2021.12.29.	66933	47767	38411	77176	56111	52476	62655	68562	36327	49773	38797	29317	168841	39850	64074	26374	34369	49066	31956	210859	1249694	3854	357
2021.12.30.	67093	47884	38462	77313	56185	52635	62807	68721	36385	49847	38888	29390	169345	39943	64334	26457	34363	49176	32078	211649	1253055	3697	342
2021.12.31.	67256	48012	38538	77443	56263	52773	62957	68887	36455	49925	39025	29447	169811	40034	64529	26504	34550	49304	32194	212508	1256415	3492	334
2022.01.03.	67530	48236	38609	77687	56422	53019	63267	69136	36549	50059	39191	29567	170585	40205	64859	26637	34727	49537	32369	214089	1262280	3313	318
2022.01.04.	67622	48355	38662	77763	56481	53102	63357	69241	36582	50092	39278	29606	170922	40295	65026	26695	34763	49624	32445	214798	1264709	3335	316
2022.01.05.	67857	48561	38777	77946	56582	53308	63543	69419	36684	50199	39421	29074	171759	40460	65349	26801	34883	49786	32585	216335	1269979	3090	307
2022.01.06.	68075	48737	38918	78166	56764	53573	63866	69687	36776	50314	39603	29836	172808	40674	65569	26934	35018	50019	32754	218242	1276433	3101	307
2022.01.07.	68298	48924	39037	78410	56896	53800	64168	69978	36875	50447	39810	29948	173868	40876	65985	27058	35196	50261	32943	220179	1282957	3070	291
2022.01.10.	68942	49388	39281	78892	57299	54445	64954	70596	37102	50672	40242	30185	176170	41226	66730	27352	35555	50838	33286	224457	1297612	2931	281
2022.01.11.	69072	49486	39337	78964	57371	54559	65089	70710	37152	50736	40361	30214	176761	41318	66938	27422	35667	50939	33397	225501	1300994	2932	274
2022.01.12.	69367	49756	39503	79182	57508	54826	65453	70940	37288	50859	40540	30360	178336	41523	67302	27570	35873	51138	33661	227892	1308877	2758	257
2022.01.13.	69726	50019	39626	79388	57714	55161	65923	71240	37431	51012	40783	30530	180181	41742	67720	27723	36056	51455	33943	230720	1318093	2647	249
2022.01.14.	70071	50299	39756	79647	57996	55507	66449	71587	37605	51199	41053	30638	181761	42033	68098	27886	36337	51796	34267	233029	1327014	2611	243
2022.01.17.	70925	51001	40191	80205	58800	56399	67818	72350	37940	51531	41707	30888	185494	42730	69036	28262	37065	52456	34900	238535	1348233	2630	228
2022.01.18.	71131	51311	40348	80338	58920	56554	68198	72509	38080	51668	42019	30969	186787	42928	69479	28395	37287	52699	35180	240284	1355084	2689	217
2022.01.19.	71817	51886	40718	80742	59218	57105	69130	72988	38408	51901	42472	31174	189763	43451	70190	28639	37756	53145	35641	243830	1369974	2645	208
2022.01.20.	72429	52471	41080	81235	59787	57657	70298	73516	38737	52216	43018	31433	192404	43956	70908	28910	38321	53645	36119	247360	1385500	2673	202
2022.01.21.	73127	53014	41471	81795	60382	58244	71347	74278	39081	52515	43634	31700	194884	44527	71614	29201	38888	54275	36705	250775	1401457	2674	201
2022.01.24.	74879	54456	42274	83278	61840	59885	74202	76010	39987	53367	45095	32397	201266	45765	73417	29824	40249	55965	38040	259189	1441385	2921	176
2022.01.25.	75271	54936	42535	83492	62147	60334	75060	76421	40232	53566	45415	32486	202605	46074	74036	30019	40697	56513	38291	260972	1451102	3115	177
2022.01.26.	76085	55951	43208	84216	62723	61142	76347	77212	40862	54013	46109	32761	205947	46831	75190	30422	41468	57222	38937	264630	1471276	3145	164
2022.01.27.	76911	56855	43764	84928	63489	61897	77899	78041	41356	54478	46945	33097	208645	47387	76348	30885	42181	58010	39541	267832	1490489	3267	157
2022.01.28.	77601	57595	44289	85819	64228	62704	79082	79034	41884	54872	47623	33452	210942	47976	77374	31341	42794	58811	40267	270670	1508358	3463	145
2022.01.31.	79765	59513	45537	88141	66328	64496	82309	81331	42958	56098	49480	34318	216821	49421	79819	32220	44452	60837	41635	277926	1553405	3903	150
2022.02.01.	80218	60147	45808	88543	66645	64917	82813	81865	43190	56414	49633	34459	218020	49696	80529	32484	44760	61345	41908	279433	1562827	4218	169
2022.02.02.	81145	61490	46421	89567	67253	65752	84150	82766	43834	56975	50106	34843	220749	50385	82105	33013	45309	62054	42406	282194	1582517	4341	163
2022.02.03.	81988	62444	46987	90569	68059	66504	85183	83562	44307	57514	50783	35259	222964	50915	83339	33539	45889	62825	42915	284857	1600411	4451	163
2022.02.04.	82733	63367	47504	91571	68874	67256	86244	84504	44693	58029	51353	35663	224931	51520	84429	33945	46272	63522	43280	287156	1618846	4588	168
2022.02.07.	84395	65051	48330	93798	70352	68746	88539	86458	45587	59260	52579	36434	228947	52533	86362	34636	47390	65030	44157	291978	1650562	4919	168
2022.02.08.	84723	65491	48590	94086	70565	69036	88918	86841	45857	59531	52703	36507	229836	52733	86945	34820	47689	65320	44369	293055	1657615	5167	167
2022.02.09.	85431	66482	49067	94947	71022	69539	89710	87547	46266	59976	53062	36865	231609	53182	87989	35197	48076	65843	44798	294939	1671547	5108	193
2022.02.10.	86053	67201	49454	95824	71563	70091	90447	88226	46608	60377	53462	37156	233182	53650	88868	35531	48484	66378	45143	296734	1684432	5198	198
2022.02.11.	86586	67796	49837	96755	72102	70644	91088	88885	46918	60751	53863	37404	234402	53957	89641	35842	48881	66890	45439	298310	1695991	5152	209
2022.02.14.	87546	68906	50302	98460	73070	71645	92314	90246	47415	61471	54503	37896	236741	54505	90994	36304	49676	67828	45847	301403	1717072	5186	199
2022.02.15.	87737	69261	50475	98681	73261	71801	92562	90450	47554	61596	54672	37946	237222	54627	91369	36450	49797	68049	46025	301948	1721483	5291	211
2022.02.16.	88146	69927	50751	99295	73549	72172	93044	90910	47768	61862	54890	38196	238229	54886	92109	36687	50030	68410	46275	303230	1730366	5166	203
2022.02.17.	88509	70468	50989	99971	73959	72504	93475	91346	48004	62140	55128	38420	239129	55167	92728	36915	50270	68793	46482	304547	1738944	5062	206
2022.02.18.	88816	70935	51231	100648	74257	72836	93891	91802	48236	62406	55389	38611	239840	55378	93265	37099	50474	69127	46621	305562	1746424	4919	201
2022.02.21.	89431	71678	51492	101801	74714	73374	94592	92622	48595	62853	55805	38907	241276	55667	94255	37387	50897	69788	46863	307688	1759685	4741	176
2022.02.22.	89570	71902	51612	101980	74826	73558	94765	92770	48690	62970	55884	38947	241555	55746	94549	37495	51012	69949	46973	308125	1762878	4740	177
2022.02.23.	89819	72295	51831	102481	75217	73786	95065	93107	48880	63159	56039	39102	242248	55921	95141	37636	51165	70165	47102	309005	1769164	4463	170
2022.02.24.	90040	72664	51961	102990	75428	74064	95372	93447	49033	63330	56194	39249	242792	56110	95528	37759	51308	70380	47209	309818	1774676	4199	165
2022.02.25.	90229	72917	52092	103380	75598	74235	95627	93756	49145	63532	56361	39357	243249	56253	95868	37845	51411	70569	47303	310447	1779174	3997	148
2022.02.28.	90624	73396	52293	104069	75941	74585	96115	94275	49361	63774	56616	39549	244236	56456	96424	37992	51693	70895	47416	311834	1787544	3615	132
2022.03.01.	90711	73546	52391	104215	76020	74650	96224	94408	49421	63836	56655	39586	244441	56503	96590	38054	51772	70981	47474	312103	1789581	3610	136
2022.03.02.	90896	73793	52489	104488	76147	74786	96422	94621	49526	63992	56731	39682	244797	56612	96836	38130	51864	71094	47530	312684	1793120	3313	133
2022.03.03.	91037	74036	52588	104774	76306	74917	96620	94877	49665	64128	56831	39753	245281	56721	97090	38207	51962	71235	47581	313373	1796982	3120	126
2022.03.04.	91204	74254	52675	105108	76448	75033	96755	95059	49747	64212	56956	39806	245549	56797	97310	38267	52044	71346	47634	313842	1800046	2961	127
2022.03.07.	91442	74600	52809	105604	76684	75300	97163	95391	49886	64354	57117	29946	246193	56960	97721	38372	52200	71542	47737	314877	1805898	2745	117
2022.03.08.	91492	74708	52853	105701	76723	75338	97227	95473	49934	64401	57147	39972	246318	57013	97845	38416	52242	71610	47777	315095	1807285	2766	114
2022.03.09.	91597	74919	52939	105912	76820	75423	97377	95621	50010	64511	57200	40020	246614	57082	98016	38473	52308	71692	47818	315565	1809917	2617	118
2022.03.10.	91664	75092	52997	106079	76914	75505	97525	95769	50084	64580	57262	40077	246884	57157	98170	38527	52347	71805	47846	316010	1812294	2499	117
2022.03.11.	91744	75224	53053	106241	77000	75589	97630	95894	50135	64630	57317	40125	247121	57244	98310	38560	52393	71883	47884	316385	1814362	2338	109
2022.03.16.	91922	75471	53140	106553	77244	75770	97927	96167	50241	64758	57445	40237	247676	57391	98605	38630	52524	72071	47927	317565	1819264	2259	101
2022.03.17.	91978	75572	53204	106656	77304	75819	98013	96244	50287	64799	57483	40266	247827	57438	98716	38676	52547	72112	47967	317859	1820767	2287	90
2022.03.18.	92109	75815	53329	106823	77447	75937	98180	96450	50371	64906	57548	40321	248220	57547	98964	38736	52619	72202	48034	318531	1824089	2205	90
2022.03.21.	92342	76209	53445	107200	319807	77719	76115	98735	96723	50503	65050	57729	40407	248848	57713	99274	38828	52756	72385	48140	1829928	2061	74
2022.03.22.	92394	76324	53496	107287	320101	77786	76172	98793	96791	50563	65098	57764	40425	249024	57763	99381	38860	52778	72442	48181	1831423	2062	78
2022.03.23.	92521	76534	53572	107477	320728	77898	76259	98954	96939	50629	65182	57825	40461	249393	57836	99547	38912	52847	72507	48247	1834268	2006	77
2022.03.24.	92642	76709	53648	107635	78002	76335	99122	97081	50678	65241	57913	40498	249690	57915	99694	38965	52903	72614	48285	321349	1836919	1971	71
2022.03.25.	92735	76850	53709	107750	78105	76441	99249	97216	50750	65312	57980	40527	250000	57995	99822	39007	52972	72675	48326	321937	1839358	1953	70
2022.03.28.	92965	77127	53872	108029	78345	76611	99521	97447	50872	65442	58092	40619	250653	58169	100066	39077	53090	72862	48418	323304	1844581	1887	60
2022.03.29.	93038	77249	53922	108112	323644	78421	76668	99605	97547	50919	65498	58146	40642	250826	58231	100212	39122	53135	72918	48456	1846311	1896	55
2022.03.30.	93298	77552	54087	108440	324965	78653	76827	99845	97822	51050	65662	58293	40720	251553	58376	100575	39222	53284	73053	48594	1849217	1873	55
2022.03.31.	93298	77552	54087	108440	78653	76827	99845	97822	51050	65662	58293	40720	251553	58376	100575	39222	53284	73053	48594	324965	1851871	1865	52
2022.04.01.	93402	77664	54154	108564	78748	76922	99945	97959	51094	65728	58343	40755	251844	58459	100703	39253	53350	73126	48631	325554	1854198	1858	56
2022.04.05.	93735	77910	54339	108853	327049	78995	77127	100244	98312	51228	65906	58473	40850	252564	58624	101049	39359	53499	73304	48739	1860159	1833	49
2022.04.06.	93897	78094	54430	108993	327731	79124	77251	100344	98476	51293	65981	58518	40887	252957	58719	101213	39413	53552	73364	48802	1863039	1785	49
2022.04.07.	94009	78213	54499	109132	328380	79226	77340	100484	98612	51327	66039	58592	40935	253303	58821	101334	39466	53614	73444	48837	1865607	1724	51
2022.04.08.	94130	78320	54563	109242	328979	79322	77421	100592	98748	51395	66103	58656	40962	253603	58909	101446	39522	53678	73520	48896	1868007	1688	50
2022.04.11.	94326	78521	54688	109457	330224	79509	77612	100830	98954	51518	66239	58784	41050	254194	59052	101674	39596	53815	73663	48958	1872664	1755	48
2022.04.12.	94371	78603	54756	109519	330528	79548	77668	100903	99019	51577	66290	58815	41067	254413	59115	101801	39642	53859	73717	48995	1874206	1800	51
2022.04.13.	94511	78763	54829	109657	331190	79641	77731	101033	99138	51647	66382	58875	41102	254784	59226	101952	39705	53955	73788	49037	1876946		
2022.04.14.	94617	78874	54886	109771	331841	79750	77844	101148	99274	51716	66453	58937	41138	255100	59310	102091	39737	54056	73857	49080	1879480		
2022.04.19.																						1560	49
2022.06.08.																						269	8
2022.06.30.																						233	5
2022.08.17.																						570	9
2022.10.19.																						1600	18
	Bács-Kiskun	Baranya	Békés	Borsod-Abaúj-Zemplén	Csongrád-Csanád	Fejér	Győr-Moson-Sopron	Hajdú-Bihar	Heves	Jász-Nagykun-Szolnok	Komárom-Esztergom	Nógrád	Pest	Somogy	Szabolcs-Szatmár-Bereg	Tolna	Vas	Veszprém	Zala	Budapest	all	Hospitalized	Ventilated
			középre	középre	középre	középre	középre	középre	középre	középre	középre	középre	középre	középre	középre	középre	középre	középre	középre	középre	középre		

== Government response ==
On 7 March 2020, national ceremonies marking the anniversary of the Hungarian Revolution on 15 March 2020 were cancelled. Other cities and towns made similar decisions. A job fair planned to be held between 18 and 19 March at the University of Technology and Economics was also postponed.

The frequency of disinfection on Budapest public transport vehicles increased, and the rule about using only the first door for boarding was suspended to decrease crowding. On 13 March 2020, similar rules regarding getting on public transport were introduced in Miskolc as well.

The National Ambulance Service provided more ambulances across the country to make easier the handling of increasing patients. 145 beds were freed for this cause in Saint Ladislaus Hospital, belonging to South Pest Central Hospital. Their capacity is now 81 rooms with 189 beds. If these filled up, other hospitals capable of handling this type of situation, would also be used for quarantine locations elsewhere in the country. On 8 March, visiting someone in a hospital or in any social institution providing a long-term stay was prohibited. Budapest Zoo and Botanical Garden as well as every thermal bath would remain closed from 16 March. Starting with the same day, BuBi may be used for 100 HUF.

On 17 March, the Surgeon General announced that the National Safety Laboratory of National Health Security Centre had successfully isolated COVID-19 from a Hungarian patient's sample, which it could use for researching vaccines from a Hungarian patient's sample, to be used for the researches and production of new vaccine in Hungary. A consortium founded by Immunology Department at Faculty of Sciences of Eötvös Loránd University, Biological Institute at Science Faculty of University of Pécs, Richter Gedeon and ImmunoGenes is involved in international biotechnological developments. Imre Kacskovics, leader of Immunology Department of ELTE said, product currently under preparation at the first phase it won't be a vaccine, it provides only passive immunity, but it won't be able to prepare the body to fight against virus. Some days after the successful isolation Bioinformatic Research Team of Szentágothay János Research Centre at University of Pécs and the virologist experts of the university found the genome of new SARS-CoV-2 human coronavirus available in Hungary.

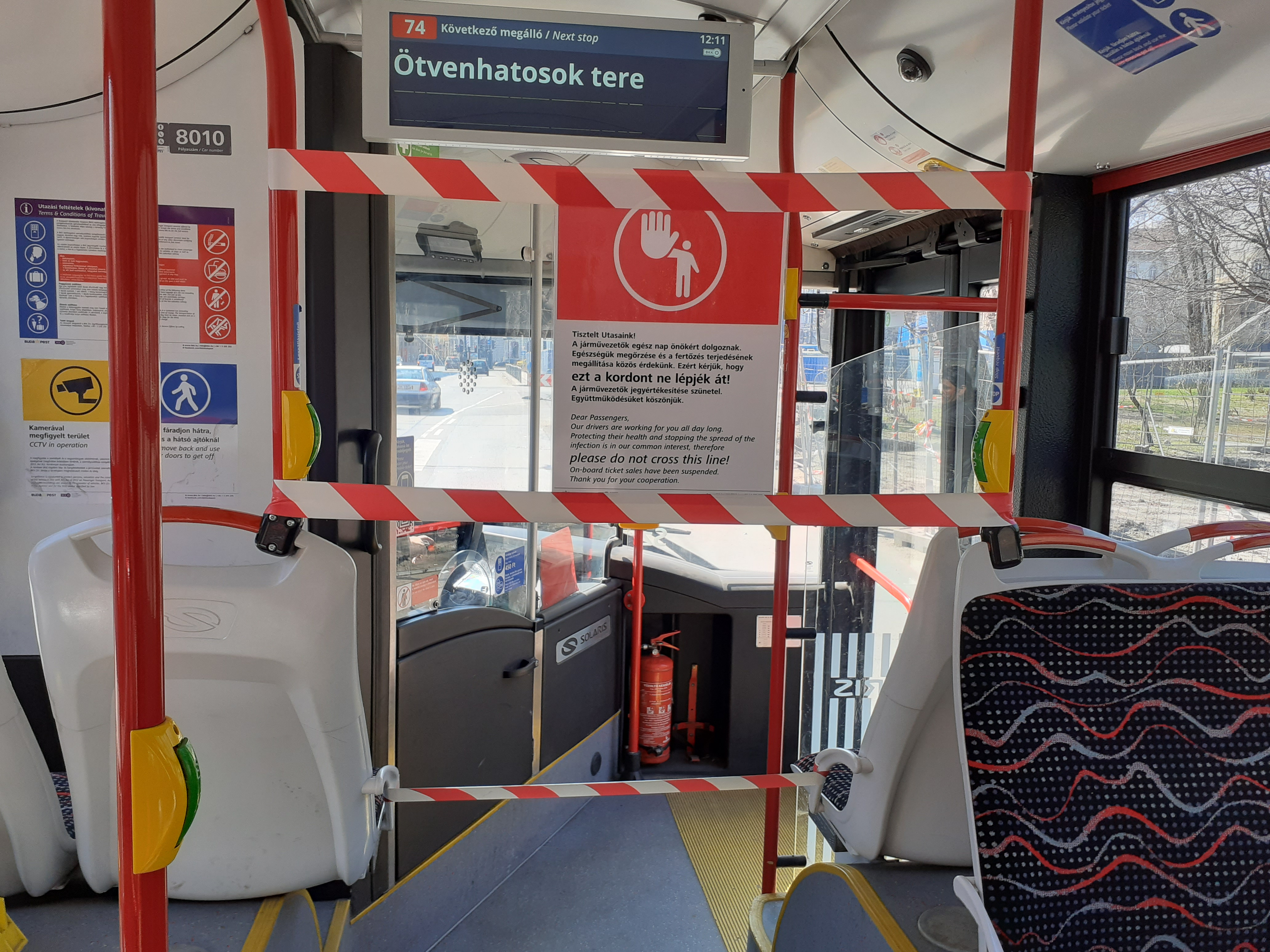
Closed area on a trolleybus in Budapest

On 19 March, Andrea Mager Minister without portfolio, responsible for National Wealth and the team led by her prepared and accepted recommendations which were the basis of economic decisions published next day.

During the fall months, the cases started to hit record numbers almost every week. Until the end of October, Orbán was against a lockdown which the country saw during the first wave. However, the course changed rapidly in November. The government implemented a curfew from midnight to 5 a.m., reintroduced the state of emergency, closed entertainment venues, further limited public events and tightened mask wearing rules. On 14 November, the country went into a new partial lockdown for 30 days. The curfew was extended to 8 p.m., gatherings were limited, stores and hairdressers had to close by 7 p.m., restaurants were only allowed to offer meals to go, hotels were not allowed to receive tourist guests, events and amateur team sport were banned, recreational facilities and institutions such as gyms, swimming pools, theatres, museums, and zoos were closed. Students above the 9th grade, university, and college students had to switch to online teaching. Kindergarten and school teachers had to be tested weekly. A few days later it became mandatory to wear a face mask in all public spaces, except for green spaces, in large cities.

On 21 May 2021, Orbán informed that the nation would lift most remaining COVID-19 restrictions, including a night-time curfew, as soon as the number of those vaccinated reaches 5 million. He also added that masks would no longer need to be worn in public, and gatherings of up to 500 people could be held in the open air. Events in closed spaces were open to those with vaccination cards. "This means we have defeated the third wave of the pandemic," Orban was quoted as saying.

=== State of emergency ===
On 11 March 2020, the Hungarian government declared a state of emergency. While these periods usually last for 15 days (after which the state of emergency must be renewed by Parliament), Minister of the Prime Minister's Office Gergely Gulyás said the measures may be in force indefinitely, as "there is a consensus that the length of this period may be not only weeks, but months." Public gatherings in an enclosed space with more than 100 people were prohibited, sporting events that could attract more than 500 spectators must be held behind closed doors, and foreign exchange programmes were suspended. Universities were ordered to suspend in-person classes and switch to online courses.

Elementary and high schools were initially excluded from closure, due to an initial assessment that COVID-19 did not have as serious of an impact to children. The Ministry of Human Capacities recommended that schools suspend field trips, open-air classes, and exchange programmes. On 13 March during a radio interview, Prime Minister Viktor Orbán said kindergarten was also excluded since parents would have to guarantee children's supervision, and teachers would be required to take unpaid leave. That evening, Orbán announced that elementary and high schools would be closed to in-person classes effective 16 March.

On 16 March 2020, Orbán announced further restrictions, including ordering the cancellation of all events, and banning restaurants and cafes from operating beyond 3 pm. Only grocery stores and pharmacies would be allowed to remain open past this time. In addition, it was announced that the country would allow entry to Hungarian citizens only. In spite of the notices issued by operational staff about responsible behaviour and moderation, a 30-year-old security guard shared fake news on YouTube regarding the pandemic. He was the subject of police action.

==== Rule by decree ====
On 30 March 2020, the National Assembly passed an act 137–53 that made the state of emergency indefinite and allowed Prime Minister Orbán to rule by decree during it. During the state of emergency, by-elections and national and local referendums must be postponed until after the conclusion of the state of emergency, and deliberate bodies of a local governments and national minority self-governments cannot be dissolved. The act also makes the deliberate distribution of misleading information that obstructs responses to the pandemic punishable by up to five years in prison, and breaking quarantine punishable by up to three.

The bill faced opposition for containing indefinite restrictions on these powers, as well as concerns over the possibility that the "fake news" prohibition in the bill could be abused for censorship of dissenting opinions towards the government's response. The Washington Post declared "Coronavirus kills its first democracy" after the legislation was passed. On 31 March 2020, liberal members of European parliament voiced concerns that the bill was incompatible with belonging to the European Union. Without mentioning Hungary, European Commission president Ursula von der Leyen advised that measures for controlling the pandemic should be "limited to what is necessary and strictly proportionate", and "not at the expense of our fundamental principles and values as set out in the treaties".

On 1 April 2020, a joint statement was issued by 13 EU member states, stating that they were "deeply concerned" about emergency initiatives violating democracy, fundamental rights, and the rule of law. The statement did not explicitly refer to Hungary; the country joined the statement the following day. On 30 April 2020, Orban's chief of staff Gergely Gulyás announced that Hungarian schools would remain closed until the end of May 2020, and events with more than 500 participants were banned until 15 August 2020.

The National Assembly abolished the state of emergency on 16 June 2020.

=== Travel and entry restrictions ===
Entry restrictions were initially targeted towards countries with large numbers of cases; the country initially began to suspend admission of migrants from its transit zones on the Serbian border, citing the outbreak in Iran. On 6 March 2020, Hungary suspended the issuance of visas to Iranian citizens. On 9 March 2020, restrictions began to emerge on air traffic from Northern Italy due to the outbreak in the country. On 11 March 2020, pursuant to the state of emergency, Hungary barred entry into the country by foreign nationals via China, Iran, Italy and South Korea. Hungarian citizens would still be allowed to return, but would be required to undergo 14 days of self-isolation upon return. Border checks were also re-implemented at the Austrian and Slovenian borders, and the government suspended travel by its employees without prior approval. On 13 March 2020, Israel was added after some cases were tied to travel to the country.

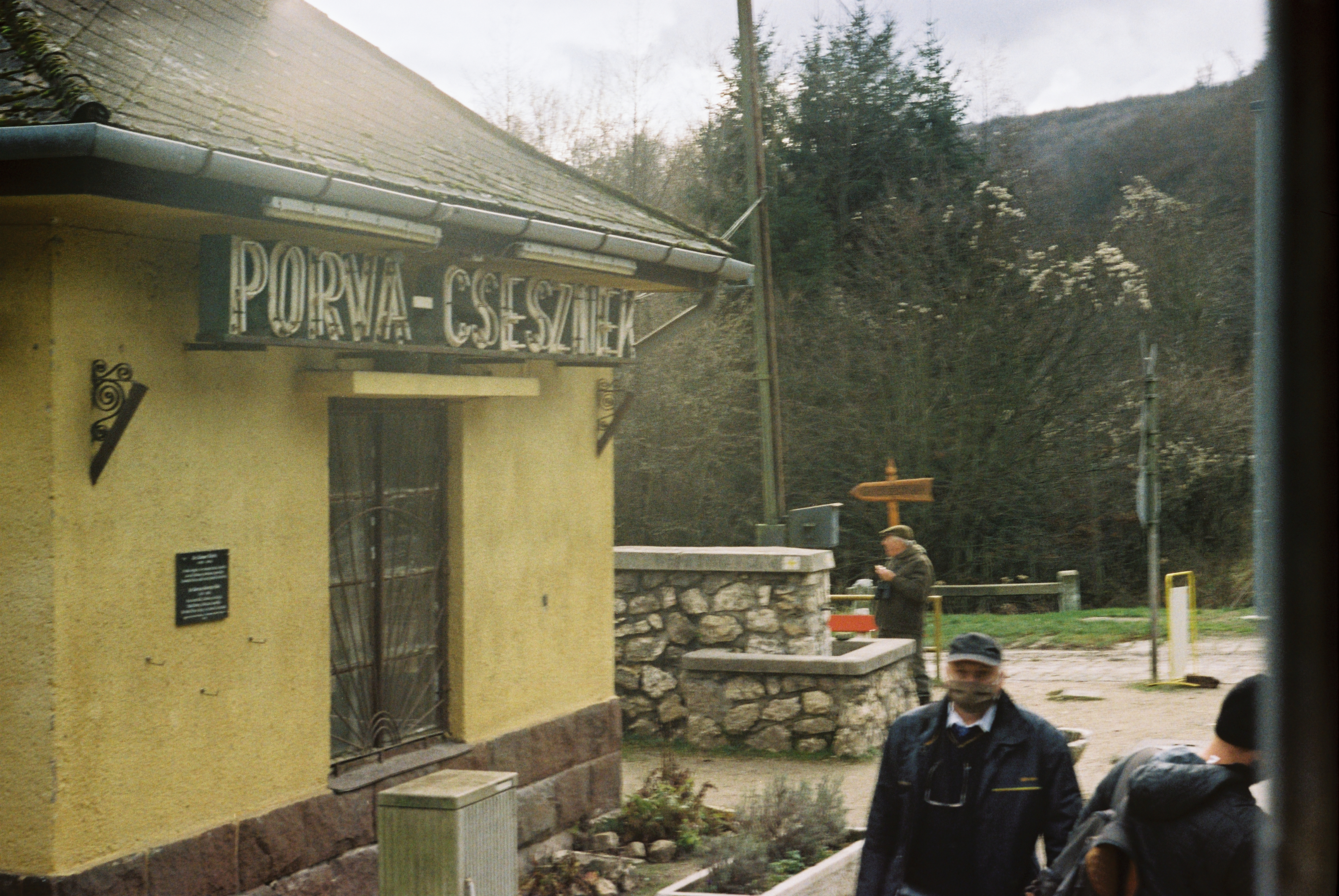
A Hungarian State Railways train conductor wearing a face mask in December 2020. From 4 May 2020 to 3 July 2021, covering the mouth and nose with a mask (scarves were accepted until September 2020) was mandatory on all means of public transport.

On 16 March 2020, Hungary restricted entry into the country to citizens only.

From 27 April 2020, wearing a mask was mandatory on public transport in Budapest.

On 28 August 2020, as cases started to rise again, Gergely Gulyás announced all borders to close as of 1 September 2020. Hungarians returning to Hungary had to provide two negative tests or go into quarantine.

=== Economic decisions for managing the emergency ===
Mihály Varga Minister of Finance said the government had to react to the real needs of the economy, and they were still waiting for the feedback from the trade and industry chamber. On 18 March during the early afternoon hours Orbán announced several upcoming decisions. Though he used his own Facebook page instead of the dedicated communication channels. The decisions were as follow:

- All due payments are suspended which are caused by loans to persons and companies. It is valid for capital and interest payment as well. This is in force up to the end of the year.
- Short-term loans for companies are prolonged up to 30 June.
- Loans delivered from 19 March may have a maximum 5% above the Hungarian National Bank's interest rate.
- Government remittedsubsidiaries due to pay based on the number of employees on the fields of tourism, catering, leisure, sport, culture and personal taxi services. Employees working in these sectors did not have to pay a pension subsidiary and the fee for receiving the benefits of the health sector is the minimum fee declared in the act.
- Taxi drivers subject to the KATA tax system are exempt from tax until 30 June.
- Rental contracts which are in connection with the above listed sectors may not be abrogated, rental fees may not be increased.
- Contribution to the development of tourism (a kind of tax) is suspended until 30 June.
- Labour rules was more flexible, to make agreements between employers and employees easier.

The Order about these changes was published in the 18 March edition of Magyar Közlöny. Mihály Varga Minister of Finance and representatives of Hungarian Banking Association had a meeting regarding actions listed above.

=== Use of vaccines from China and Russia ===
Reports in March 2021 stated that Hungary was the first country in the EU to "begin using China's Sinopharm and Russia's Sputnik V vaccines, even as polling showed that public trust in non-EU approved vaccines was low". The European Commission's Vaccine Passport plan excluded the Sputnik and Sinopharm products because they were not "EU authorised vaccines". One suggestion to resolve that issue was for "Russian and Chinese vaccine producers submit their products to the EMA for testing and authorisation". In end March 2021, Hungary also granted emergency use licenses to two more vaccines, CanSino (from China) and Covishield (produced by Serum Institute of India), but as of August 2021, neither of them were used in the national vaccination programme.

With the original orders depleted, Hungary did not offer Sputnik vaccines as of August, 2021, however, Sinopharm vaccines are still available for the country's pioneer third dose vaccination programme.

== Impact on sport ==
Nearly all sport events were affected by the state of emergency introduced on 11 March 2020. It banned all indoor events with at least 100 and every outdoor events with at least 500 participants. As a consequence the next 25th round of 2019–20 Nemzeti Bajnokság I had to be played without spectators. Only six out of 55 member states of UEFA had open matches, which were free to visit. On 16 March 2020, there was a decision made about suspension of the championship, suspending all matches.

On 11 March 2020, they ended Erste Liga 2019–2020 Hungarian ice hockey championship, which was at the semi-final stage, and the same decision was made about all other ice hockey championships in the country. All matches part of championships and cup series organised by the Hungarian Handball Association were suspended. The same decision was made by the Hungarian Water Polo Federation. Basketball and volleyball championships were also suspended. The National Swimming Championship was also prolonged. The Hungarian Boxing Association announced the evacuation of participants from London, where qualification for the 2020 Summer Olympics were ongoing. Hungarian Karate Federation announced that they temporally cancel karate contents part of the content calendar. On 13 March, the three étaps of Giro d'Italia in the country had been cancelled. On 17 March 2020, the most well-known Hungarian bicycle tour, Tour de Hongrie was postponed from May to October 2020.

Due to the state of emergency in Bulgaria, they banned all sport events in the country up to 29 March 2020. As a result, the qualifying match between Bulgaria and Hungary was postponed. On 17 March 2020, UEFA postponed the whole championship a year to 2021, which is scheduled to be held among other countries apart from Hungary.

European Karate Federation informed Hungarian Karate Federation about the cancelling European Championship that year, planned to take place in Baku from 25 to 29 March 2020. This championship is part of the qualification events to the Olympics.

== See also ==
- COVID-19 pandemic in Europe
- COVID-19 pandemic by country and territory
- COVID-19 pandemic in Austria
- COVID-19 pandemic in Croatia
- COVID-19 pandemic in Romania
- COVID-19 pandemic in Serbia
- COVID-19 pandemic in Slovakia
- COVID-19 pandemic in Slovenia
- COVID-19 pandemic in Ukraine
