= Fadd, Hungary =

Fadd
- Location of Tolna county in Hungary

- Location of Fadd
- Coordinates: 46.46651°N 18.82016°E
- Country: Hungary
- County: Tolna

Area
  - Total: 67.53 km^{2} (26.07 sq mi)

Population (2004)
  - Total: 4,529
  - Density: 67.06/km^{2} (173.7/sq mi)
- Time zone: UTC+1 (CET)
  - Summer (DST): UTC+2 (CEST)
- Postal code: 7133
- Area code: 74

Fadd is a large village in Tolna County, Hungary.

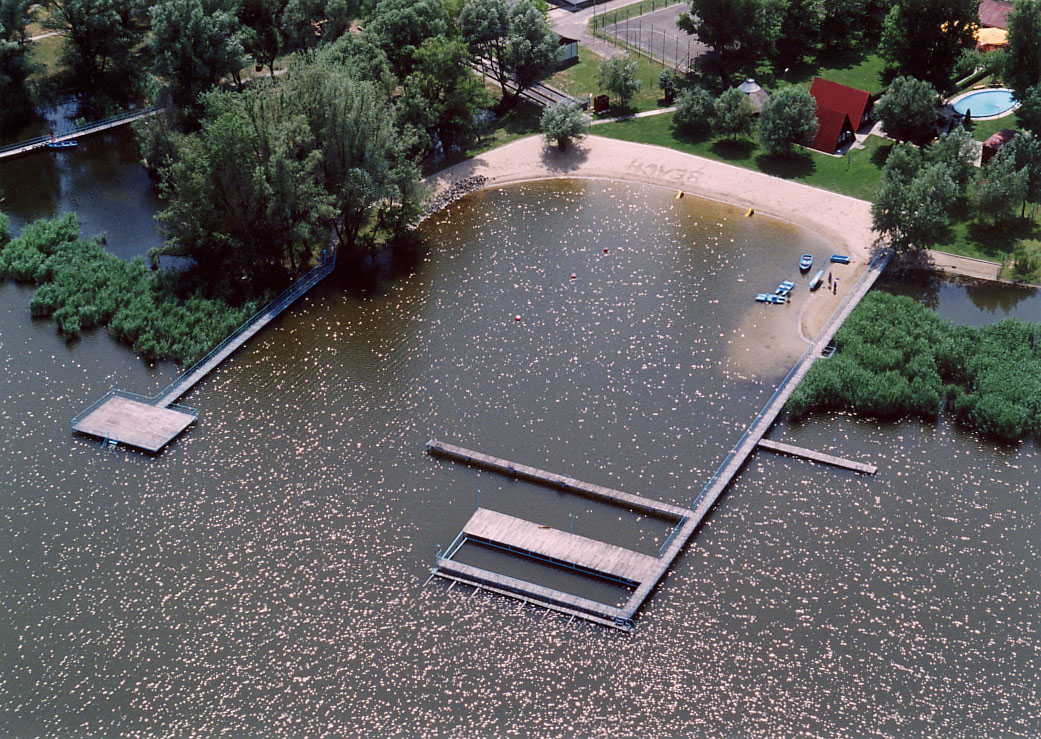
Aerial photography of a beach in Fadd
