= List of Carolingian monasteries =

This is a partial list of monasteries of the Carolingian Empire, in Western Europe around the year 800.

Abbey	Location (present-day)	Foundation date (traditional)	Founder (traditional)
Altomünster Abbey	Altomünster	before 760	Alto
Amorbach Abbey	Amorbach	734	Amor, disciple of Pirmin
Andernach Abbey	Andernach		
Annegray Abbey	La Voivre	c.585-590	Columbanus
Argenteuil Abbey	Argenteuil	656 / first mentioned 697	
Barisis-aux-Bois Abbey	Barisis-aux-Bois		
Benedictbeuren Abbey	Benediktbeuern	739/740	Lanfrid, Waldram and Eliland
Blois Abbey	Blois		
Bobbio Abbey	Bobbio	614	Columbanus
Bruyères-le-Châtel Abbey	Bruyères-le-Châtel	673	Chlotilde
Chelles Abbey	Chelles	657/660	Balthild
Condat Abbey	Saint-Claude	657/660	Romanus and Lupicinus
Corbie Abbey	Corbie	657/661	Balthild
Disentis Abbey	Disentis	700	
Dol Abbey	Dol-de-Bretagne	6th century	Samson of Dol
Echternach Abbey	Echternach	698	Willibrord
Ellwangen Abbey	Ellwangen	c. 764	Herulph and Ariolf
Faremoutiers Abbey	Faremoutiers	620	Burgundofara
Fécamp Abbey	Fécamp	c. 658	Waningus
Ferrières Abbey	Ferrières-en-Gâtinais	c. 630	Columbanus
Flavigny Abbey	Flavigny-sur-Ozerain	717	Widerad
Fleury Abbey	Saint-Benoît-sur-Loire	c. 640	Leodebaldus
Fritzlar Abbey	Fritzlar	c. 732	Boniface
Gengenbach Abbey	Gengenbach	in or after 727	Pirmin
Gorze Abbey	Gorze	c. 757	Chrodegang
Frauenchiemsee Abbey	Chiemsee	782	Tassilo III
Fulda Abbey	Fulda	744	Sturm
Hautmont Abbey	Hautmont	646?	Vincent Madelgarius
Hautvillers Abbey	Hautvillers	650	Nivard
Herbrechtingen Abbey	Herbrechtingen		
Herford Abbey	Herford	c. 800	Waltger
Herrenchiemsee Abbey	Chiemsee	782	Tassilo III
Hersfeld Abbey	Bad Hersfeld	before 744, refounded 769	Sturm, Lullus
Holy Cross Abbey	Poitiers	552	Radegunde
Holzkirchen Abbey	Holzkirchen		
Homburg Abbey	Homburg an der Unstrut		
Honau Abbey	La Wantzenau	720	Adalbert
Hornbach Abbey	Hornbach, Germany	c. 741	Pirmin
Innichen Abbey	Innichen	769	Tassilo III
Jouarre Abbey	Jouarre	630	Ado
Jumièges Abbey	Jumièges	c. 654	Philibert
Kaiserswerth Abbey	Düsseldorf-Kaiserswerth		
Kempten Abbey	Kempten	752	Audogar
Klingenmünster Abbey	Klingenmünster	626	
Kitzingen Abbey	Kitzingen		
Kochel Abbey	Kochel		
Kremsmünster Abbey	Kremsmünster	777	Tassilo III
Landévennec Abbey	Landévennec	c. 490	Winwaloe
Lérins Abbey	Île Saint-Honorat	c. 410	Honoratus
Liessies Abbey	Liessies	751	Wilbert
Lobbes Abbey	Lobbes	c. 645	Landelin
Loches Abbey	Loches		
Lorsch Abbey	Lorsch	764	Cancor
Luxeuil Abbey	Luxeuil-les-Bains	c. 590	Columbanus
Marchtal Abbey	Obermarchtal	before 776	
Marmoutier Abbey	Marmoutier	c. 590 or 659	Leobard?
Maroilles Abbey	Maroilles	c. 650	Radobert
Mazerolles Abbey	Mazerolles		
Metten Abbey	Metten	c. 766	Gamelbert
Mettlach Abbey	Mettlach	c. 676	Leudwinus
Michaelbeuern Abbey	Dorfbeuern	736	
Mondsee Abbey	Mondsee	748	Odilo
Mont-Saint-Michel Abbey	Mont-Saint-Michel	709	Aubert
Mont Sainte-Odile Abbey	Mont Sainte-Odile	c. 690	Odile
Montier-en-Der Abbey	Montier-en-Der	c. 670	Bercharius
Moutier-Grandval Abbey	Moutier, Grandval	c. 640	
Munster Abbey	Munster		
Murbach Abbey	Murbach	727	Pirmin
Nantua Abbey	Nantua	c.660	Amandus
Neustadt am Main Abbey	Neustadt am Main	738	Burchard
Niederaltaich Abbey	Niederalteich	741	Odilo
Nivelles Abbey	Nivelles	640	Gertrude
Noirmoutier Abbey	Noirmoutier	674	Philibert
Nonantola Abbey	Nonantola	752	Anselm of Nonantola
Nouaillé Abbey	Nouaillé-Maupertuis	End of seventh century	
Novalesa Abbey	Novalesa	726	Abbo
Ochsenfurt Abbey	Ochsenfurt		
Ohrdruf Abbey	Ohrdruf		
Orbais Abbey	Orbais-l'Abbaye		
Ottobeuren Abbey	Ottobeuren	764	Toto
Péronne Abbey	Péronne		
Pfäfers Abbey	Pfäfers	731	
Prüm Abbey	Prüm	721	Bertrada and Caribert
Rebais Abbey	Rebais	630/640	Audoin
Reichenau Abbey	Reichenau Island	724	Pirmin
Remiremont Abbey	Remiremont	c. 620	Romaric
Reuil-en-Brie Abbey	Reuil-en-Brie	7th century	Rado
Rheinau Abbey	Rheinau	c. 778	
Romainmôtier Abbey	Romainmôtier-Envy	c. 450	Romanus of Condat
Saint-Amand Abbey	Saint-Amand-les-Eaux	633/639	Amandus
St Andoche Abbey	Autun	592	Brunhilde
Saint-Aubin d’Angers Abbey	Angers	Before 616	Bobenus?
Saint Bavo's Abbey	Ghent	7th century	Amandus
Saint Bertin Abbey	Saint-Omer	648	Bertin
Sainte Colombe Abbey	Sens	620	Chlothar II
Saint-Denis Abbey	Saint-Denis	623/39	Dagobert I
Saint Eloi Abbey	Noyon	645	Eligius
Saint Emmeram's Abbey	Regensburg	c. 739	
St Gall Abbey	St. Gallen	1st half 8th century	Gall
Saint Genevieve Abbey	Paris	502?	Chlodowech & Saint Clotilde
Saint-Génis-des-Fontaines Abbey	Saint-Génis-des-Fontaines	First mentioned 819	
Saint-Germain-des-Prés Abbey	Paris	c. 557	Germanus
Saint Glossinde Abbey	Metz	c. 604	Glossinde
Saint-Hubert Abbey	Saint-Hubert	687	Pepin of Herstal
Saint John Abbey	Müstair	c. 780	
St. John the Great Abbey	Autun	First mentioned in 589	Syagrius of Autun
Saint Junian Abbey	Nouaillé-Maupertuis	6th century	Junian
St. Ludger's Abbey	Helmstedt	c. 800	Ludger
Saint Lucian Abbey	Beauvais	c. 585	Chilperic I?
St Martin Abbey	Autun	c. 589	Syagrius of Autun
St Maixent Abbey	Saint-Maixent-l'École	459?	Agapitus, but named after Maxentius
Saint-Maurice d'Agaune Abbey	Saint-Maurice	515	Sigismund of Burgundy
Saint-Médard de Soissons Abbey	Soissons	557	Chlothar I
Saint Mesmin Abbey	Saint-Pryvé-Saint-Mesmin	ca. 501	Euspicius
Saint Mihiel Abbey	Saint-Mihiel	708/709	Wulfoalde and Adalsinde
Saint Peter's Abbey	Ghent	7th century	Amandus
Saint Peter Abbey	Solignac	631	Eligius
Saint-Pierre de la Couture Abbey	Le Mans	before 616	Bertechramus
Saint Pierre-le-Bas Abbey	Vienne	6th century	Leonianus
Saint-Pierre-le-Vif Abbey	Sens	6th century	Theudechild
Sankt Pölten Abbey	Sankt Pölten		
Saint-Quentin Abbey	Saint-Quentin	7th century	Chlodovech II
Saint-Riquier Abbey	Saint-Riquier	625	Richarius
Saint-Sauveur Abbey	Sarlat	750	
Saint Symphorian Abbey	Metz	c. 609	Pappolus
Sint-Truiden Abbey	Sint-Truiden	c. 655	Trudo
Saint-Vaast Abbey	Arras	667	Audebert
Saint Wandrille Abbey	Saint-Wandrille-Rançon	648	Wandregisel
Schäftlarn Abbey	Schäftlarn	762	Waltrich
Schänis Abbey	Schänis	9th century	
Schuttern Abbey	Schuttern	603	Offo
Solnhofen Abbey	Solnhofen		
Staffelsee Abbey	Staffelsee	c. 740	Lanfrid, Waldram and Eliland
Stavelot-Malmedy Abbey	Stavelot, Malmedy	648	Remaclus
Susteren Abbey	Susteren	First mentioned in 711	Willibrord
Tauberbischofsheim Abbey	Tauberbischofsheim		Boniface
Tegernsee Abbey	Tegernsee	746 or 765	
Tonnerre Abbey	Tonnerre	c.800	
Weissenburg Abbey	Wissembourg	661	Dragobodo
Weltenburg Abbey	Weltenburg	c. 617	Agilus and Eustace
Werden Abbey	Werden	799	Ludger
Wessobrun Abbey	Wessobrunn	753	Tassilo III

== Sources ==
- Rosamond McKitterick, The Frankish Kingdoms under the Carolingians (1983), p. 377. This is a map, and excludes monasteries attached directly to episcopal sees.

== See also ==
- Carolingian architecture
- Carolingian art
- Carolingian dynasty
- Carolingian Empire
- Carolingian minuscule
- Carolingian Renaissance
