= Altomünster Abbey =

Monastery in Altomünster, Germany

Coordinates: 48°23′19″N 11°15′23″E

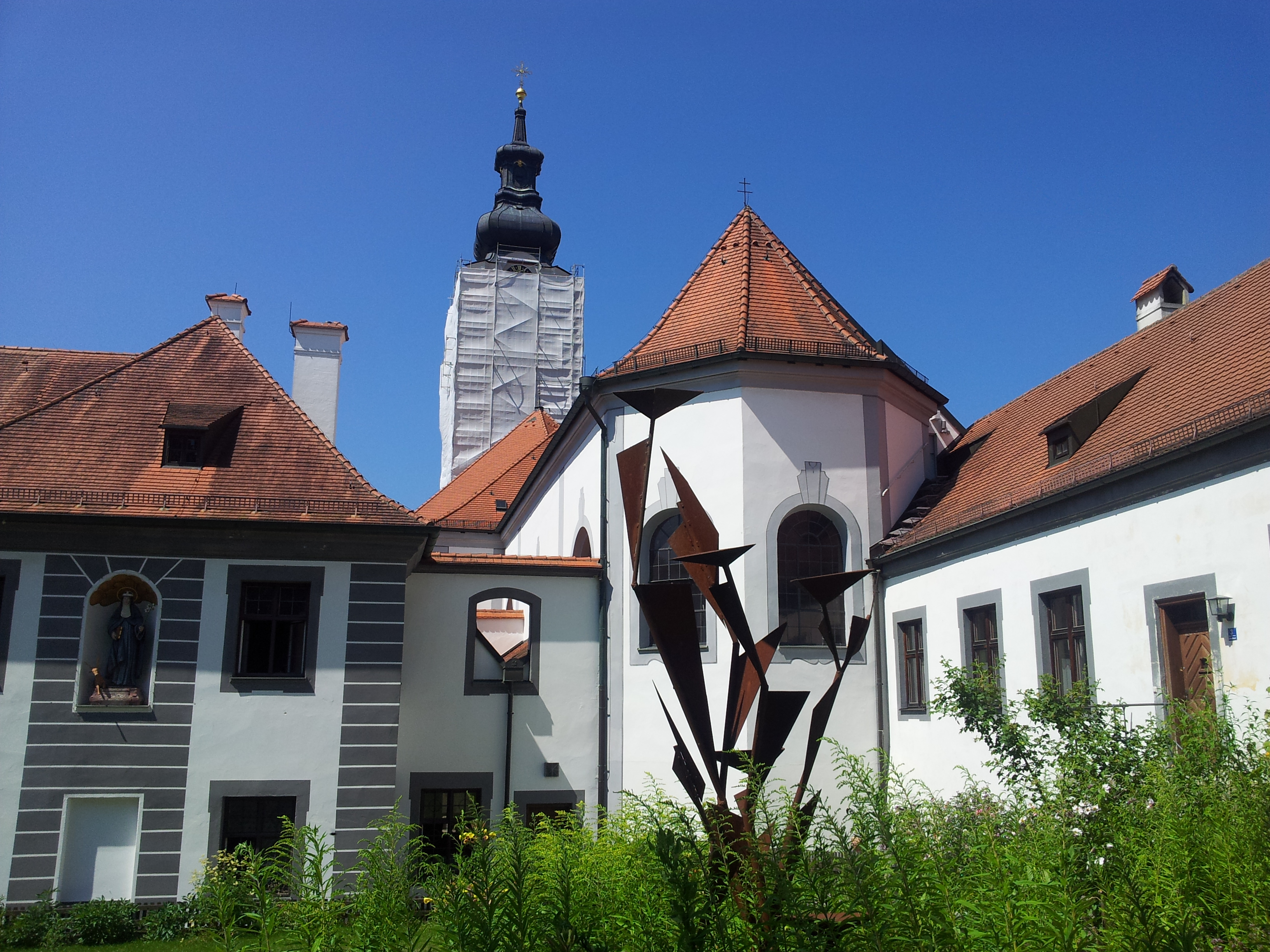
Altomünster Abbey (East side, church and convent)

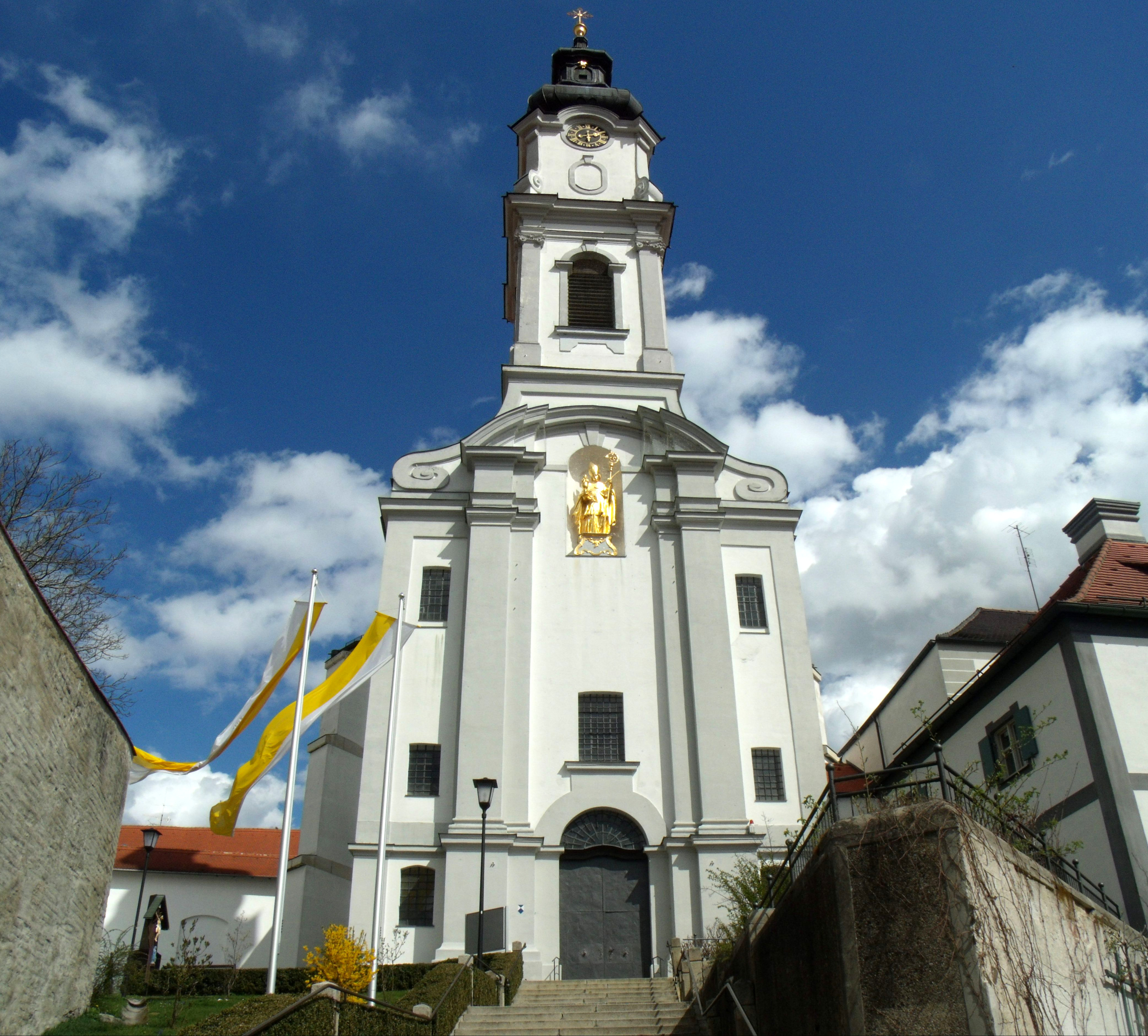
Church of St. Alto und St. Birgitta (West side)

Altomünster Abbey (Kloster Altomünster) was a monastery in the small Bavarian market town of Altomünster.

== History ==
A small monastery was founded here by and named after Saint Alto, a wandering monk, before 760. The vita of Alto, likely written by Otloh of St. Emmeram after 1056 and ostensibly based on oral knowledge (written lore having been lost through plunder), reports that the monastery was visited by Saint Boniface, who dedicated the church. Another 11th-century text notes that Boniface also dedicated the church in nearby Benediktbeuern Abbey.

Sometime before 1000 the Welfs enlarged it and made it into a Benedictine abbey. Welf I, Duke of Bavaria resettled the monks in 1056 to the newly founded Weingarten Abbey in Altdorf (now also called Weingarten), while the nuns formerly resident at Altdorf moved to Altomünster, where they lived until the monastery was dissolved in 1488 by Pope Innocent VIII.

In 1496 by grant of Duke George the Rich the Bridgettines of Maihingen were permitted to establish a Bridgettine monastery at Altomünster. The monastery was dissolved on 18 March 1803 during the secularisation of Bavaria, but was later revived. At the time of its closing, it was the last Bridgettine monastery in Germany. Nearby is a museum of the history of the Bridgettine Order.

In December 2015, it was announced that the monastery was closing for good and that both its property and library, which contains around 80 percent of all known Bridgettine books, would be transferred to the Munich diocese. It officially closed on 19 January 2017.

Two gospel lectionaries created for the abbey in the 12th century are held by the Bavarian State Library.

== See also ==
- List of Carolingian monasteries
- Carolingian architecture
