= Oroszi (surname) =

Oroszi is a surname. Notable people with the surname include:

- Beatrix Oroszi, Hungarian epidemiologist
- Terry Oroszi (born 1966), American author and scientist
