= Cecília Müller =

Hungarian physician and Chief Medical Officer of Hungary

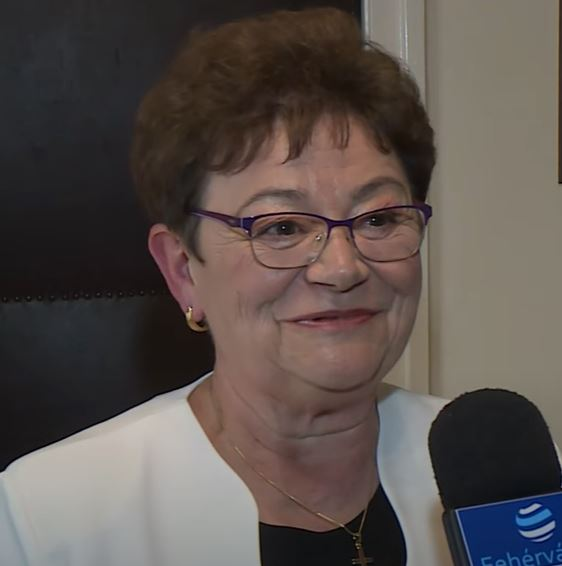

Chief Medical Officer of Hungary
- In office 1 December 2018 – 31 May 2025
- Preceded by: Attila Kovács
- Succeeded by: Surján Orsolya

Personal details
- Born: 27 November 1958 (age 67)
- Party: Independent
- Education: University of Pécs (MD)

Cecília Györgyi Müller (born 27 November 1958) is a Hungarian physician. She has served as the Chief Medical Officer of Hungary, head of NNGYK (Nemzeti Népegészségügyi és Gyógyszerészeti Központ, National Centre for Public Health and Pharmacy in English), and a member of the government's Coronavirus Taskforce.

== Biography ==
She attended medical school at the University of Pécs and graduated in 1984 cum laude. She holds four professional degrees including public health, occupational medicine, preventive medicine and primary care medicine.

Müller began her career at Szent Pantaleon Hospital. Then she worked as an occupational physician. From 1991 to 1996 Müller worked as a primary care physician in Nagyvenyim. After that she became Health Commissioner of Dunaújváros. In 2010, as Health Commissioner for the Central Transdanubia region, she was responsible for the cleanup of the Ajka alumina plant accident for which she later received a ministerial award from Sándor Pintér, Interior Minister of Hungary.

Müller later worked as the head of the Public Health Department of Fejér County Government Office. Then, she was named head of the former NNK and Chief Medical Officer of Hungary.

In 2020, she has worked as a member of the government's Coronavirus Taskforce. As chief medical officer, she has been a regular participant in the government's press conferences on the pandemic.

Since 2009, she has been a pastoral assistant at Our Lady Parish in Nagyvenyim.

In June 2025, Müller retired as Chief Medical Officer of Hungary, and was replaced by Orsolya Surján.

== Honors ==
- Honvédelemért Kitüntető Cím (I. class; 2013)
- Honorary citizen of Nagyvenyim (2015)
- Fenyvessy Memorial Award (2015)
- Prize for Public Health (2015)
