= Flesselles =

Flesselles can refer to:

- The town of Flesselles, Somme, in France
- Jacques de Flesselles (1721 – 14 July 1789), provost of Paris assassinated during the storming of the Bastille
  - The Flesselles balloon, 1784 of Joseph Montgolfier, named after the above as promoter of the subscription list.
