= Conrad of Ottobeuren =

German abbot

Blessed Conrad of Ottobeuren OSB.

Abbot
- Born: 12th century
- Residence: Ottobeuren Abbey
- Died: 27 July 1227
- Honored in: Catholic Church
- Beatified: 1555
- Major shrine: Basilica of St Alexander of Rome and Theodore Tiron
- Feast: 27 July
- Major works: Gnadenkreuz

Blessed Conrad of Ottobeuren OSB, (12th century – 27 July 1227), was abbot of Ottobeuren from 1191 until his death.

== Life ==
He was elected abbot in 1191 and held the office for the next 34 years. During his abbacy, he rebuilt the monastery twice. He was able to accomplish a first reconstruction to remedy the burnt down which had burned down under Abbot Isingrin (1145-1180). His work was destroyed again by a fire in 1217, which ravaged the entire monastery and part of the market town of Ottobeuren. Another renovation became necessary. In 1204-1205, he was the first abbot of Ottobeuren to be awarded the right to officiate with pontificalia; this privilege was extended to every abbot of Ottobeuren in 1238. In 1205, the third church was consecrated by Otto II, the bishop of Freising. He died in 1227.

== Burial and veneration ==
His body was buried in his church in front of the altar of St. John the Evangelist, where he remained until 1555. He was then buried in the new Kindelmann church in front of the altar of St. Mary. Since 1772 he has been buried together with Rupert I in the epitaph at the St. Anthony altar in the abbey church, where in 1918 his remains received a new shrine.
