= Ottobeuren Abbey =

Benedictine abbey

Coordinates: 47°56′29″N 10°17′53″E

- Reichsabtei Ottobeuren
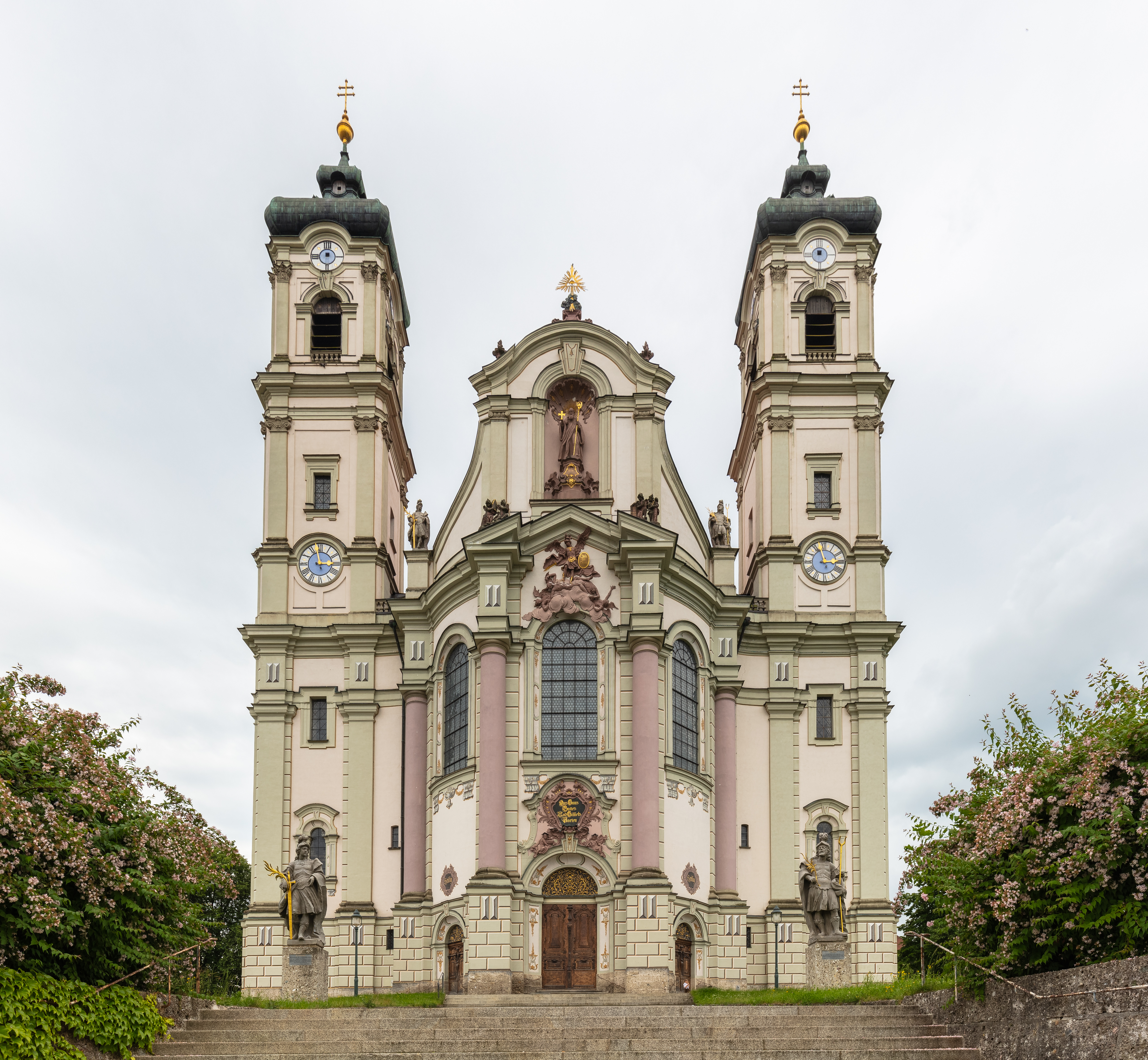
- The façade of the basilica, designed by Johann Michael Fischer, has been hailed as a pinnacle of Bavarian Baroque architecture.
- Interactive map of Ottobeuren Abbey

Monastery information
- Order: Benedictine
- Established: 764

People
- Important associated figures: Ulrich of Augsburg

Site
- Location: Ottobeuren, Germany

Ottobeuren is a Benedictine abbey, located in Ottobeuren, near Memmingen in the Bavarian Allgäu, Germany.

For part of its history Ottobeuren Abbey was one of the approximately 40 self-ruling imperial abbeys of the Holy Roman Empire and, as such, was a virtually independent state. At the time of its dissolution in 1802, the imperial abbey covered 266 square kilometers and had about 10,000 subjects.

== First foundation ==
It was founded in 764 by Toto, and dedicated to Alexander of Bergamo, the martyr. Of its early history little is known beyond the fact that Toto, its first abbot, died about 815 and that Ulrich of Augsburg was its abbot in 972. In the 11th century its discipline was on the decline, until Abbot Adalhalm (1082–94) introduced the Hirsau Reform. The same abbot began a restoration of the decaying buildings, which was completed along with the addition of a convent for noble women, by his successor, Abbot Rupert I (1102–45). Under the rule of the latter the newly founded Marienberg Abbey was recruited with monks from Ottobeuren. His successor, Abbot Isengrim (1145–80), wrote Annales minores and Annales majores.

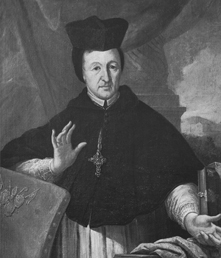
Abbot Rupert Ness

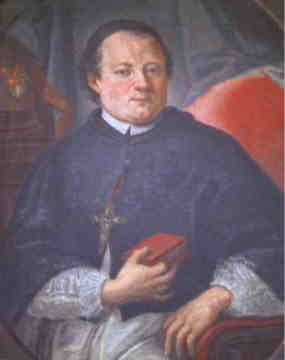
Abbot Anselm Erb

Conrad of Ottobeuren was abbot from 1193 until his death in 1227. He is described by the Benedictines as a "lover of the brethren and of the poor".

In 1153, and again in 1217, the abbey was consumed by fire. In the 14th and 15th centuries it declined so completely that at the accession of Abbot Johann Schedler (1416–43) only six or eight monks were left, and its annual revenues did not exceed 46 silver marks. Under Abbot Leonard Wiedemann (1508–46) it again began to flourish: he erected a printing establishment and a common house of studies for the Swabian Benedictines. The latter, however, was soon closed, owing to the ravages of the Thirty Years' War.

Ottobeuren became an imperial abbey in 1299, but lost this status after the prince-bishop of Augsburg had become Vogt of the abbey. These rights were renounced after a court case at the Reichskammergericht in 1624. Within months of his election in 1710, the new abbot, Rupert Ness (Rupert II, 1710–1740), the son of a master blacksmith, succeeded in solving the centuries-old dispute over jurisdiction by paying 30,000 guldens to the prince-bishop of Augsburg for his renouncing the protection vogtei over the abbey, thus allowing Ottobeuren to regain its full status as an independent imperial abbey, although it did not become a member of the Swabian Circle. The War of the Spanish Succession not being yet over at the time, Rupert arranged to meet Emperor Charles VI who still occupied Bavaria, as well as Prince Eugene and the Duke of Marlborough who were operating in the area.

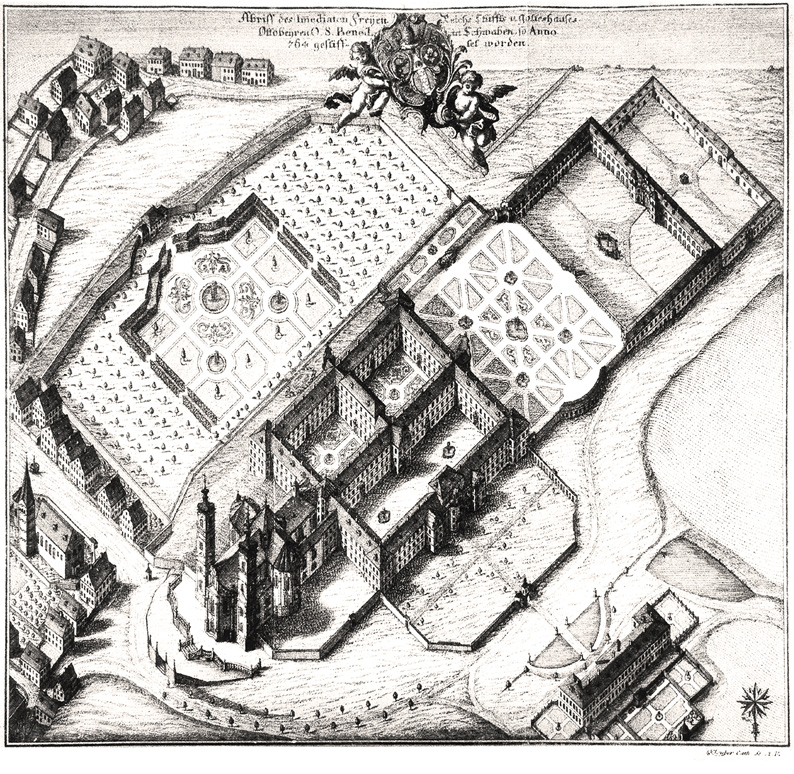
Bird's eye view of the abbey in 1766

Rupert ushered in the most flourishing period in the history of Ottobeuren, which lasted until its secularization in 1802. In the zenith of its glory, Ottobeuren fell victim to the German mediatization along with all the other imperial abbeys of the Holy Roman Empire. On 1 December 1802 Ottobeuren was secularized and its territory annexed to Bavaria. At the time, the territory of the imperial abbey covered 266 square kilometers and had about 10,000 inhabitants.

=== The abbey ===
From 1711–1725, Rupert erected the present monastery, the architectural grandeur of which has merited for it the name of "the Swabian Escorial", attesting to the economic significance of the abbey. It was famous for its book illuminations. The abbey library features stucco ceilings by Johann Baptist Zimmermann and ceiling paintings by Elias Zobel.

In 1737 Rupert also began the building of the present church, completed by his successor, Anselm Erb, in 1766.

=== Basilica ===
The church was named a minor basilica by Pope Pius XI in 1926.

== Monks ==
=== List of abbots ===
- Toto (764–814)
- Milo (814–864)
- Neodegar (864–869)
- Witgar (869–902)
- Birtilo (902–941)
- Adalbero (941–972)
- Ulrich of Augsburg (972–973)
- Rudung (973–1000)
- Dangolf (1000–1012)
- Sigibert (1012–1028)
- Embricho (1028–1050)
- Eberhard (1050–1069)
- Razelin (1069–1082)
- Adalhelm (1082–1094)
- Gebhard (1094–1100)
- Heinrich I (1100–1102)
- Rupert I (1102–1145)
- Isingrim (1145–1180)
- Bernold (1180–1194)
- Conrad I (1194–1227)
- Berthold I (1227–1246)
- Walther (1246–1252)
- Heinrich II (1252–1258)
- Siegfried (1258–1266)
- Heinrich III von Bregenz (1266–1296)
- Conrad II (1296–1312)
- Heinrich IV (1312–1322)
- Heinrich V von Nordholz (1322–1353)
- Johann I von Altmannshofen (1353–1371)
- Ulrich von Knöringen (1371–1378)
- Johann II von Hocherer (1378–1390)
- Heinrich VI (1390–1399)
- Johann III von Affstetten (1399–1400)
- Johann IV Russinger (1400–1404)
- Eggo Schwab (1404–1416)
- Johann V Schedler (1416–1443)
- Jodok Niederhof (1443–1453)
- Johann VI Kraus (1453–1460)
- Wilhelm von Lustenau (1460–1473)
- Nikolaus Röslin (1473–1492)
- Matthäus Ackermann (1492–1508)
- Leonhard Wiedemann (1508–1546)
- Kaspar Kindelmann (1547–1584)
- Gallus Memminger (1584–1599)
- Alexander Sauter (1600–1612)
- Gregor Reubi (1612–1628)
- Andreas Vogt (1628–1633)
- Maurus Schmid (1633–1655)
- Petrus Kimmicher (1656–1672)
- Benedikt Hornstein (1672–1688)
- Gordian Scherrich (1688–1710)
- Rupert Neß (Rupert II; 1710–1740)
- Anselm Erb (1740–1767)
- Honorat Goehl (1767–1802)
- Paulus Alt (1802–1807)
- Priors:
  - Barnabas Huber (1834–1851)
  - Theodor Gangauf (1851–1859)
  - Raphael Mertl (1859–1889)
  - Eugen Gebele (1889–1903)
  - Theobald Labhardt (1903–1915)
  - Placidus Glogger (1915–1918)
- Placidus Glogger (1918–1920)
- Josef Maria Einsiedler (1920–1947)
- Vitalis Maier (1948–1986)
- Vitalis Altthaler (1986–2002)
- Paulus Maria Weigele (2002–2013)
- Johannes Schaber (since 2013)

=== Other notable monks ===
Noteworthy among monks of Ottobeuren are:

- Nicolas Ellenbog, humanist, d. 1543
- Jacob Molitor, the learned and saintly prior, d. 1675
- Albert Krey, the hagiographer, d. 1713
- Augustine Bayrhamer, d. 1782, historian
- Maurus Feyerabend, d. 1818, historian
- Ulric Schiegg, the mathematician and astronomer, d. 1810.

== Second foundation ==
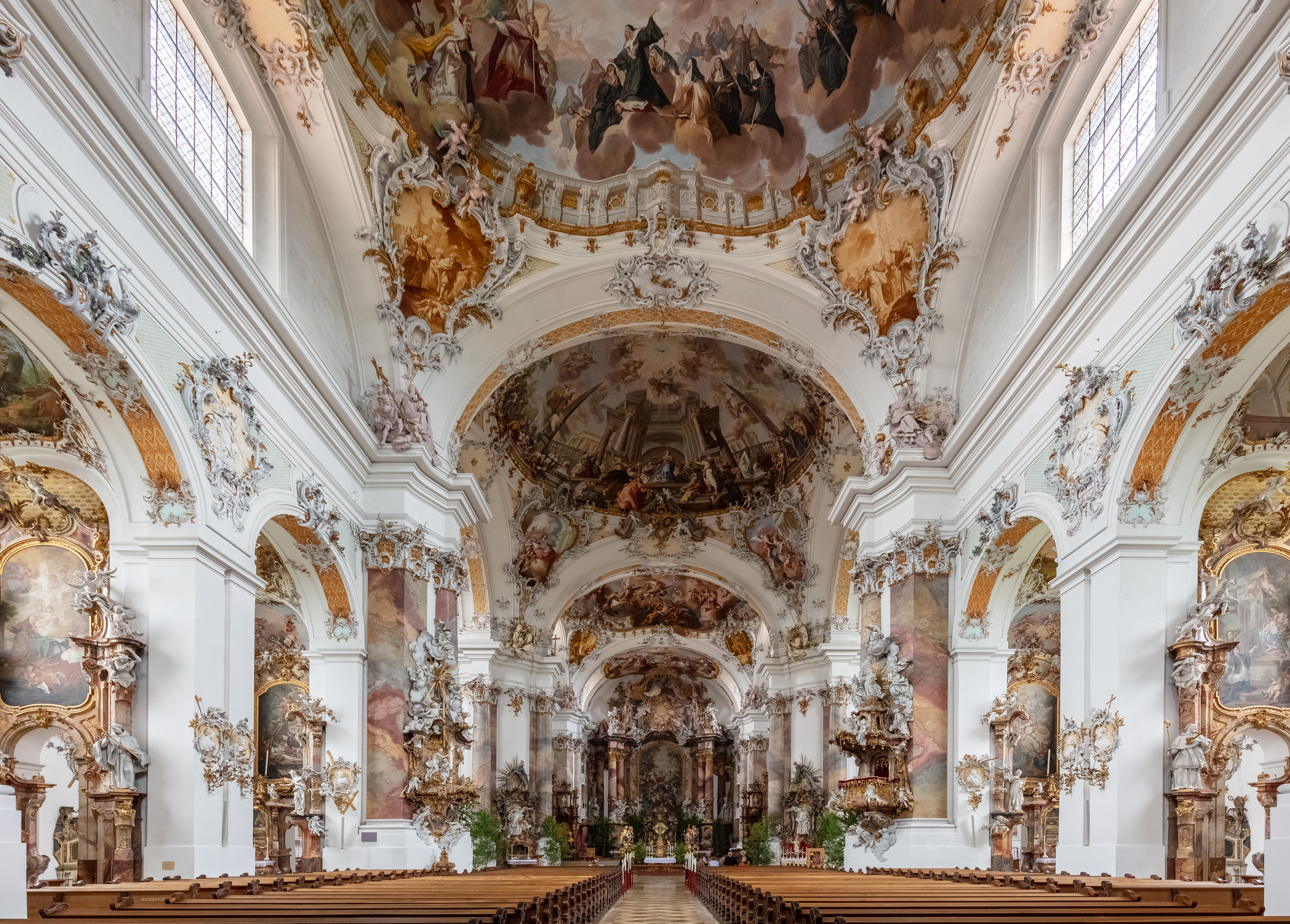
Rococo interior of the basilica

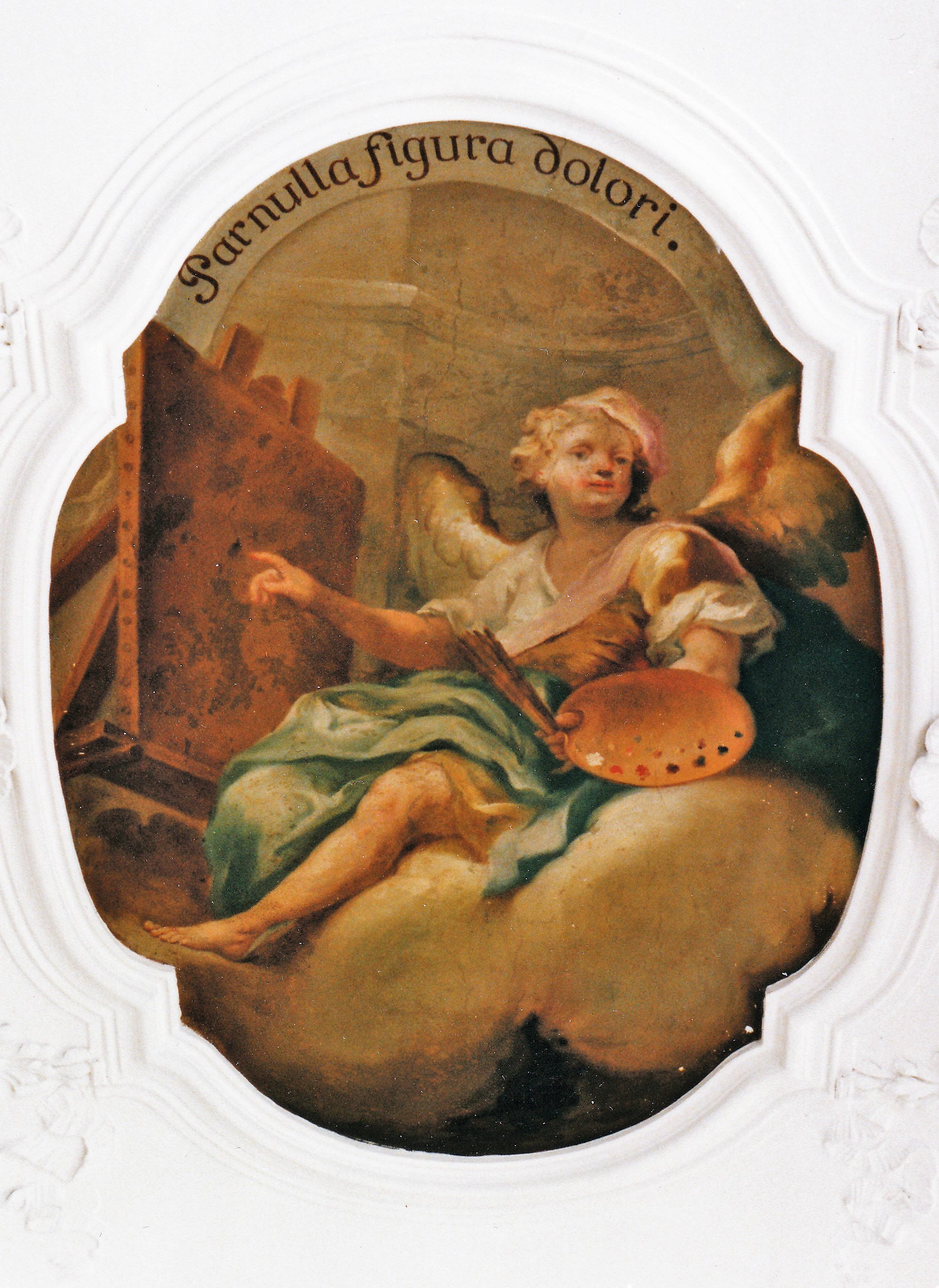
PAR NULLA FIGURA DOLORI

In 1834 King Ludwig I of Bavaria restored it as a Benedictine priory, dependent on St. Stephen's Abbey, Augsburg. The priory had care of a large parish and an industrial school of sixty or seventy orphans whom the lay brothers instructed in various trades. It was granted the status of an independent abbey in 1918.

As of 1910, the community consisted of five fathers, sixteen lay brothers, and one lay novice, who had under their charge the parish of Ottobeuren, a district school, and the industrial school for poor boys.

Ottobeuren has been a member of the Bavarian Congregation of the Benedictine Confederation since 1893.

== Music ==
Ottobeuren Abbey has one of the richest music programs in Bavaria, with concerts every Saturday. Most concerts feature one or more of the abbey's famous organs. The old organ, the masterpiece of French organbuilder Karl Joseph Riepp (1710–75), is actually a double organ; it is one of the most treasured historic organs in Europe. It was the main instrument for 200 years, until 1957 when a third organ was added by G. F. Steinmeyer & Co., renovated and augmented in 2002 by Johannes Klais, making 100 stops available on five manuals (or keyboards).

== Gallery ==
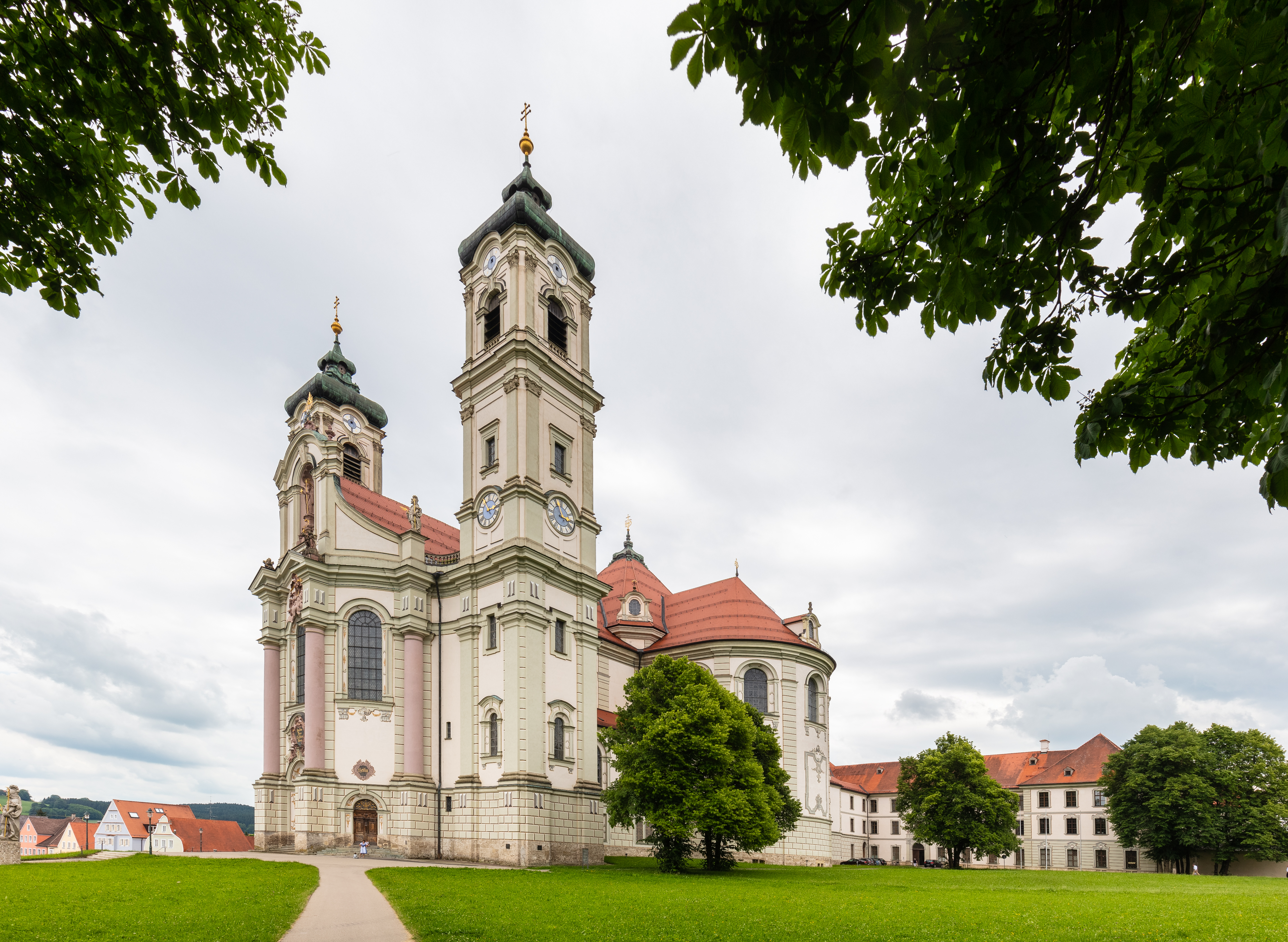
Facade

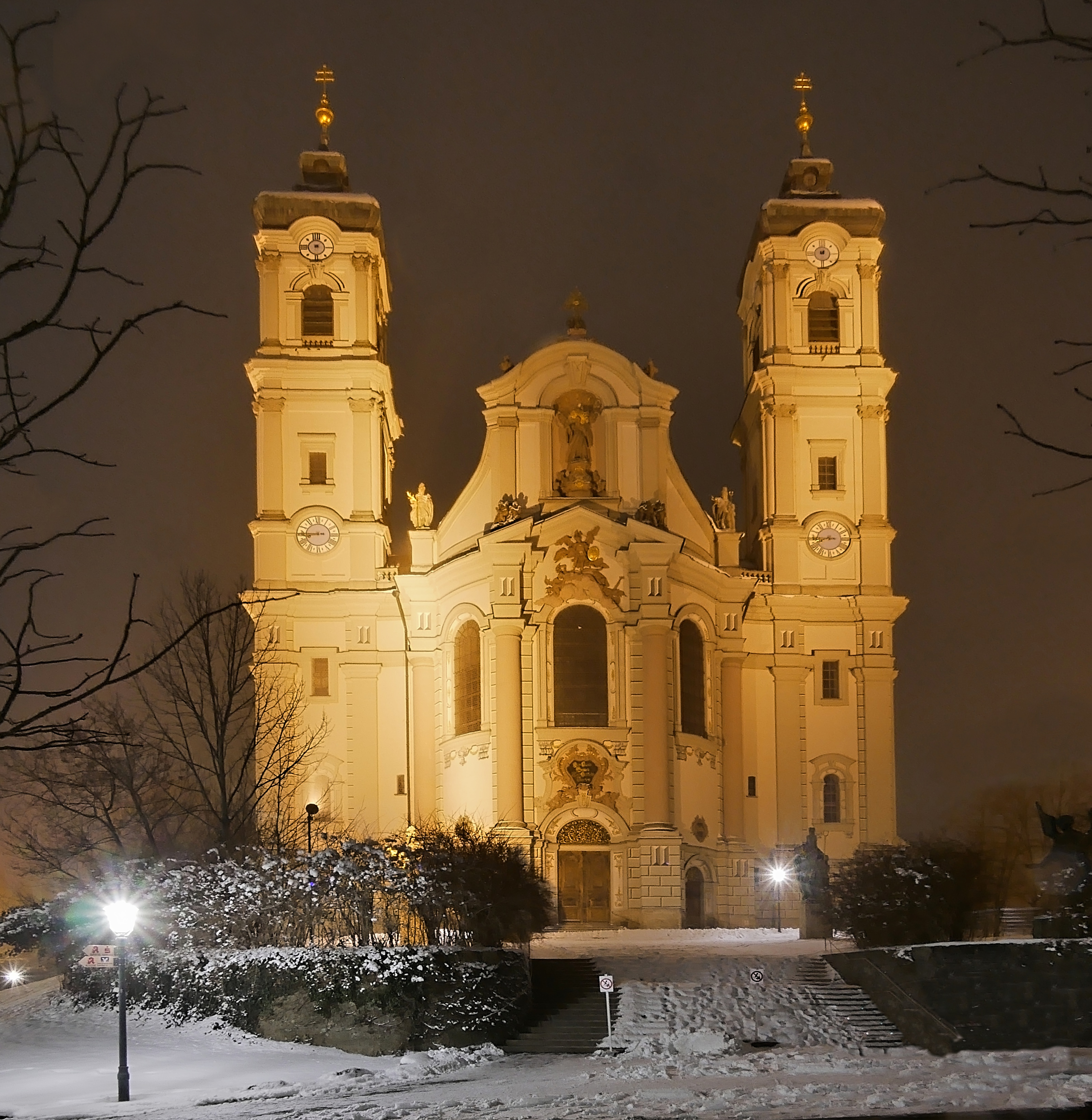
Facade at night

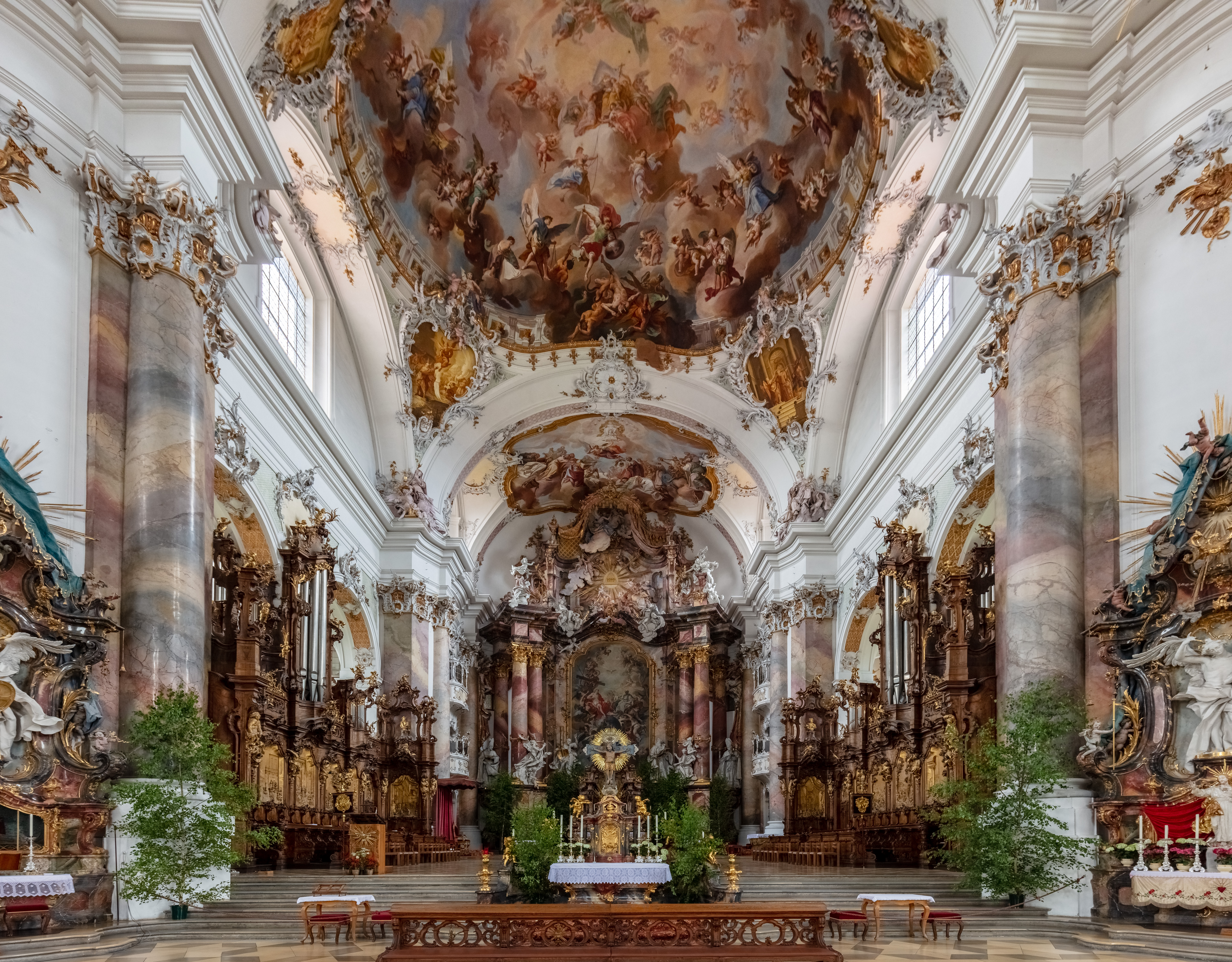
High altar

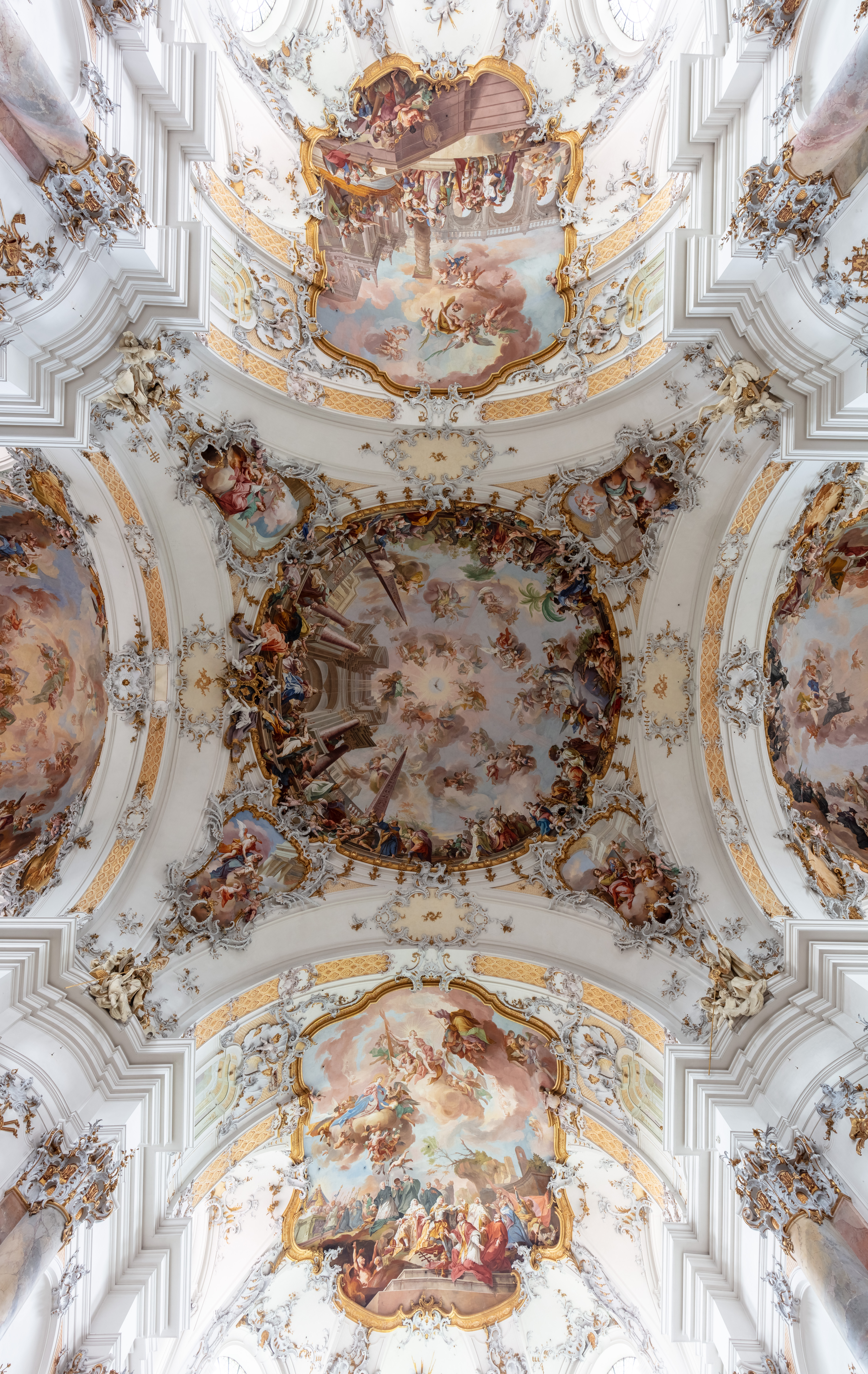
Ceiling

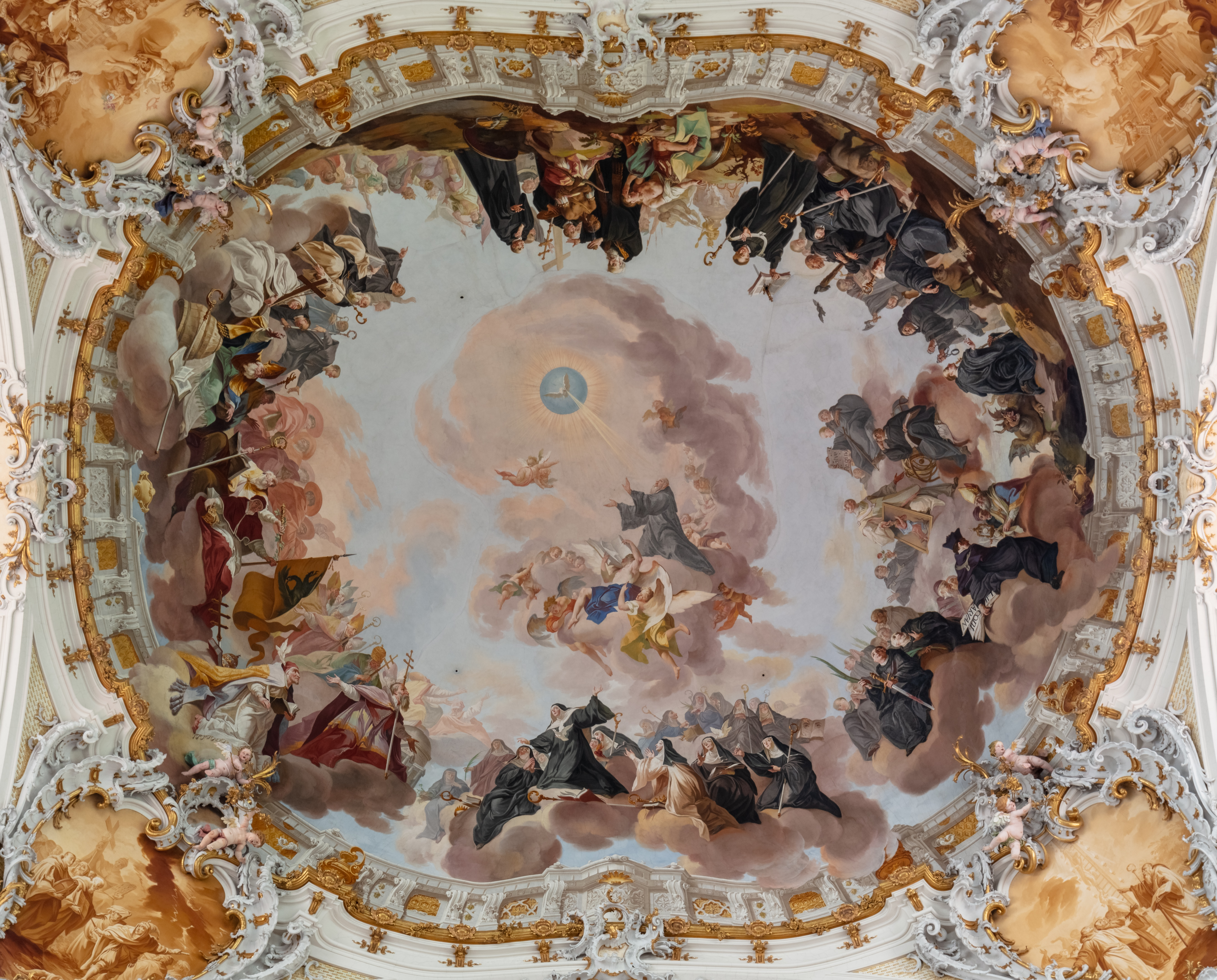
Baroque fresco

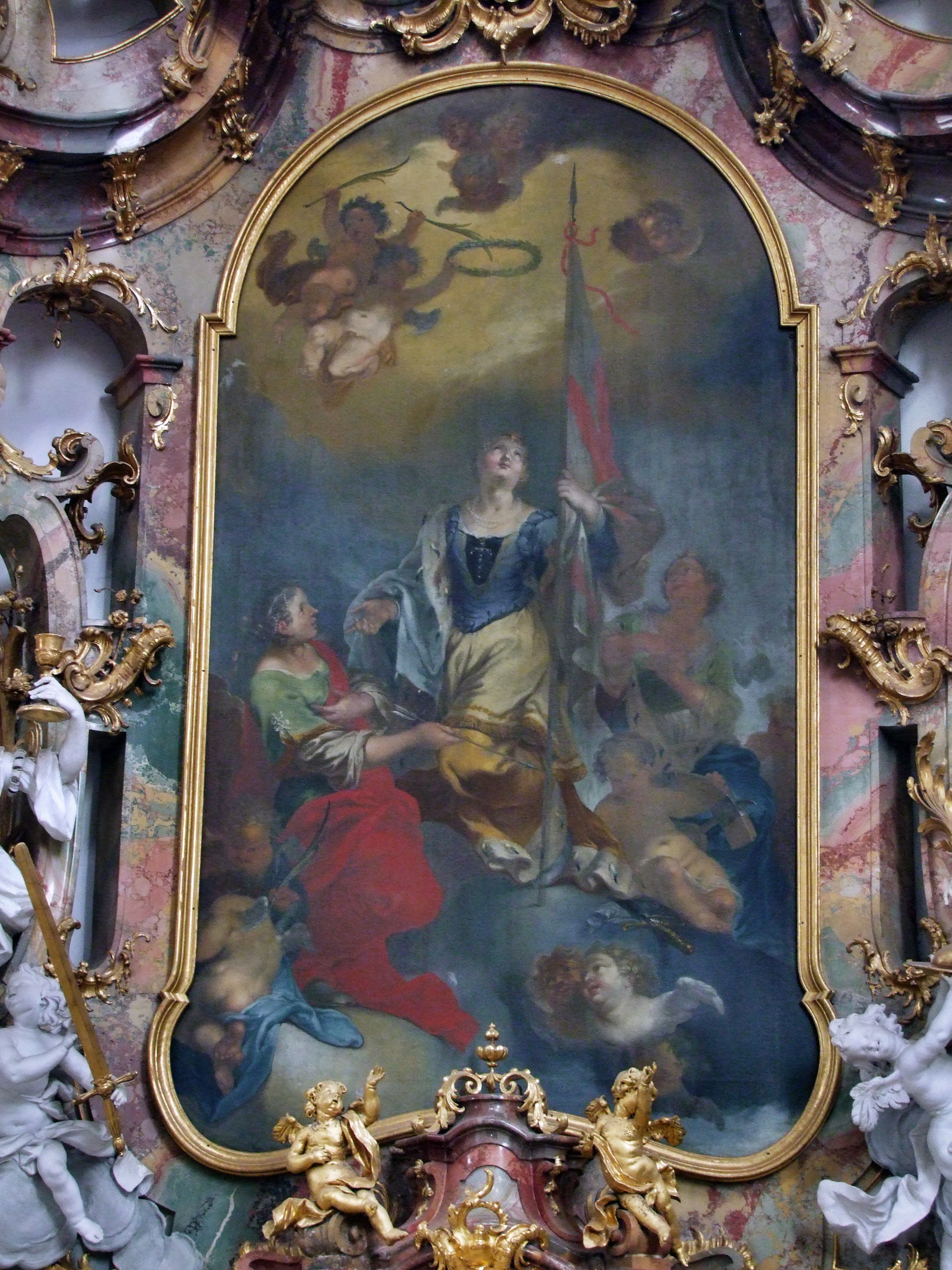
Baroque painting

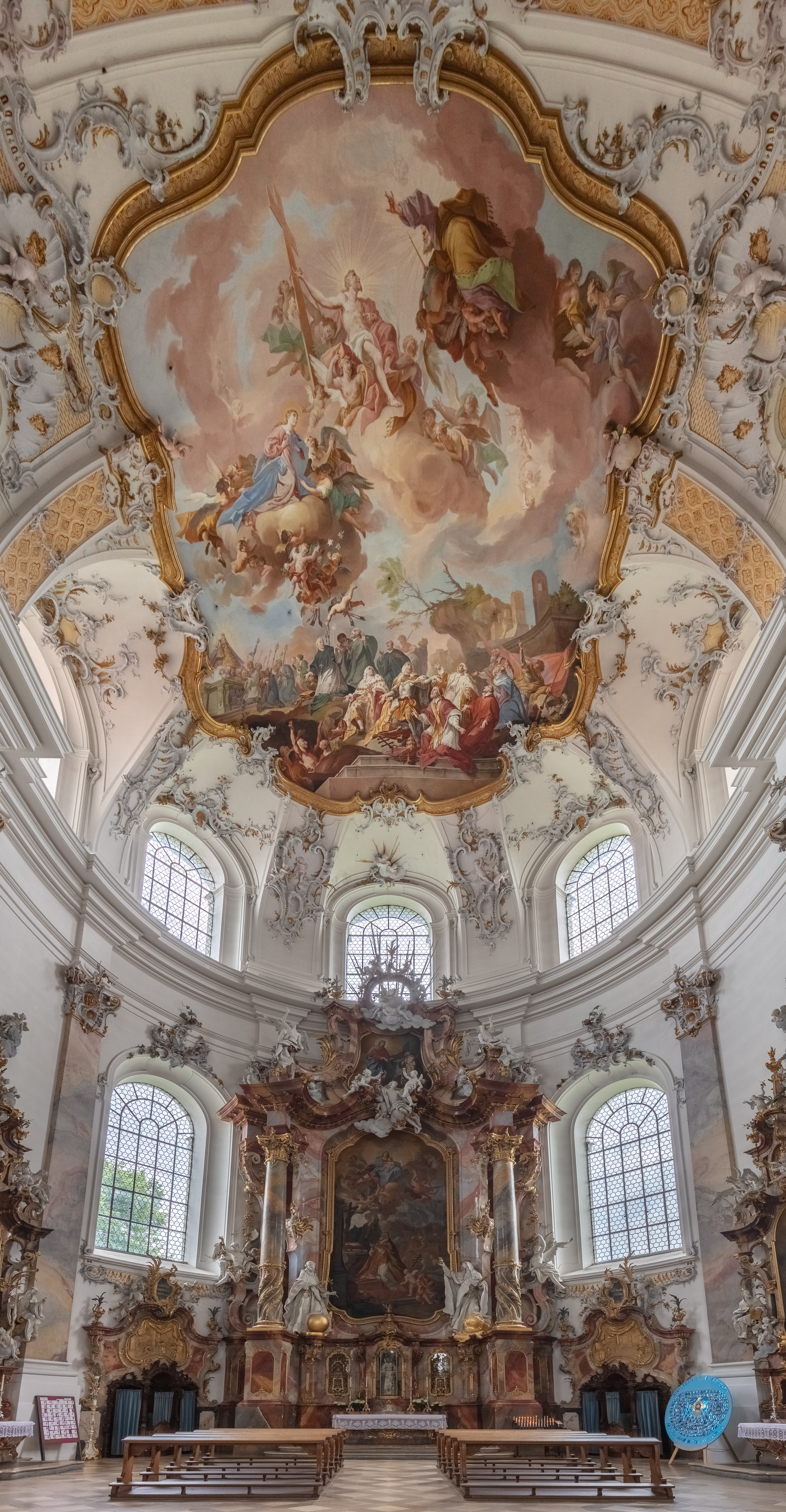
Baroque altar

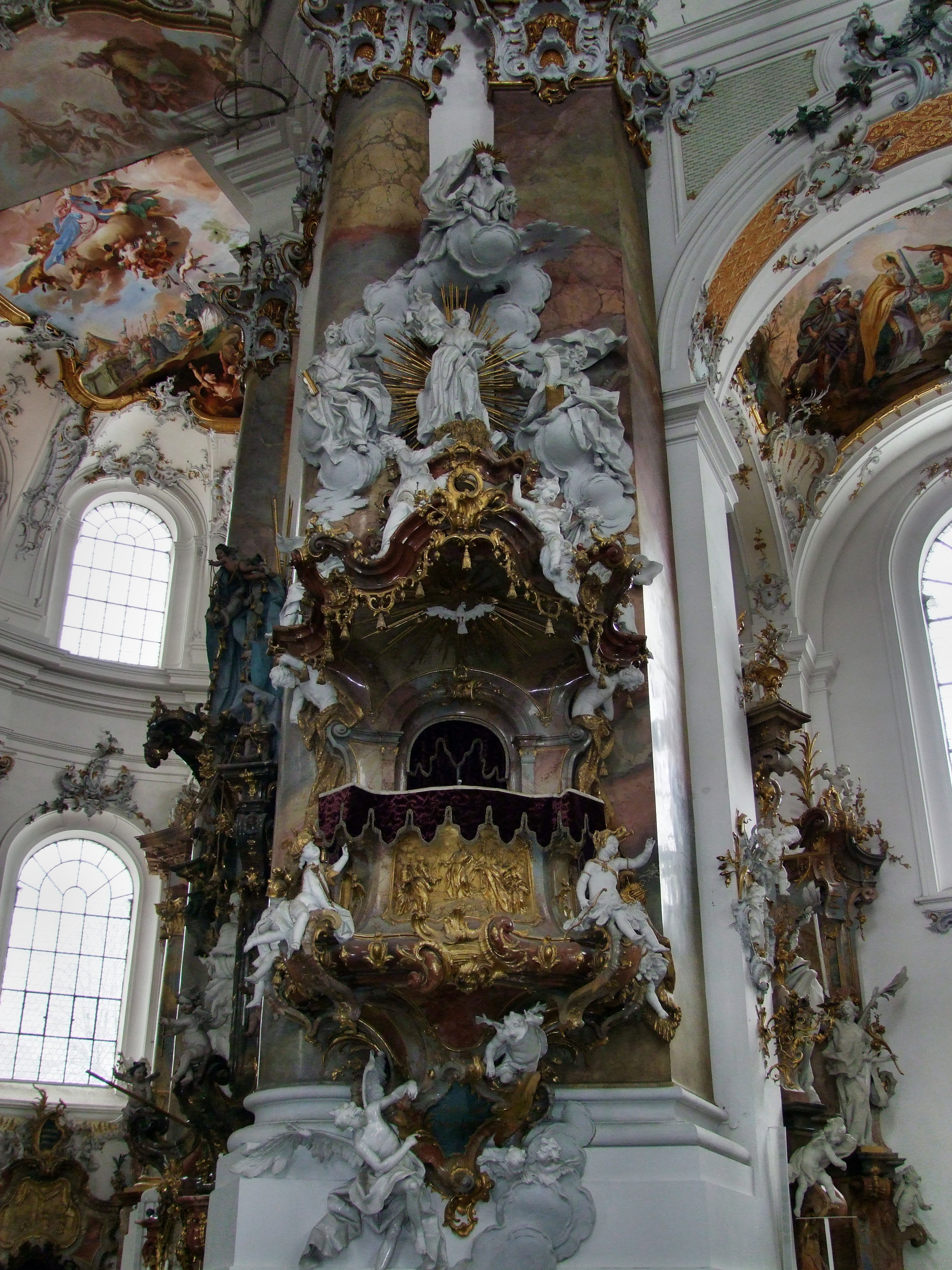
Baroque pulpit

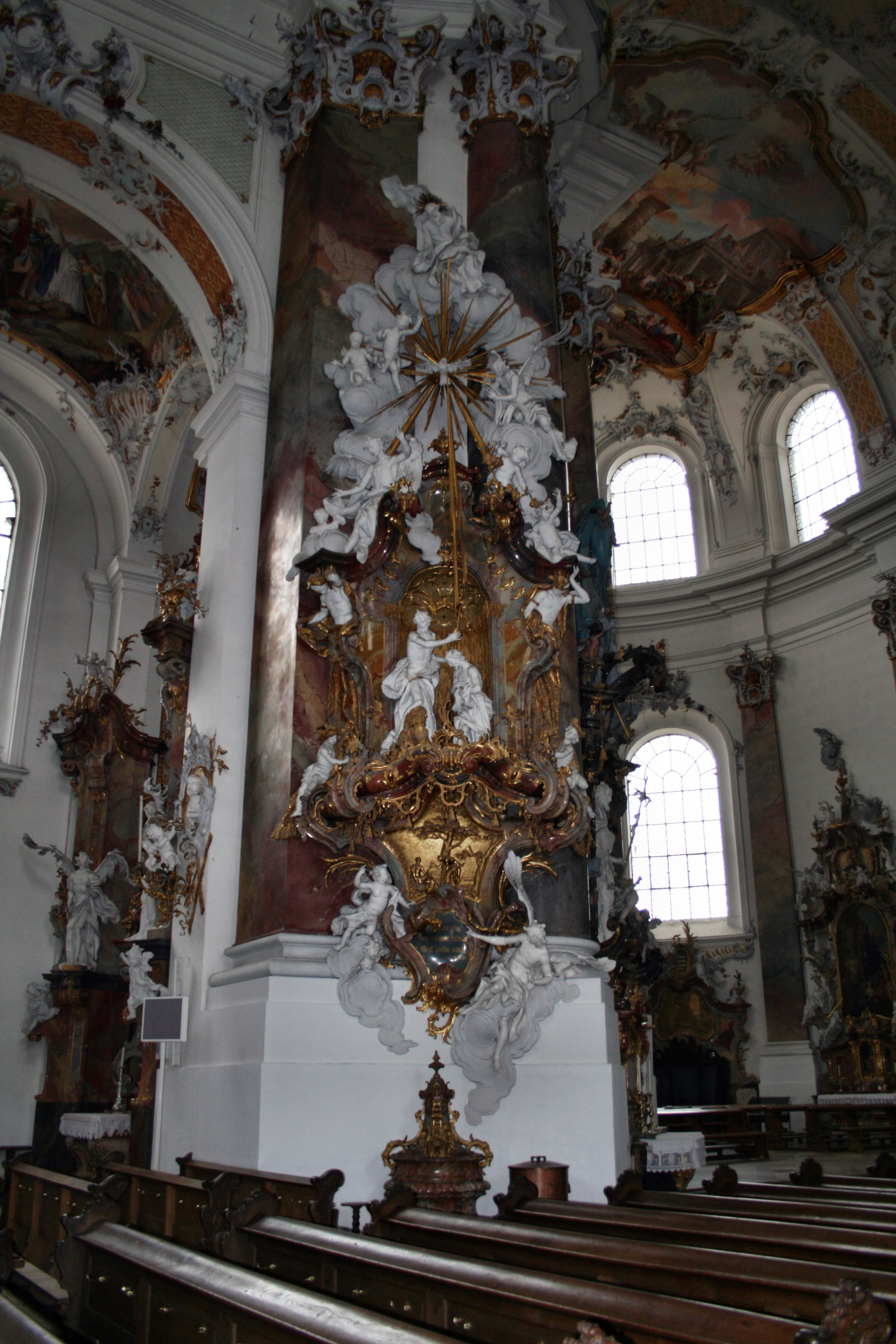
Baptismal font

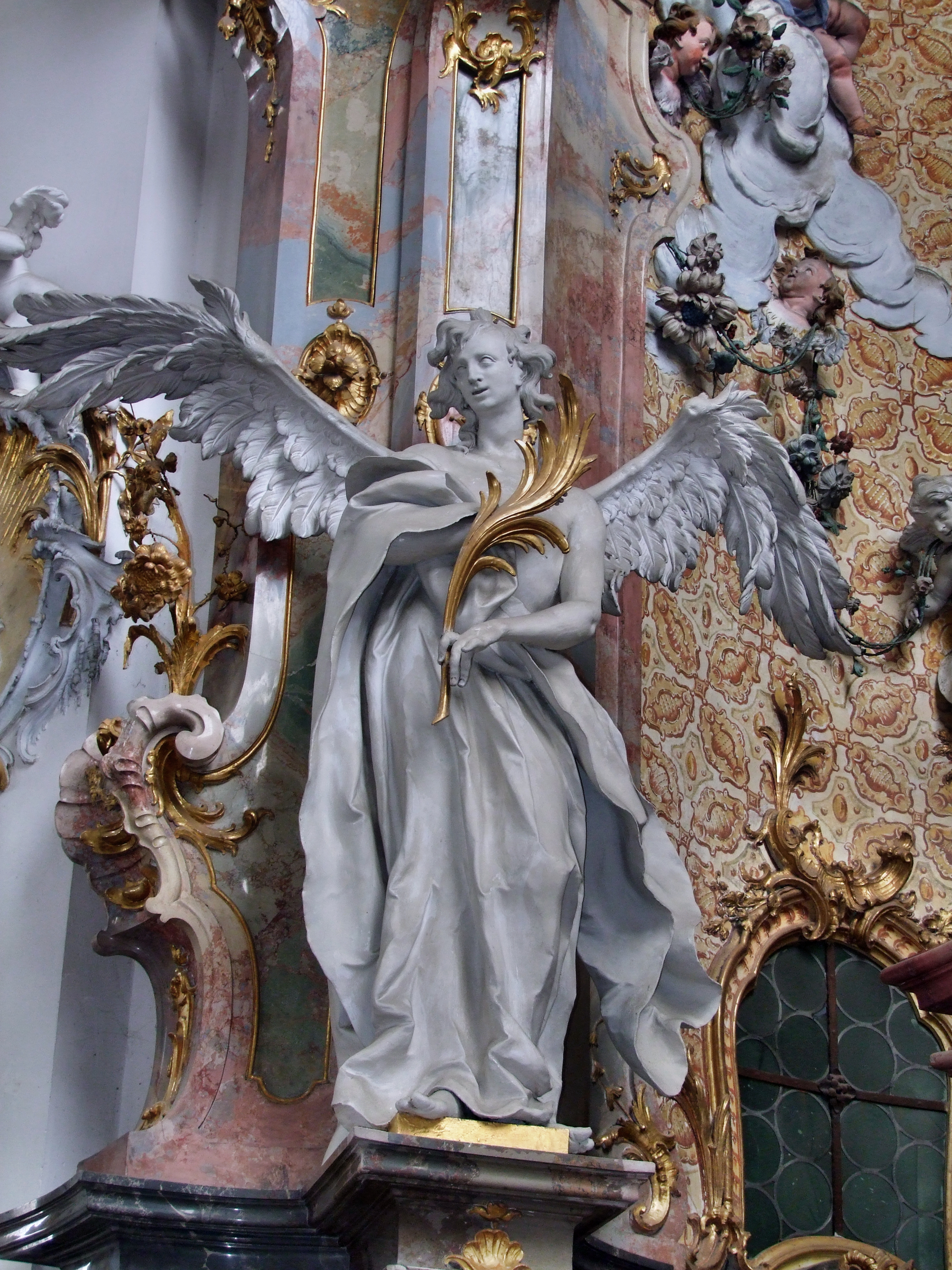
Baroque statues

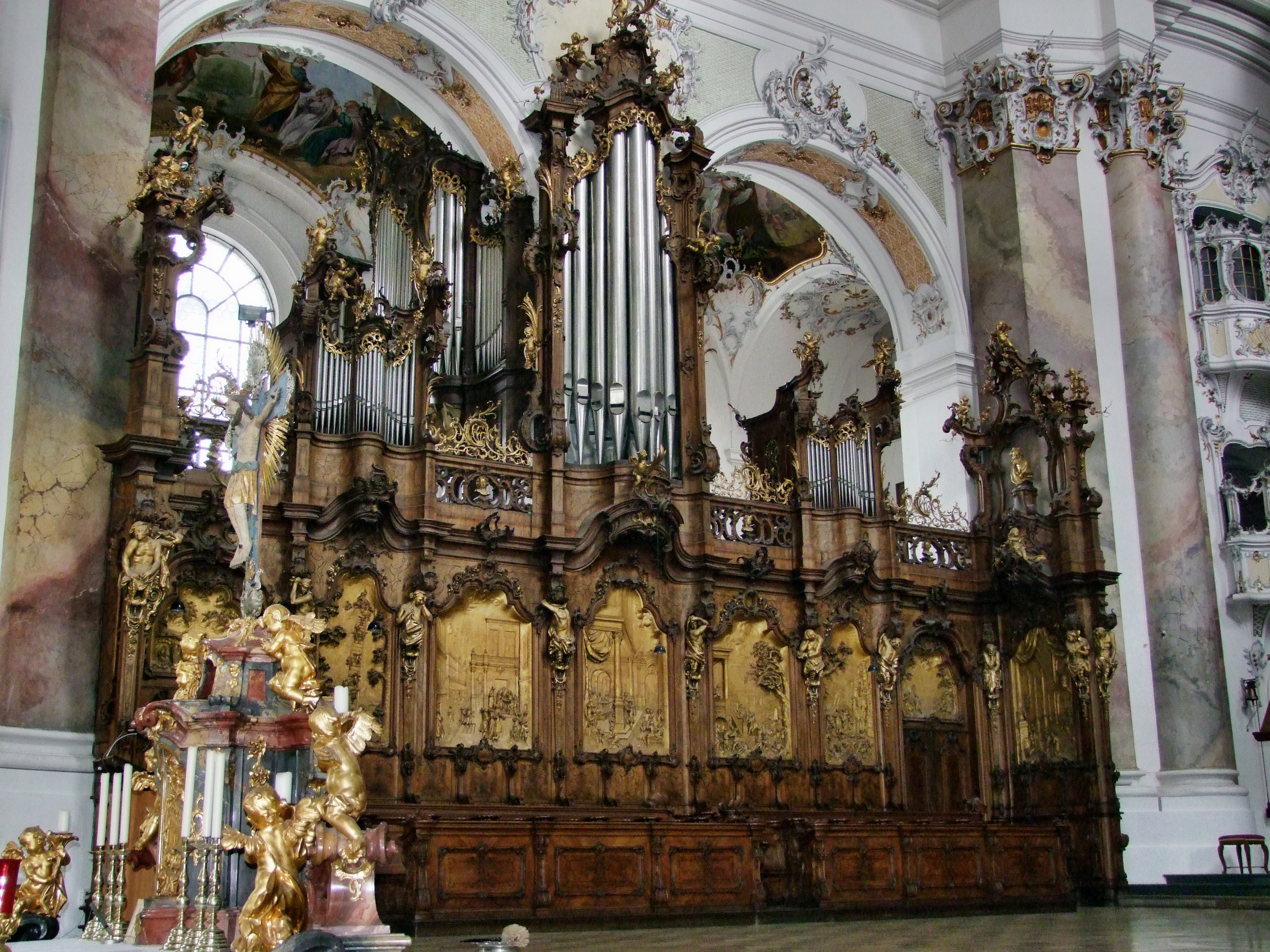
Choir stall

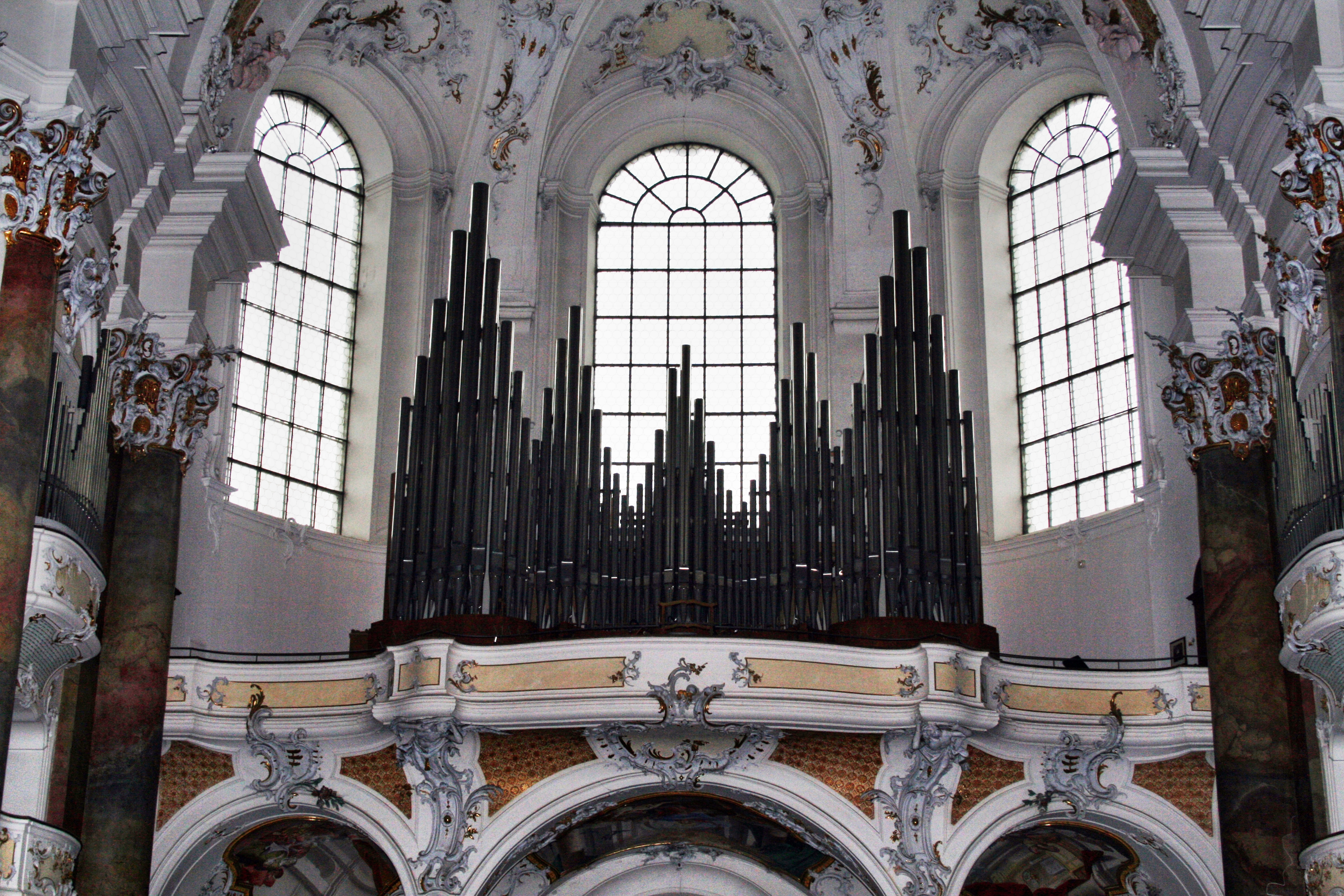
Organ

== See also ==
- Carolingian architecture
- Carolingian art
- List of Carolingian monasteries
