= Beatrix Oroszi =

Hungarian epidemiologist and physician

Beatrix Oroszi is a Hungarian epidemiologist who has served as Chief Medical Officer of Hungary since June 2026. She is the head of the Methodological Developments in the Health System project at the National Public Health Center of Hungary. Before that, she was the acting Director General of the National Center for Epidemiology in Hungary.

In 2004, Oroszi earned her medical degree with a specialization in Preventive Medicine and Public Health from Semmelweis University and a Master of Science in Epidemiology in 2006 from the London School of Hygiene & Tropical Medicine. In 2000, she earned a Diploma of Health Services Management and Health Economics from the University of Szeged.
