= Volksschule Altomünster =

Coordinates: 48°23′08″N 11°15′53″E

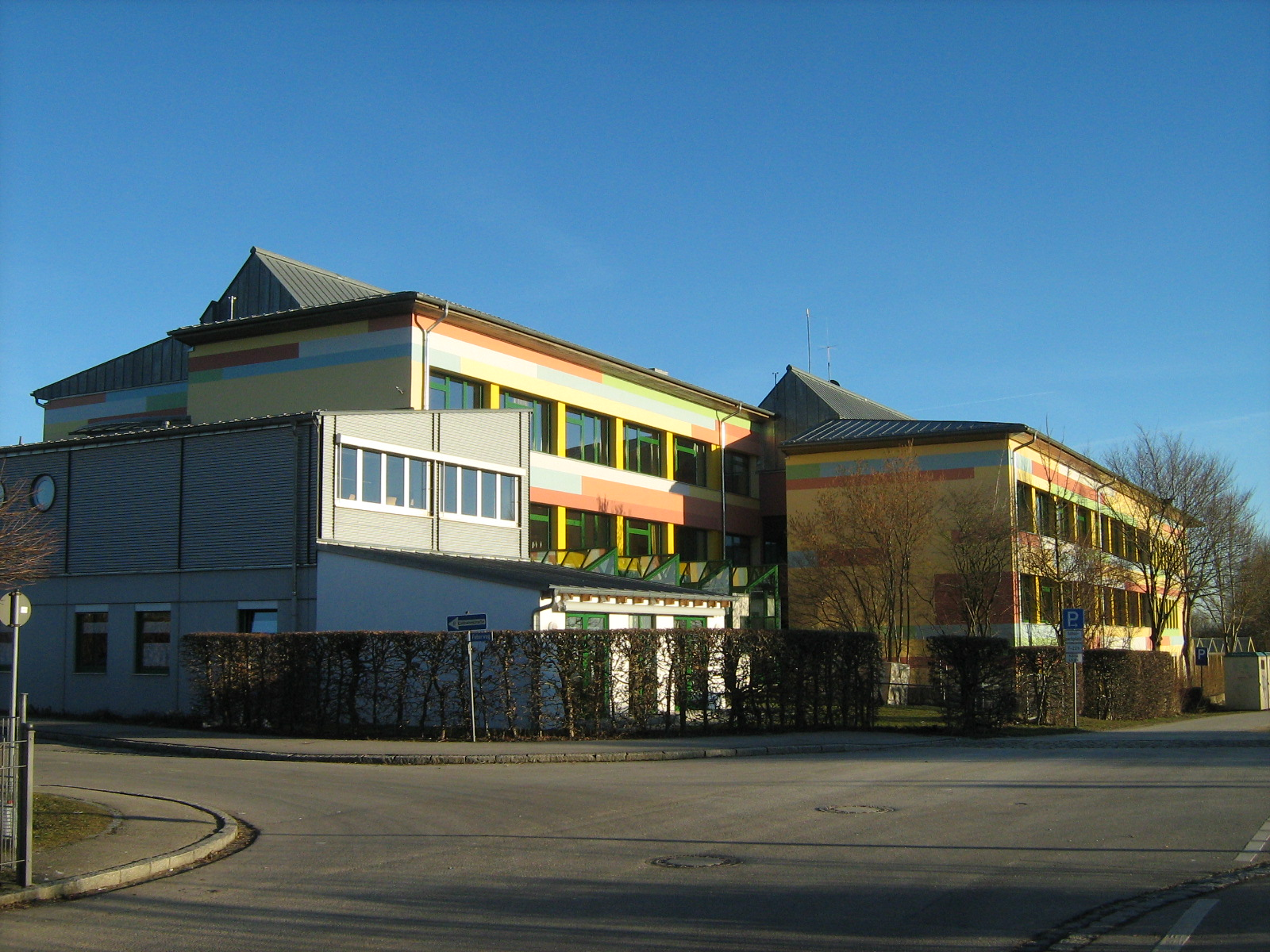
- Volksschule Altomünster, primary and secondary school in Altomünster
- Faberweg 13; D-85250 Altomünster; Bavaria; Germany

Information
- Type: Volksschule (Grundschule and Hauptschule)
- Established: 1378 / 1826 / 1912 / 1977
- Principal: Reinhardt Brückl
- Enrollment: 514
- Website: www.vs-altomuenster.de

Volksschule Altomünster is a school (Volksschule) in Altomünster in Bavaria. About 37 teachers are teaching pupils in form 1 to 9.

In a stairway of the school there is an art gallery from the Pop-art-artist Walter Gaudnek who is professor at University of Central Florida (College of Arts and Humanities).

== Comenius-partnership ==
Since October 2011 the Volksschule Altomünster has a Comenius-partnership. Declared school-partners are the „Primary School“ in Crook (England) and the „école primaire“ in Flesselles (France). The project-topic is „Healthy Active Citizens Across Europe“.

== Bibliography ==
- Reinhard Kreitmair: Schule und Bildung in Altomünster bis 1919. In: Wilhelm Liebhart (Hrsg.): Altomünster: Kloster, Markt und Gemeinde. 1023 S., Altomünster 1999, S.579-601, ISBN 3-00-005192-9.
- Fritz Ebshäuser: Das moderne Schulwesen. In: Wilhelm Liebhart (Hrsg.): Altomünster: Kloster, Markt und Gemeinde. 1023 S., Altomünster 1999, S.603-626, ISBN 3-00-005192-9.
