= National Centre for Public Health and Pharmacy =

Centralised government health agency

- Nemzeti Népegészségügyi és Gyógyszerészeti Központ

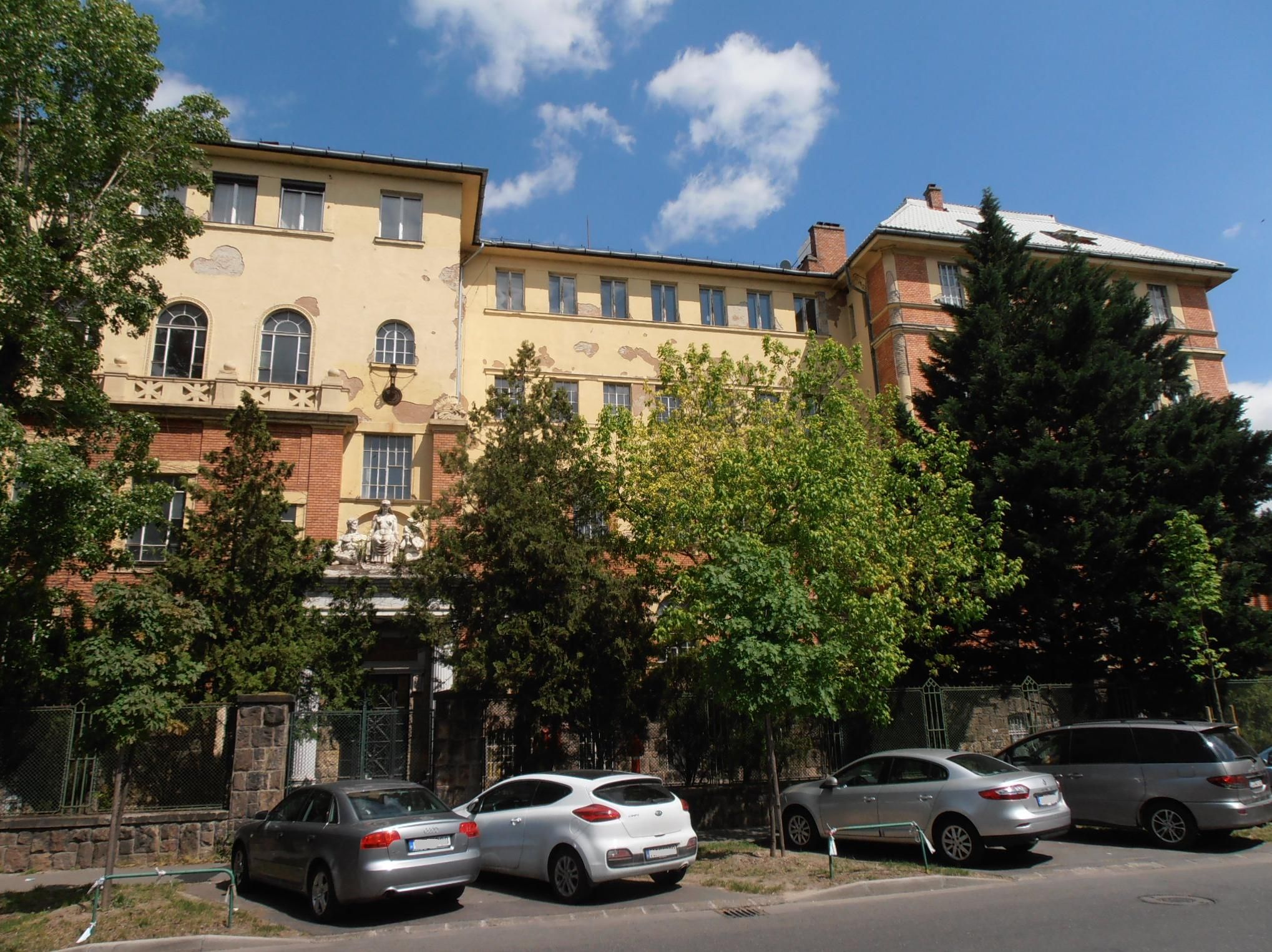
- Headquartered at the Building of National Centre of Epidemiology, Budapest, Hungary

Agency overview
- Formed: 1 October 2018
- Headquarters: Albert Flórián út 2-6, 1097, Budapest, Hungary
- Agency executive: Cecília Müller
- Website: nngyk.gov.hu

National Centre for Public Health and Pharmacy (NCPHP) (Hungarian: Nemzeti Népegészségügyi és Gyógyszerészeti Központ; NNGYK) is a Hungarian centralised budgetary body based in Budapest having been established in 2018 as the legal successor of the State Public Health and Medical Officer Service (ÁNTSZ). In December 2018, Hungarian physician Cecília Müller became the Chief Medical Officer.

With effect from 1 August, 2023, Hungary's National Pharmaceutical and Food Health Institute ceased to existed having been amalgamated with the former National Public Health Centre to form a new body, the NNGYK. Cecília Müller remains in post as director of the new agency.

== Governance ==
The agency is given authority under the Minister of Human Resources 18/2019. (VI. 6.) EMMI instruction on the Organisational and Operational Regulations (SZMSZ) of the National Centre for Public Health.

On 20 July 2023, the Hungarian Government passed Decree, No. 333/2023. (VII. 20.), giving authority for the National Institute of Pharmacy and Nutrition (OGYEI) to be subsumed into the new central body making the NCPHP the legal successor to the NNK and OGYÉI.

== Department of Health Administration ==
The National Centre for Public Health and Pharmacy encompasses the Department of Health Administration, an organisational unit under the direct supervision of the National Chief Medical Officer. The administration body has many roles and functions, such as the authorisation and control of the activities of health care providers. The tasks undertaken on behalf of the National Chief Medical Officer include, but are not limited to:

- provision of inpatient specialist care
- organising patient transport
- the supply of blood
- provision of haemodialysis
- cell and tissue banking
- diagnostics for molecular genetics
- in vitro fertilisation and genetic counselling
- investigating complaints, including public interest complaints against health care providers
- monitoring the enforcement of regulations governing the operation of health care institutions
- performing official tasks in relation to the authorisation of medical research, particularly where intervention in humans is implicated
- undertaking official tasks related to organ transplantation, particularly with respect to contracts with Eurotransplant
