= Alto of Altomünster =

Irish monk (d. c. 760)

St. Alto of Altomünster, O.S.B.
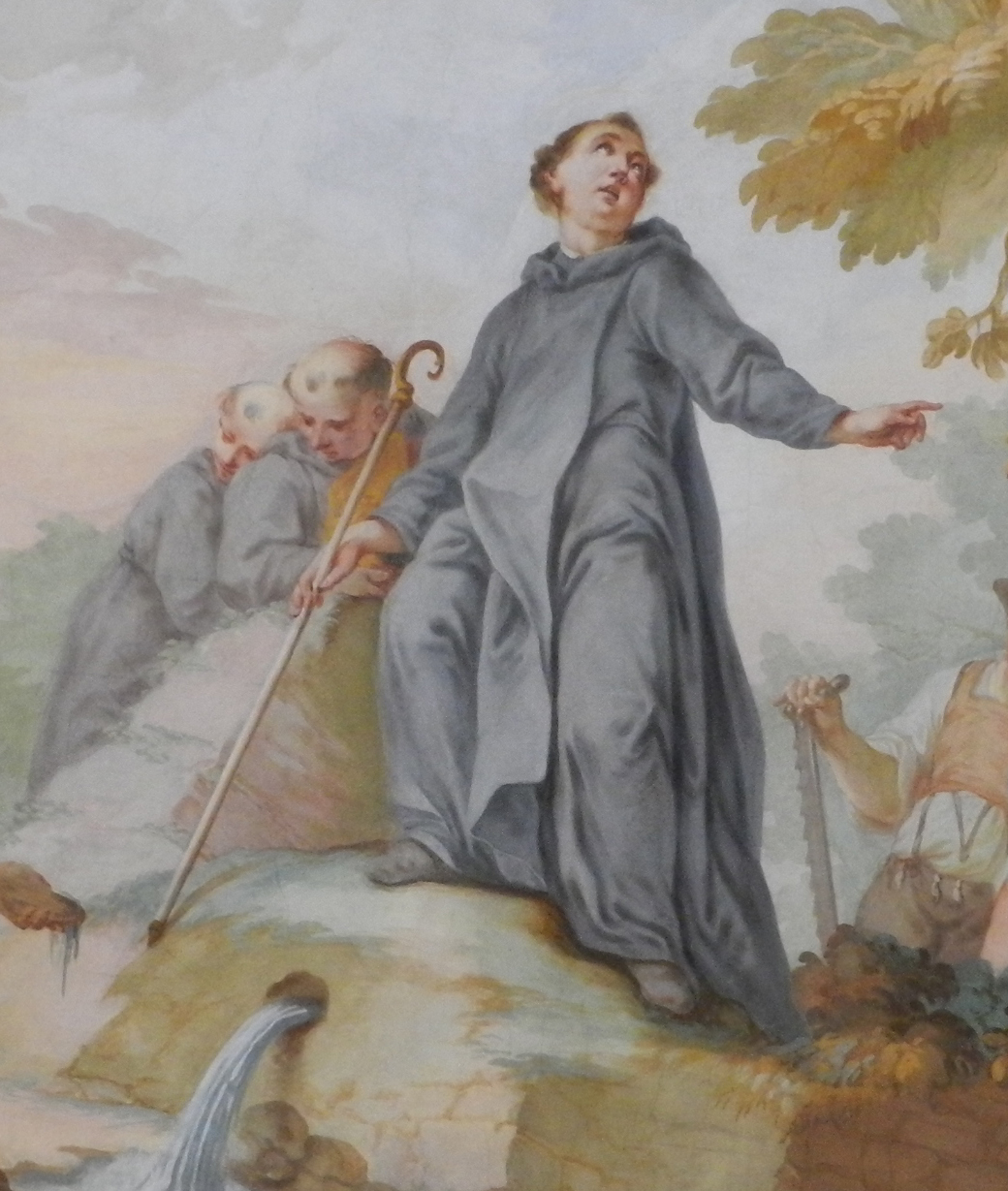
- Saint Alto awakens the Alto Spring, (detail) by Josef Mages (1728-1769), c. 1769, in the Church of St. Alto and St. Birgitta, Altomünster Abbey, Altomünster, Bavaria, Germany

Abbot
- Died: c. 760; Altomünster Abbey, Altomünster, Duchy of Bavaria
- Venerated in: Roman Catholic Church (Bavaria)
- Major shrine: Altomünster Abbey, Altomünster, Bavaria, Germany
- Feast: 9 February
- Patronage: Diocese of Freising

Alto, O.S.B., (died c. 760) was a Benedictine abbot active in the Duchy of Bavaria during the mid-8th century. Tradition holds him to be the eponymous founder of Altomünster Abbey, around which a market town grew up, also called Altomünster. He is honored as a saint by the Catholic Church.

== Life ==
Little is known about Alto; he is believed to have arrived in the region as a wandering Irish or Scottish monk, and to have previously lived as a hermit near both Munich and Augsburg.

There is a Vita of his life written by Otloh of St. Emmeram about 1062. The Diocese of Freising has a document dating perhaps to 763 with the signature Alto reclausus (Alto the hermit) which is considered to be his.

A donation by King Pepin the Short gave Alto some wooded land on which to build his monastery. Saint Boniface is said to have come to dedicate the church about the year 750.

A Gospel lectionary made for Altomünster Abbey has a metal cover which was added to the manuscript in 1489, depicting one of Saint Alto's miracles.

Alto's feast day is celebrated on 9 February.

== Legacy ==
St-Alto-way is a trail in the forest Alto.
