= Nagyvenyim =

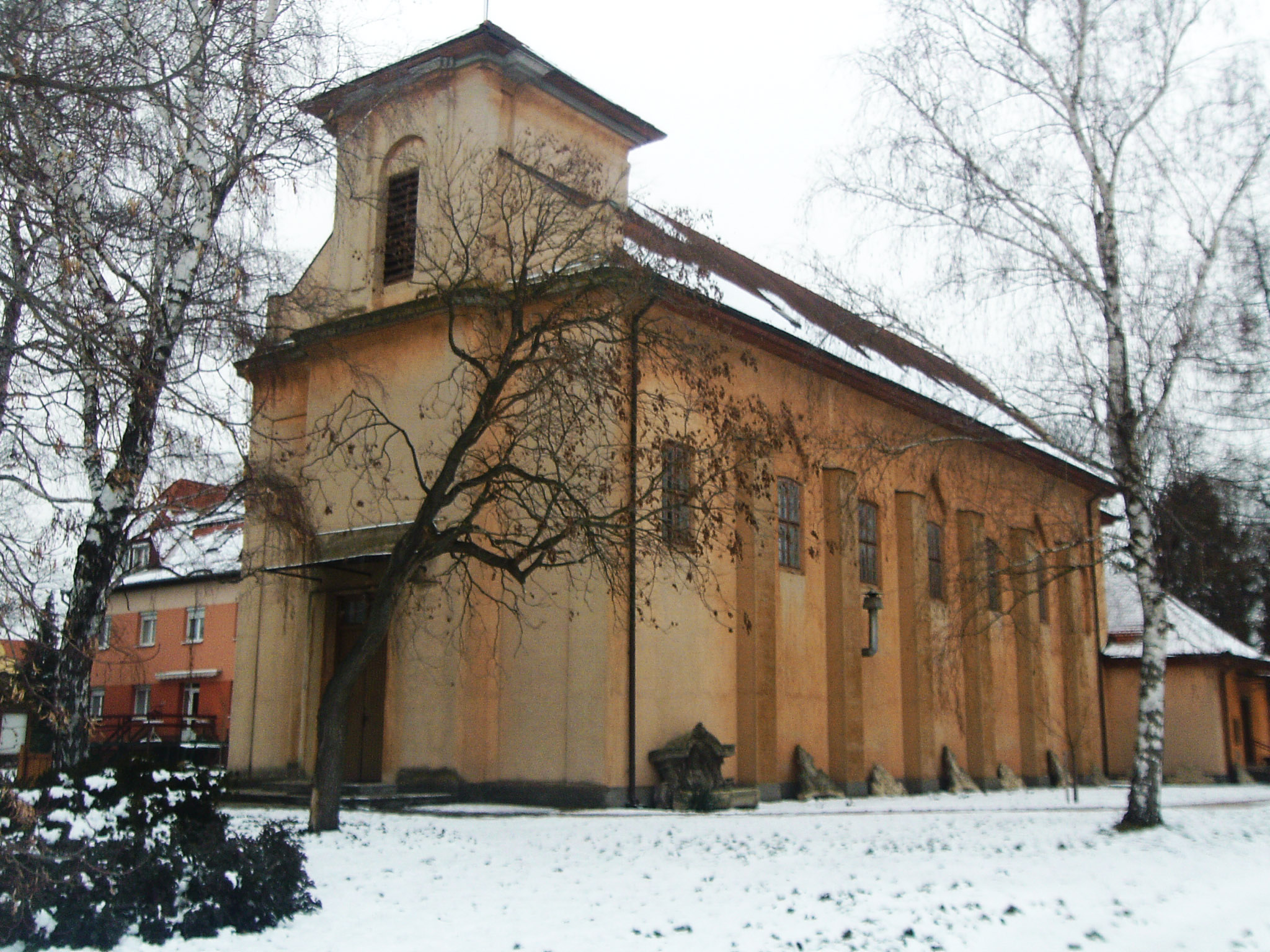
- Church of Our Lady

- Coat of arms

- Location of Fejér county in Hungary

- Location of Nagyvenyim
- Coordinates: 46.95904°N 18.85901°E
- Country: Hungary
- County: Fejér

Area
  - Total: 43.68 km^{2} (16.86 sq mi)

Population (2004)
  - Total: 4,081
  - Density: 93.42/km^{2} (242.0/sq mi)
- Time zone: UTC+1 (CET)
  - Summer (DST): UTC+2 (CEST)
- Postal code: 2421
- Area code: 25
- Website: www.nagyvenyim.hu

Nagyvenyim is a large village in Fejér county, Hungary.

Partnership: Altomünster (Germany)
