= Offo =

Irish-Scottish monk and founder of monasteries

Offo, Irish monk and founder of Schuttern Abbey, Germany, fl. 603.

Tradition relates that Offo was an Irishman, and a wandering monk. In the year 603 he founded what was then known as Offoniscella ("cell of Offo"). It later became known as Schuttern Abbey.

== See also ==
Other notable Irish people in Germany included:

- Erhard of Regensburg, Bishop of Regensburg, fl. 684.
- Minnborinus of Cologne, Abbot, fl. 974-986.
- Marianus Scotus, chronicler, died c. 1083.
- Tomás Ó Caiside, friar, soldier, and poet, c.1709-1773?
- Nina Hynes, singer-songwriter
