= Altomünster =

- Municipality
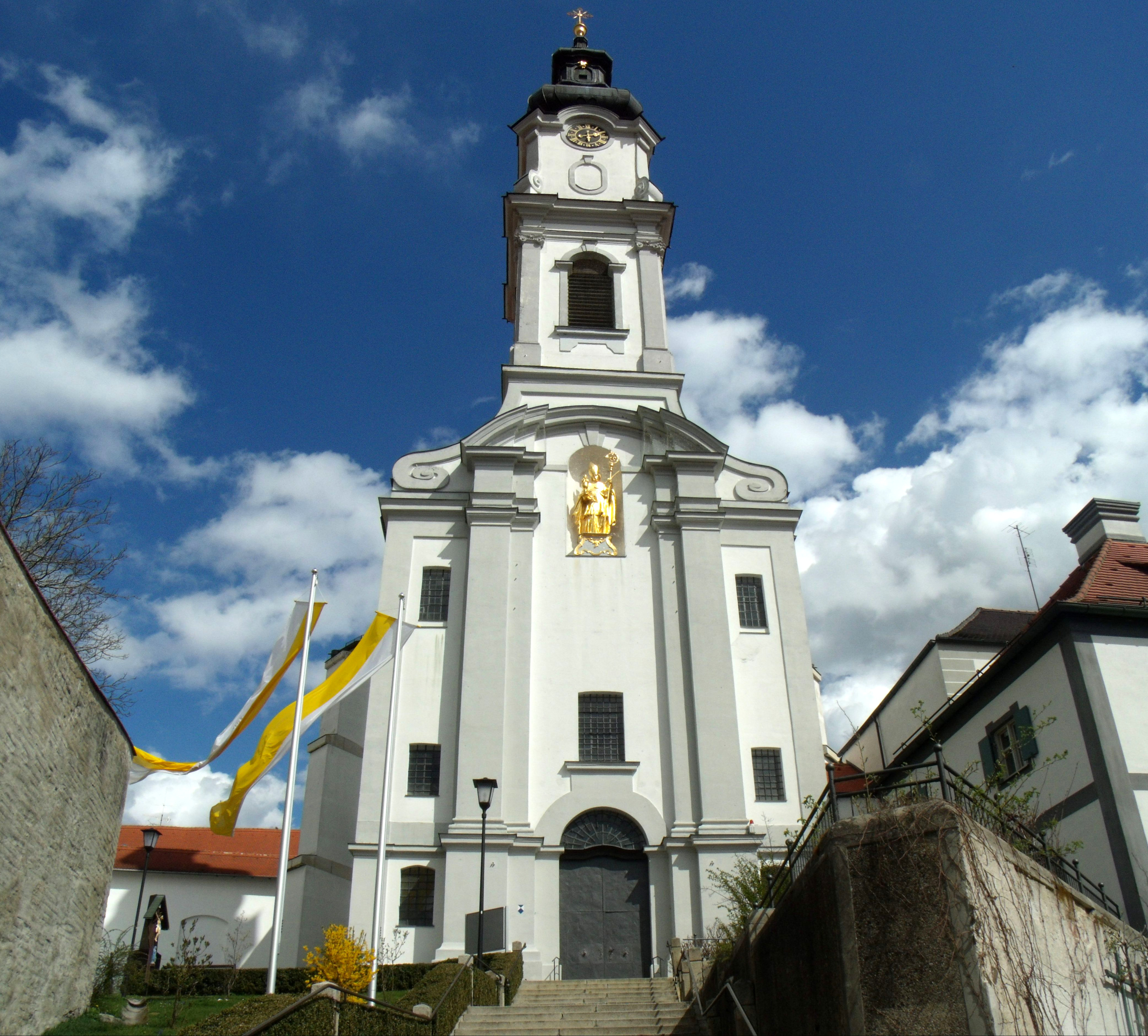
- Church of St Alto and Birgitta

- Coat of arms

- Location of Altomünster within Dachau district
- Interactive map of Altomünster
- Location within Germany Location within Bavaria
- Coordinates: 48°23′N 11°15′E
- Country: Germany
- State: Bavaria
- Admin. region: Oberbayern
- District: Dachau
- Subdivisions: 47 Ortsteile

Government
  - Mayor (2020–26): Michael Reiter

Area
  - Total: 75.79 km^{2} (29.26 sq mi)
- Elevation: 518 m (1,699 ft)

Population (2025-12-31)
  - Total: 7,876
  - Density: 103.9/km^{2} (269.1/sq mi)
- Time zone: UTC+01:00 (CET)
  - Summer (DST): UTC+02:00 (CEST)
- Postal codes: 85250
- Dialling codes: 08254
- Vehicle registration: DAH
- Website: www.altomuenster.de

Altomünster is a municipality in the district of Dachau in Bavaria in Germany.

== Geography ==
=== Geographical location ===
The market is located northwest of Dachau and almost in the middle of the triangle formed by the cities of Munich, Augsburg and Ingolstadt. The village lies on the DAH 2 state road. The Stumpfenbach ditch flows through Altomünster, which flows into the Zeitlbach.

=== Municipal structure ===
Markt Altomünster is organised into the following 48 villages:

Altomünster, Arnberg, Asbach, Breitenau, Deutenhofen, Erlach, Erlau, Freistetten, Haag, Halmsried, Hohenried, Hohenzell, Humersberg, Hutgraben, Irchenbrunn, Kiemertshofen, Lauterbach, Lichtenberg, Maisbrunn, Obererlach, Oberndorf, Oberschröttenloh, Oberzeitlbach, Ottelsburg, Ottmarshausen, Pfaffenhofen, Pipinsried, Plixenried, Radenzhofen, Rametsried, Randelsried, Reichertshausen, Röckersberg, Rudersberg, Ruppertskirchen, Schauerschorn, Schielach, Schloßberg, Schmarnzell, Schmelchen, Sengenried, Stumpfenbach, Teufelsberg, Thalhausen, Übelmanna, Unterzeitlbach, Wollomoos and Xyger.

== History ==
=== Chronology ===
In 750 A.D. a wandering monk named Alto came to the area and founded a small monastery.

Before 1000, the Guelphs built a Benedictine monastery. Welf I, Duke of Bavaria brought 1,056 monks to colonize the newly founded monastery vineyard in Altdorf (now Weingarten), while the nuns previously established in Altdorf came to Altomünster. They lived there until the dissolution of the monastery in 1488 by Pope Innocent VIII.

Around 1310, the Wittelsbach dukes awarded the residents town rights.

On 4 October 1391 the market and town rights were confirmed by Duke Stephen III, Duke of Bavaria.

Around 1420, the Ingolstadt dukes built the marketplace.

In 1496, Duke George of Bavaria gave nuns of the Order of St. Bridget of Sweden from Maihingen permission to found a monastery at Altomünster.

On March 18, 1803, the monastery was finally dissolved, although it was later revived. Today, apart from a branch in Bremen, it is the last monastery of the Order of St. Bridget of Sweden in Germany.

In 1823, Altomünster lost its town status and became a rural municipality with market rights. The main reason for this was the closure of the monastery, which had been the main employer paid all the administrative costs.

In 1862 a hospital was built.

In 1869 a kindergarten was built.

In 1882 the Market Savings Bank was founded.

There has been beer breweries in Altomünster since the 1490s. However in 1886 a modern Brewery named 'Maierbräu Altomünster' has been in business.

In 1888 Altomünster was connected to the telegraph service, followed in 1902 by the telephone service.

Between 1907 and 1910 the town was electrified.

On 18 December 1913 the Dachau–Altomünster railway opened.

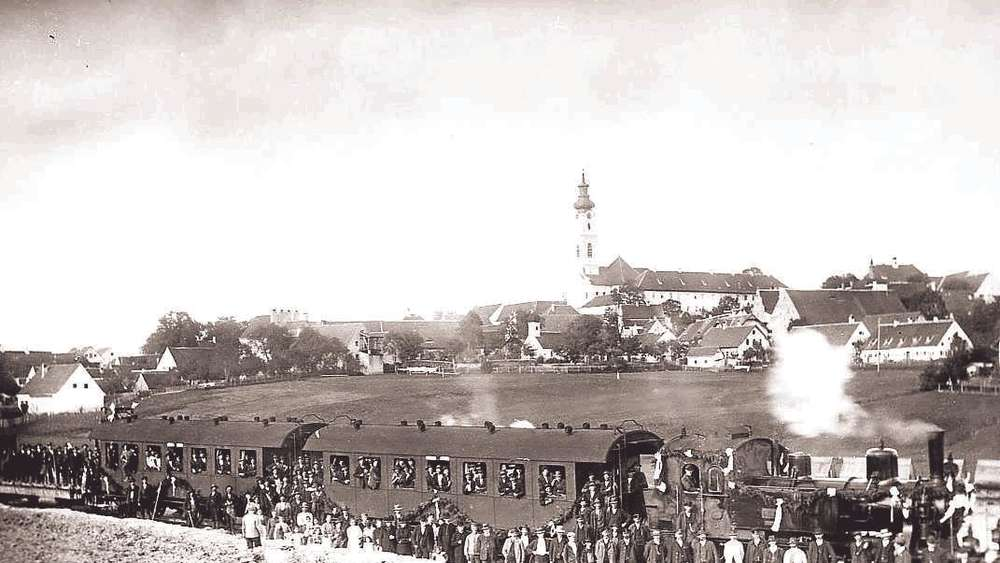
Opening of the Altomunster - Dachau Line in 1913

In 1977, a new school complex was inaugurated.

On 1 December 1996 the "Spider" discotheque burnt down - three days after the conviction of the manager and "disco mafia accomplice" Karl Heinz S. Since then, regular Spider revival parties have been held.

=== Incorporations ===
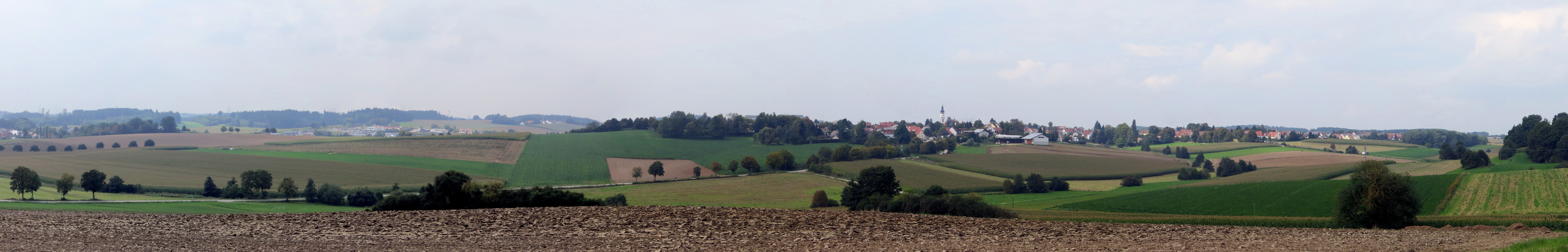
Panoramic view from the east

Region	Inhabitants (1970)	Incorporation date	Remarks
Thalhausen	243	1 May 1978	
Wollomoos	478	1 May 1978	
Pipinsried	444	1 May 1978	Inclusion of 351 444 inhabitants, reclassification of the other inhabitants according to Markt Indersdorf
Hohenzell	435	1 May 1978	
Kiemertshofen	146	1 January 1977	
Oberzeitlbach	493	1 January 1976	
Randelsried	349	1 January 1976	Inclusion of 300 349 inhabitants, reclassification of the other inhabitants by Tandern
Stumpfenbach	191	1 January 1972	

== Politics ==
=== Market council ===
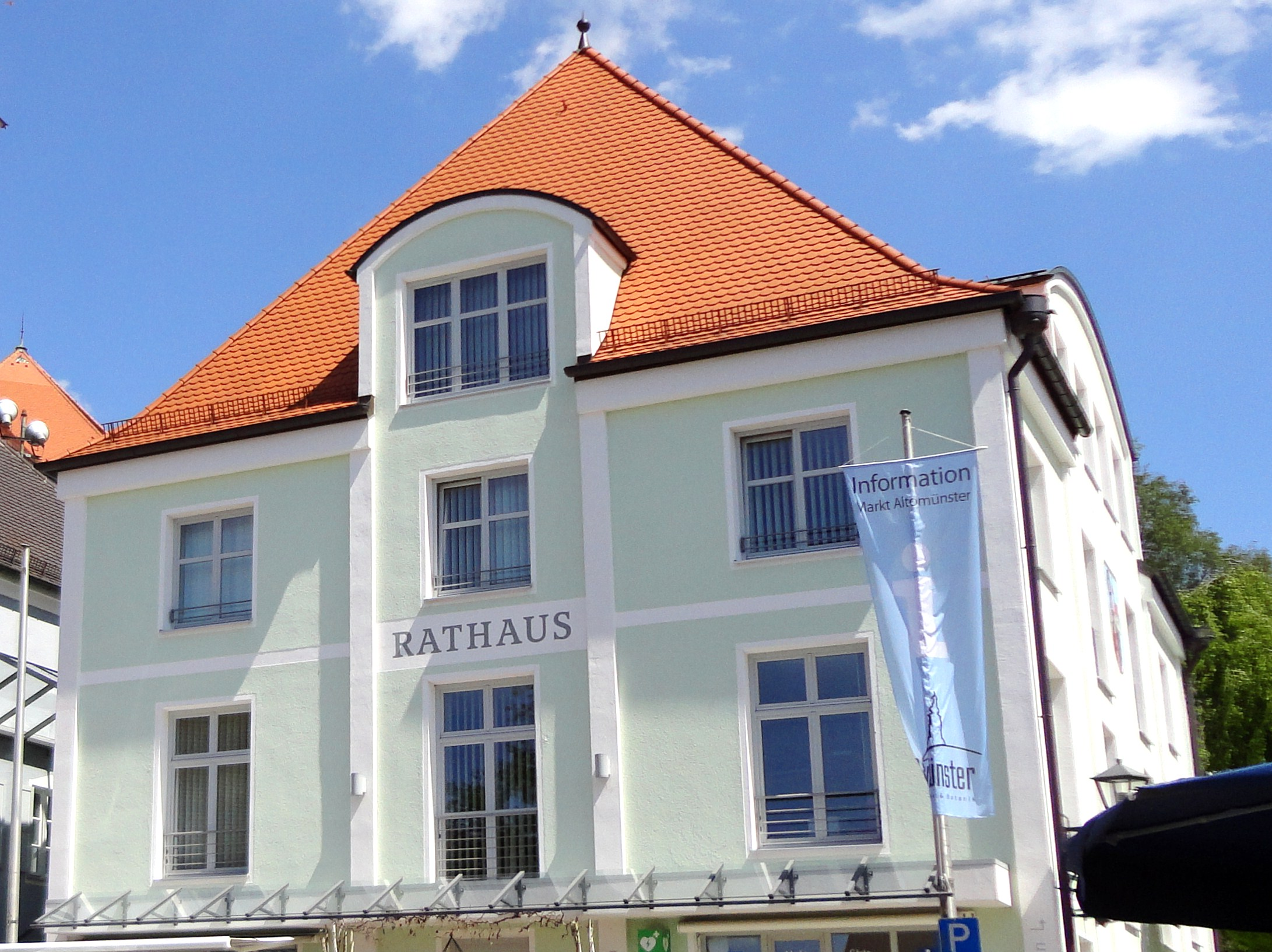
Town hall

The council of Altomuenster is composed of 20 elected and volunteer council seats and First Mayor of the market. The municipal election held on 16 March 2014 led to the following conclusions:

Party	Seats
CSU	9
FWG	10
SPD	1
Total	20

== Education ==
The Altomünster Primary and Middle School (Volksschule Altomünster) has about 500 pupils. Since October 2011, it has had been part of the Comenius partnership. Declared school partners are the primary school in Crook (England) and the école primaire in Flesselles (France). The project topic is "Healthy Active Citizens Across Europe".

== Partnership ==
- Nagyvenyim (Hungary)
