= Chief Medical Officer of Hungary =

Health advisor to the government of Hungary

The Chief Medical Officer of Hungary is a government official, head of the National Centre for Public Health and Pharmacy. The current office holder is Beatrix Oroszi. The chief medical officer reports to the Ministry of Human Capacities through the undersecretary for health.

== Responsibilities ==
The chief medical officer has several responsibilities and a complex jurisdiction which is stated in the 5.1 section of 18/2019. (VI. 6.) directive of the Minister of Human Capacities on the organizational and operational rules of the National Centre for Public Health and Pharmacy. These are including but not limited to:

- organizational operational duties
- supervising, controlling and inspectional roles
- managing and supervising duties related to public health

== Replacement ==
In case of the chief medical officer's absence or inability, the deputy chief medical officer I takes over the power and duties of the surgeon general; in case of the deputy chief medical officer I's absence or inability, the deputy chief medical officer II shall fulfill the duties.

== History ==
During the Kingdom of Hungary, the establishment of a public health organization is related to Queen Maria Theresa. The first comprehensive public health regulation was released in 1770 under the title Generale normativum in re sanitatis. The Generale normativum established the office of physicus (chief medical officer). The chief medical officer is the traditional name of the office. However, the name of the organization responsible for public health administration has changed several times since 2010. The Minister of Human Capacities, by releasing the 18/2019. (VI. 6.) directive on the organizational and operational rules of the National Public Health Center, overruled the 51/2017. (X. 15.) ministerial directive. Previously the Office of the Chief Medical Officer was part of the National Public Health and Medical Officer Service.

== Former chief medical officers ==
- 1991-1995: Pál Kertai
- 1995–1997: Endre Morava
- 1997–2001: Ilona Molnár
- 2001: Alán Pintér
- 2001–2002: Katalin Lun
- 2002–2003: György Ungváry
- 2004–2006: László Bujdosó
- 2007–2010: Ferenc Falus
- 2010–2015: Judit Paller
- 2016–2018: Tamás Szentes
- 2018: Attila Kovács
- 2018–2025: Cecília Müller
- 2025–2026: Orsolya Surján
- 2026 – incumbent: Beatrix Oroszi
