= Otloh of Sankt Emmeram =

Otloh of St. Emmeram (also Othlo) (c. 1010 – c. 1072) was a Benedictine monk, composer, writer and music theorist of St Emmeram's in Regensburg.

== Life ==
Otloh was born around 1010 in the bishopric of Freising. After studying at Tegernsee and Hersfeld, he was called to Würzburg by Bishop Meinhard (due, Otloh tells us in his Book of Visions, to his skill as a scribe). Otloh served as a secular cleric in the diocese of Freising before pursuing a monastic career against the wishes of his father; he eventually took monastic vows in 1032 at St. Emmeram's, Regensburg. Appointed dean in 1055, he also was magister scholae (head of the monastic school), and numbered among his students the reforming abbot William of Hirsau (†1091). Otloh was among the authors who elaborated the story of the transfer of the relics of Saint Denis the Areopagite to Regensburg, and long was believed to have forged letters of exemption for his monastery, a charge which recently has begun to be reconsidered. Conflicts with his abbot and bishop led Otloh to leave St. Emmeram's in 1062 for Fulda, where he remained until 1067. After a short stay at the Franconian monastery of Amorbach, he returned to Regensburg and spent the rest of his days on literary work, most notably a quasi-autobiographical account of the temptations he had overcome during his life (the Liber de tentationibus suis) and a collection of visionary tales, including his own (the Liber visionum).

Otloh appears to have been the music theory teacher of Wilhelm of Hirsau and is cited in his treatise "De musica," but no treatise on music by Otloh is extant. Several liturgical chants in manuscripts from St. Emmeram are in his hand, some of which he probably composed, including the sequence for St. Dionysius "Exultemus in ista fratres," a proper office for St. Dionysius, and the troped Kyrie "O pater immense."

== Works ==
Otloh's works are collected in volume 146 of Migne, Patrologia Latina, columns 27-434, including:

Dialogus de suis tentationibus, varia fortuna et scriptis
Life of Saint Wolfgang of Regensburg
Life of Saint Boniface
Life of Saint Alto
Life of Saint Magnus
Dialogus de tribus quæstionibus
De promissionis bonorum et malorum causis
De cursu spirituali
De translatione s. Dionysii e Francia in Germaniam (fragmentary)
De miraculo quod nuper accidit cuidam laico
De admonitione clericorum et laicorum
De spirituali doctrina
Liber Proverbiorum
Sermo in natali apostolorum
Liber visionum tum suarum tum aliorum

=== Modern critical editions ===
- Othloni Libellus Proverbiorum, ed. G.C. Korfmacher (Loyola University Press, 1936); see, however, the review by Bernhard Bischoff in Historisches Jahrbuch 57 (1937), who unlike Korfmacher addresses the work's multiple recensions.
- Otloh von St. Emmeram. Libellus de doctrina spirituali, Liber de cursu spirituali und weitere, kleinere Werke, ed. Gaia Clementi (Bayerische Akademie der Wissenschaften, 2025).
- Otloh von St. Emmeram 'Liber de temptatione cuiusdam monachi'. Untersuchung, kritische Edition und Übersetzung, trans. and ed. Sabine Gäbe (Peter Lang, 1999).
- Liber Visionum, ed. Paul Gerhard Schmidt in MGH Quellen zur Geistesgeschichte (Böhlau, 1989).
- Translationis et inventionis sancti Dionysii Ratisponensis historia, ed. Adolf Hofmeister in MGH Scriptores vol. 30/2 (Hiersemann, 1926), 823-37.
- Vitae Bonifatii libri duo, ed. Wilhelm Levison in Vitae Sancti Bonifatii archiepiscopi Mogutini (MGH Scriptores rerum Germanicarum in usum scholarum separatim editi, vol. 57) (Hahn, 1905), 111-217.
- Vita sancti Magni, ed. in Maurice Coens, "La Vie de S. Magne de Füssen par Otloh de St.-Emmeran," Analecta Bollandiana 81 (1963): 159-227.

=== English translations ===
An excerpt of the Liber de tentationibus is translated in Other Middle Ages: Witnesses at the Margins of Medieval Society, ed. Michael Goodich (University of Pennsylvania Press, 1998), 159-63. A complete translation of the Liber de tentationibus and Liber visionum currently is in preparation for Broadview Press's "Readings in Medieval Civilizations and Cultures" series.

=== Critical studies ===
- Evans, Gillian (1977). "Studium discendi: Otloh von St. Emmeram and the Seven Liberal Arts". Recherches de théologie ancienne et médiévale. 44: 29–54.
- Joyce, Ellen (2005). "Scribal Performance and Identity in the Autobiographical Visions of Otloh of St. Emmeram (d. 1067)". Essays in Medieval Studies. 22: 95–106. doi:10.1353/ems.2006.0007. S2CID 162286686.
- Otten, Willemien (1997). "The Bible and the Self in Medieval Autobiography: Otloh of St. Emmeram (1010-1070) and Peter Abelard (1079-1142)". In John McCarthy; David Aune (eds.). The Whole and Divided Self: The Bible and Theological Anthropology. Crossroads. pp. 130–57.
- Resnick, Irven (1986). "Litterati, Spirituales, and Lay Christians according to Otloh of Saint Emmeram". Church History. 55 (2): 165–78. doi:10.2307/3167418. JSTOR 3167418. S2CID 161396107.
- Resnick, Irven (1987). "Scientia liberalis, Dialectics, and Otloh of St. Emmeram". Revue Bénédictine. 97 (3–4): 241–52. doi:10.1484/J.RB.4.01187.
- Röckelein, Hedwig (1987). Otloh, Gottschalk, Tnugdal: Individuelle und kollektive Visionsmuster des Hochmittelalters. Peter Lang.
- Schauwecker, Helga (1966). "Otloh und die St. Emmeramer Fälschungen des 11. Jahrhunderts". Verhandlungen des Historischen Vereins für Oberpfalz und Regensburg. 106: 103–20.
- Schauwecker, Helga (1964). Otloh von St Emmeram: Ein Beitrag zur Bildungs- und Frommigkeitsgeschichte des 11. Jahrhunderts. Bayerische Benediktiner-Akademie.
- Schmid, Alois (1989). "'Auf glühendem Thron in der Hölle': Gebhard III., Otloh von St. Emmeram und die Dionysiusfälschung". Ratisbona Sacra. Das Bistum Regensburg im Mittelalter. Kunstsammlungen des Bistums Regensburg - Diözesanmuseum Regensburg. Kataloge und Schriften. Vol. 6. Schnell und Steiner. pp. 119–21.
- Uskov, Nikolai (1999). "Die Conversio eines Mönches im 11. Jahrhundert. Otloh von St. Emmeram bei der Arbeit an seiner Autobiographie". Verhandlungen des Historisches Vereins für Oberpfalz und Regensburg. 139: 1–39.
- Vinay, Gustavo (1970). "Otloh di St. Emmeramo ovvero l'autografia di un nevrotico". La storiografia altomedievale. pp. 13–37.

== Sources ==
- Hiley, David (2001). "Otloh of St Emmeram". Grove Music Online. Oxford, England: Oxford University Press. doi:10.1093/gmo/9781561592630.article.52834. ISBN 978-1-56159-263-0. (subscription, Wikipedia Library access or UK public library membership required)
