= Flesselles, Somme =

Flesselles
- Commune
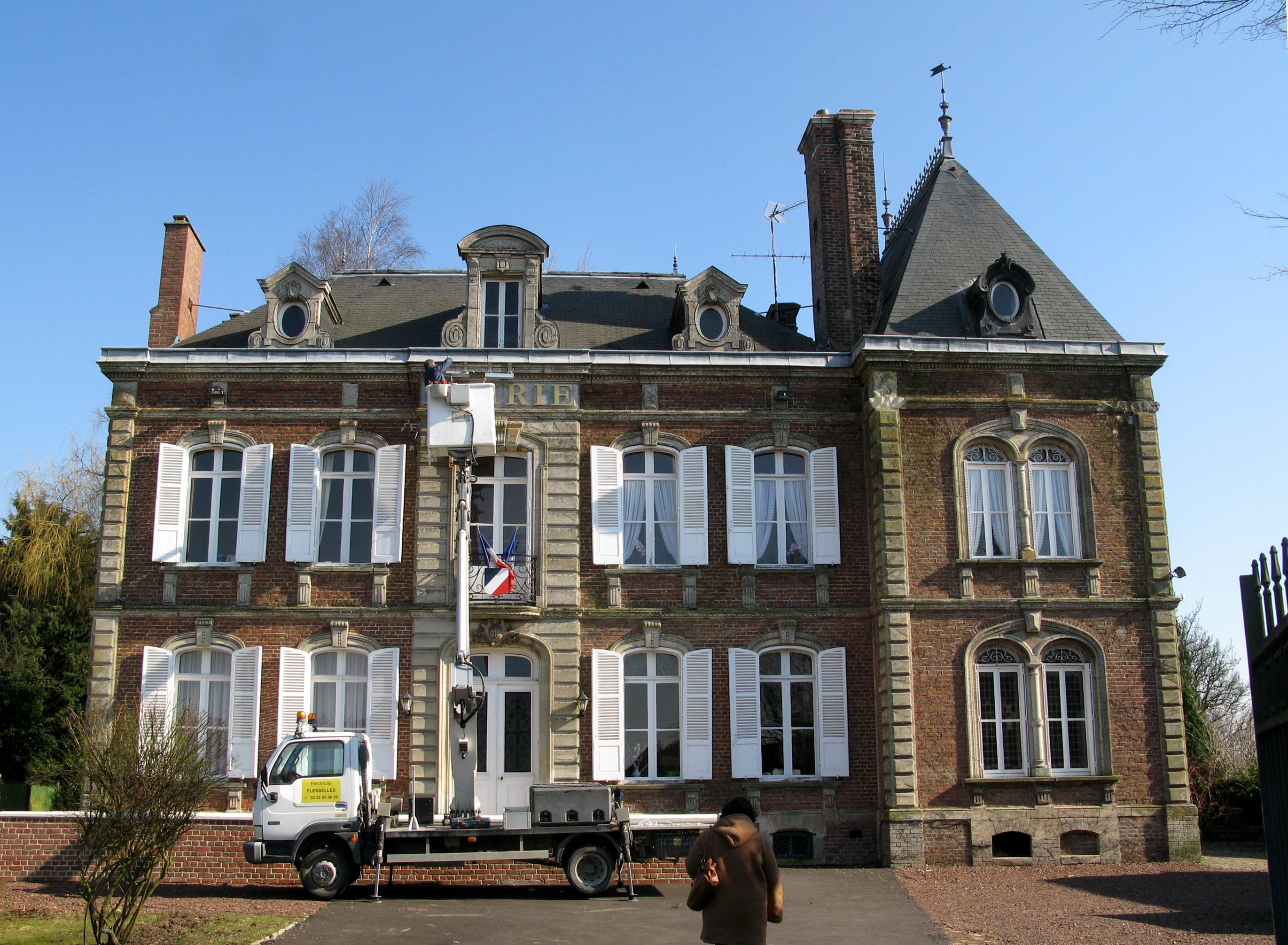
- The town hall in Flesselles

- Coat of arms
- Location of Flesselles
- Location within France Location within Hauts-de-France
- Coordinates: 50°00′07″N 2°15′38″E
- Country: France
- Region: Hauts-de-France
- Department: Somme
- Arrondissement: Amiens
- Canton: Flixecourt
- Intercommunality: CC Territoire Nord Picardie

Government
  - Mayor (2022–2026): Jocelyn Louette
- Area^{1}: 20.49 km^{2} (7.91 sq mi)
- Elevation: 135 m (443 ft)
- Highest elevation: 134 m (440 ft)
- Lowest elevation: 57 m (187 ft)
- Population (2023): 1,937
  - Density: 94.53/km^{2} (244.8/sq mi)
- Time zone: UTC+01:00 (CET)
  - Summer (DST): UTC+02:00 (CEST)
- INSEE/Postal code: 80316 /80260
- ^{1} French Land Register data, which excludes lakes, ponds, glaciers > 1 km^{2} (0.386 sq mi or 247 acres) and river estuaries.

Flesselles (French pronunciation: [flɛsɛl]; Picard: Fléchèle) is a commune in the Somme department in Hauts-de-France in northern France.

== Geography ==
Flesselles is situated on the D933 road, some 8 miles (13 km) north of Amiens. Nearby towns include Villers-Bocage to the east and Vignacourt to the west.

== Population ==
Historical population
Year	Pop.	±% p.a.
1968	730	—
1975	898	+3.00%
1982	1,361	+6.12%
1990	2,103	+5.59%
1999	2,143	+0.21%
2007	2,004	−0.83%
2012	2,041	+0.37%
2017	2,063	+0.21%
2023	1,937	−1.04%
Source: INSEE

== Places of interest ==
The 17th–18th-century château, with vestiges of the ancient 14th-century fortress at the base of its tower.

== Education ==
Since October 2011 the „école primaire“ in Flesselles has a Comenius-partnership. Declared school-partners are the Volksschule Altomünster (Germany/Bavaria) and the „Primary School“ in Crook (England). The project-topic is „Healthy Active Citizens Across Europe“.

== Personalities ==
- Max Lejeune, French politician was born at Flesselles in 1909.

== See also ==
- Communes of the Somme department
