= Emily =

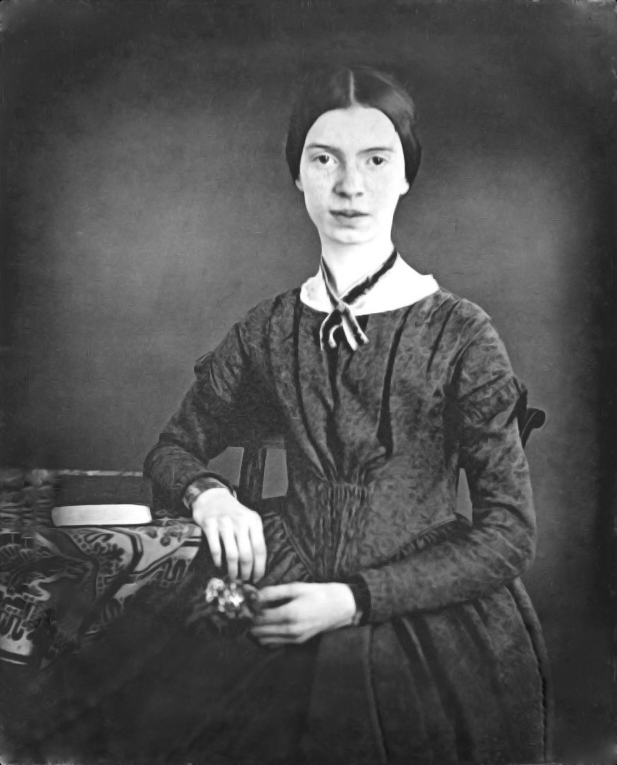
- The 19th-century poet Emily Dickinson
- Pronunciation: /ˈɛməliː/
- Gender: Female

Origin
- Language: Latin
- Meaning: Rival

Other names
- Related names: Amelia; Emilia; Emil; Emma; Emilie; Emmy; Millie; Milly; Emiri

Emily is a feminine given name derived from the Roman family name "Aemilius", and is the feminine form of the name Emil.

== Popularity ==
Emily has been a popular name in the English-speaking world, ranking among the most popular names in the United States, Canada, the United Kingdom, Ireland, Australia, and New Zealand. For more than a decade, from 1996 to 2007, it was the most common name given to girls in the United States. It has declined in usage in some countries but has remained a well-used name all over the world. In 2022, it was the 31st most popular name given to girls in Canada.

In the English-speaking world, the name Emily first became popular thanks to German-born Princess Amelia of Great Britain, who was called Emily in English.

The popularity of the name in the 1990s and early years of the 21st century has given the name an everywoman image for women in their twenties. As a result, the name has recently been used for a number of characters in film and television productions such as Emily the Criminal and Emily in Paris.

== Name variants ==
Alternate forms include:

- Aemilia (Latin)
- Aemiliana (Latin)
- Aemilianus (Latin)
- Aemilius (Latin)
- Aimil (Scottish Gaelic)
- Aimilios (Greek)
- Aimilia (Greek)
- Ái My (Vietnamese)
- Amilia (English)
- Eemeli (Finnish)
- Eemi (Finnish)
- Eemil (Finnish)
- Eimíle (Irish)
- Emalee (English)
- Emelie (Swedish)
- Emiel (Dutch)
- Emily (English)
- Emil (Bulgarian), (Croatian), (Czech), (Danish), (English), (German), (Hungarian), (Icelandic), (Indonesian), (Macedonian), (Norwegian), (Polish), (Romanian), (Russian), (Serbian), (Slovak), (Slovene), (Swedish)
- Émile (French)
- Emilee (English)
- Emili (Catalan)
- Emili (Hebrew), (Hungarian)
- Emília (Hungarian), (Portuguese), (Slovak)
- Emilía (Icelandic)
- Emilia (Bulgarian), (Danish), (English), (Finnish), (German), (Indonesian), (Italian), (Norwegian), (Polish), (Romanian), (Spanish), (Swedish)
- Emilian (Polish), (Romanian)
- Emiliana (Italian), Indonesian, (Portuguese), (Spanish)
- Emiliano (Italian), (Spanish)
- Émilie (French)
- Emílie (Czech)
- Emilie (Danish), (German), (Norwegian), (Swedish)
- Émilien (French)
- Émilienne (French)
- Emīlija (Latvian)
- Emilija (Croatian), (Lithuanian), (Macedonian), (Serbian), (Slovene)
- Emílio (Portuguese)
- Emilio (Italian), (Spanish)
- Emilios (Greek)
- Emilis (Lithuanian)
- Emiliya (Bulgarian)
- Emīlija (Latvian)
- Emlyn (Welsh)
- Emmi (Finnish)
- Emmie (English)
- Emmy (English), (French), (Indonesian)
- Emiri/えみり(Japanese)
- Emy (French), (Indonesian)
- Milja (Finnish)
- Mille (Danish), (Norwegian), (Swedish)
- Millie (English)
- Milly (English), (Indonesian), (Norwegian), (Swedish)
- Yemelyan (Russian)

== People with the name ==
=== Academics ===
- Emily Ying Yang Chan (born 1974), Hong Kong SAR academic
- Emily Greenwood, American classicist
- Emily Hendree Stewart Park (1848–1910), president, Washington Seminary (Atlanta)
- Emily Wick (1921–2013), American chemist at MIT
- Emily Calandrelli (1986/1987-Present), American Scientist, Engineer, Author, and Television Presenter

=== Actresses ===
- Emily Barclay (born 1984), New Zealand actress
- Emily Beecham (born 1984), English actress
- Emily Blunt (born 1983), English actress
- Emily Booth (born 1976), English actress and TV presenter
- Emily Browning (born 1988), Australian actress
- Emily Burnett (born 1996), Welsh actress
- Emily Coutts (born 1989), Canadian actress
- Emily Deschanel (born 1976), American actress
- Emily Flain (born 2003), Northern Irish actress
- Emily Gimmel (born 1984), American journalist and TV personality
- Emily Hampshire (born 1981), Canadian actress
- Emily Joyce (born 1969), British actress
- Emily Kagan (born 1981), American mixed martial artist
- Emily Kinney (born 1985), American actress, singer, and songwriter
- Emily Lloyd (born 1970), British actress
- Emily Lloyd-Saini, British actress, broadcaster, writer and comedian
- Emily Mortimer (born 1971), English actress
- Emily Osment (born 1992), American actress and singer
- Emily Perkins (born 1977), Canadian actress
- Emily Procter (born 1968), American actress
- Emily Ratajkowski (born 1991), American actress
- Emily Bett Rickards (born 1991), Canadian actress
- Emily Robins (born 1989), New Zealand actress
- Emily Rose (actress) (born 1981), American actress
- Emily Rudd (born 1993), American actress
- Emily Rutherfurd (born 1974), American actress
- Emily or Emma Stone (born 1988), American actress
- Emily VanCamp (born 1986), Canadian actress
- Emily Watson (born 1967), English actress

=== Musicians ===
- Emily Armstrong (born 1986), American singer
- Emily Bauer (born 1981), American singer
- Emily Haines (born 1974), Canadian indie rock singer-songwriter
- Emily Magee (born 1968), American soprano
- Emily Nokes, American writer, artist, music critic and musician
- Emily Remler (1957–1990), American jazz guitarist
- Emily Robison (born 1972), American songwriter
- Emily Saliers (born 1963), American singer-songwriter
- Emily Smith (singer) (born 1981), Scottish folk singer
- Emily Wong (born 1990), Chinese singer and actress

=== Sportswomen ===
- Emily Allen (born 1992), Welsh footballer
- Emily Asquith (born 2003), English boxer
- Emily Bessoir (born 2001), German basketball player
- Emily Clark (born 1995), Canadian ice hockey player
- Emily Cross (born 1986), American foil fencer
- Emily Csikos (born 1988), Canadian water polo player
- Emily van Egmond (born 1993), Australian footballer
- Emily Gielnik (born 1992), Australian footballer
- Emily Gillam (born 1977), New Zealand field hockey player
- Emily Hallifax (born 2005), French diver
- Emily Harrop (born 1997), French ski mountaineer
- Emily Hughes (born 1989), American figure skater
- Emily Jacobson (born 1985), American saber fencer
- Emily Jing (born 2007), American foil fencer
- Emily Kukors (born 1985), American swimmer
- Emily LeSueur (born 1972), American synchronized swimmer
- Emily Lock (born 2007), British gymnast
- Emily Oberst (born 1998), American wheelchair basketball player
- Emily Samuelson (born 1990), American figure skater
- Emily Seebohm (born 1992), Australian swimmer
- Emily Silver (born 1985), American swimmer
- Emily Hood Westacott (1910–1980), Australian tennis player
- Emily Westwood (born 1984), English football player
- Emily Whitehead (born 2000), Australian artistic gymnast

=== Writers ===
- Emily Barton (born 1969), American novelist
- Emily Bazelon (born 1971), American journalist
- Emily Lucas Blackall (1832–1892), American writer, philanthropist
- Emily St. John Bouton (1837–1927), American educator, journalist, author, editor
- Emily Brontë (1818–1848), English novelist, author of Wuthering Heights
- Emily Carr (1871–1945), Canadian artist and writer
- Emily Thornton Charles (1845–1895), American poet, journalist, suffragist, newspaper founder
- Emily Dickinson (1830–1886), American poet
- Emily Steele Elliott (1836–1897), English religious writer
- Emily Gerard (1849–1905), Scottish author
- Emily Goodrich Smith (1830–1903), American newspaper correspondent
- Emily Gravett (born 1972), British children's author and illustrator
- Emily Grosholz (1950–2026), American poet and philosopher
- Emily Jashinsky, American journalist
- Emily Lowe (died 1882), British travel writer
- Emily Arnold McCully (born 1939), American children's author
- Emily Julian McManus (1865–1918), Canadian poet, author, and educator
- Emily Mkamanga (1949–2021), Malawian writer and social commentator
- Emily Cheney Neville (1919–1997), American author
- Emily Sullivan Oakey (1829–1883), American educator, author, poet, hymnist
- Emily Rebecca Page (1823–1908), American poet
- Emily Augusta Patmore (1824–1862), British author, Pre-Raphaelite muse, inspiration for poem The Angel in the House.
- Emily Perkins (novelist) (born 1970), New Zealand author
- Emily Jane Pfeiffer (1827–1890), Welsh poet, philanthropist
- Emily Post (1872–1960), American author on etiquette
- Emily Prager, American author and journalist
- Emily Lee Sherwood Ragan (1839–1916), American author, journalist
- Emily Smith (author), British children's author
- Emily Elizabeth Veeder (1841–1898), American author

=== Others ===
- Emily Ayckbowm (1836–1900), English founder of the Community of the Sisters of the Church
- Emily Bisharat (died 2004), Jordanian suffragette, philanthropist, and the first female lawyer in the Kingdom of Jordan
- Emily Blackwell (1826–1910), American academic
- Emily Blathwayt (1852–1940), British suffragette, mother of Mary Blathwayt
- Emily Rose Bleby (1849–1917), Jamaican-born British temperance reformer
- Emily Brooke (born 1985), British inventor
- Emmelia of Caesarea or Saint Emily (died 375), mother of Basil the Great
- Emily Callaway (fl.2022), American politician
- Emily Carmichael (born 1981), American film director, screenwriter, and animator
- Emily Parmely Collins (1814–1909), American suffragist, activist, writer
- Emily M. J. Cooley (1831–1917), American religious and temperance leader
- Emily Davison (1872–1913), British suffragette
- Emily Dievendorf, American politician
- Emily Donelson (1807–1836), daughter-in-law of and First Lady under Andrew Jackson
- Emily Greene Balch (1867–1961), American academic, pacifist and Nobel Laureate
- Emily Harris, terrorist with the Symbionese Liberation Army
- Emily Hobhouse (1860–1926), British welfare campaigner
- Emily Caroline Chandler Hodgin (1838–1907), American temperance reformer
- Emily Pangnerk Illuitok (1943–2012), Inuk artist
- Emily Jabbour, American politician
- Emily Jones (2013–2020), English murder victim
- Emily Kame Kngwarreye (1910–1996), indigenous Australian artist
- Emily L. Loveridge (1860–1941), American nurse, educator, school founder, and hospital superintendent
- Emily Waita Macharia (born 1979), Kenyan public relations officer
- Emily MacManus CBE (1886–1978), Matron Bristol Royal Infirmary then Guy's Hospital and President Royal College of Nursing
- Emily Nelson Ritchie McLean (1859–1916), American civic leader
- Emily Morse (born 1970), American sex therapist, author, and media personality
- Emily Murphy (1868–1933), Canadian feminist
- Emily Pankhurst (1858–1928), English political activist and leader of the British suffragette movement
- Emily Austin Perry (1795–1851), Texas historical figure
- Emily McGary Selinger (1848–1927), American painter, writer, poet, educator
- Emily Shenkl (1910–1996), a leader in the Indian Independence Movement
- Emily Sherwin, American law professor
- Emily Pitts Stevens (1841–1906), American educator, activist, editor, publisher
- Emily Stonington (1947–2019), American politician from Montana
- Emily "Cissy" Stuart (1914–1989), American newspaper owner and murder victim
- Emily Taylor (1795–1872), English schoolmistress, poet, children's writer, hymnwriter
- Emily Vontz (born 2000), German politician
- Emily Waheneka (1919–2008), Native American artist
- Emily Wong (born 1992), known as Emi Wong, Hong Kong YouTuber who makes fitness, lifestyle, and travelling videos
- Emily Kathryn Wyant (1897–1942), American mathematician
- Emily Young (born 1951), British sculptor
- Emily Young (film director) (born 1970), English film director and screenwriter
- Sagufta Yasmin Emily, Bangladesh Awami League politician and Member of Parliament

== Fictional characters ==
- Emily, Jessie's former toy owner in Toy Story
- Emily Arrow, main female character in Patricia Reilly Giff’s Polk Street School series
- Emily The Stirling Engine, a character in Thomas & Friends
- Emily Barham, the female lead in the 1964 film The Americanization of Emily, played by Julie Andrews
- Emily Bartlett, heroine of Beverly Cleary's Emily's Runaway Imagination
- Emily Bennett, in the CW fantasy-drama TV series The Vampire Diaries
- Emily Bennett, American Girl character, best friend of Molly McIntire
- Emily Bishop, in the British soap opera Coronation Street
- Emily Bradford Taylor, Gwyneth Paltrow's character in A Perfect Murder
- Emily Bung, in Carry On Screaming
- Emily Byrne, main character of the Absentia TV series
- Emily Charlton, a character in both the novel and the film in The Devil Wears Prada
- Emily Chester, title character of the 1864 American novel by Anne Moncure Crane
- Emily Cooper, main title character in the Netflix series Emily in Paris
- Emily Davis, one of eight protagonists in the survival horror game Until Dawn
- Emily Drozynski, main character in the western drama Yellowstone (American TV series)
- Emily Dyer, a survivor in the video game Identity V
- Emily Elephant, a character in the British cartoon preschool series Peppa Pig
- Emily-Elizabeth, in the PBS animated preschool TV and book series Clifford the Big Red Dog, voiced by Grey DeLisle
- Emily Eyefinger, main character of the Emily Eyefinger series about a girl with an eye on her finger
- Emily Fields, major character in the TV series Pretty Little Liars
- Emily Fitch, in the TV series Skins
- Emily Gilmore, in the TV series Gilmore Girls
- Emily Grierson, main character of William Faulkner's short story "A Rose for Emily"
- Emily Kaldwin, in the Dishonored video game series
- Emily Leduc, D.W.'s friend in the animated series Arthur
- Emily Litella, a character created by comedian Gilda Radner in the TV comedy show Saturday Night Live
- Emily Merrimack, the title character from Corpse Bride. Though her surname is not mentioned, it was used in early scripts.
- Emily Morgen in the TV series Prison Break
- Emily Nelson, main character of the film A Simple Favour
- Emily Pollifax, heroine of The Mrs. Pollifax series of spy-mystery novels by Dorothy Gilman
- Emily Prentiss, on the CBS crime drama Criminal Minds
- Emily Quartermaine, in the ABC soap opera General Hospital
- Emily Ramirez, a character in Close Enough
- Emily Rose, the lead character of the film Exorcism of Emily Rose
- Emily Byrd Starr, heroine of L. Maud Montgomery's Emily of New Moon novels
- Emily Stewart, in The Idolmaster Million Live!
- Emily Thorne, main character in the TV drama Revenge
- Emily Valentine, in Beverly Hills, 90210
- Emily Waltham, Ross's second wife in the NBC sitcom Friends
- Emily Weiss, from the 1981 musical satire film Shock Treatment
- Emily Willow, in the film Barbie: Princess Charm School
- Emily Windsnap, main character in a series of novels by Liz Kessler
- Emily Young, in Twilight (novel series)
- Emily Zhang, mother of Frank Zhang in The Heroes of Olympus
- Emily, a non-playable Mii opponent in the Wii series
- Emily, in the Nickelodeon TV series Power Rangers Samurai
- Emily, a.k.a. Miyuki Hoshizora, protagonist of Glitter Force/Smile PreCure!
- Emily, a character in Little Bear
- Emily the Emerald Fairy, in the Rainbow Magic book franchise
- Emily the Seraph, a supporting character in the animated series Hazbin Hotel
- Emily the Strange, a cartoon character and merchandising mascot
- See Emily Play, a song by rock band Pink Floyd,

== See also ==
- Amelia (given name)
- Emil (given name)
- Emilee (given name)
- Emilia (given name)
- Émilie, a French feminine given name
- Emilie Meng (1998–2016), Danish teenager who was murdered
- Emilio (given name)
- Emma (given name)
