= Emilee (given name) =

Emilee is a feminine given name and variant of Emily.

Emilee may refer to:

- Emilee Anderson, American ski jumper
- Emilee Cherry (born 1992), Australian Rugby Union player
- Emilee Flood, singer known by the mononym Emilee, famous for being featured in "ILY (I Love You Baby)"
- Emilee Klein (born 1974), American golfer and golf coach
- Emilee O'Neil (born 1983), American soccer
- Emilee Wallace (born 1989), American actress

== See also ==
- Emily (given name)
- Emil (given name)
- Emilia (given name)
- Émilie
- Emelie
