= Camilla (given name) =

- Pronunciation: /kəˈmiːlə/ kə-MEE-lə; /kəˈmɪlə/ kə-MIL-ə
- Gender: Female

Origin
- Meaning: "acolyte" (young cult officiant); a Latin cognomen

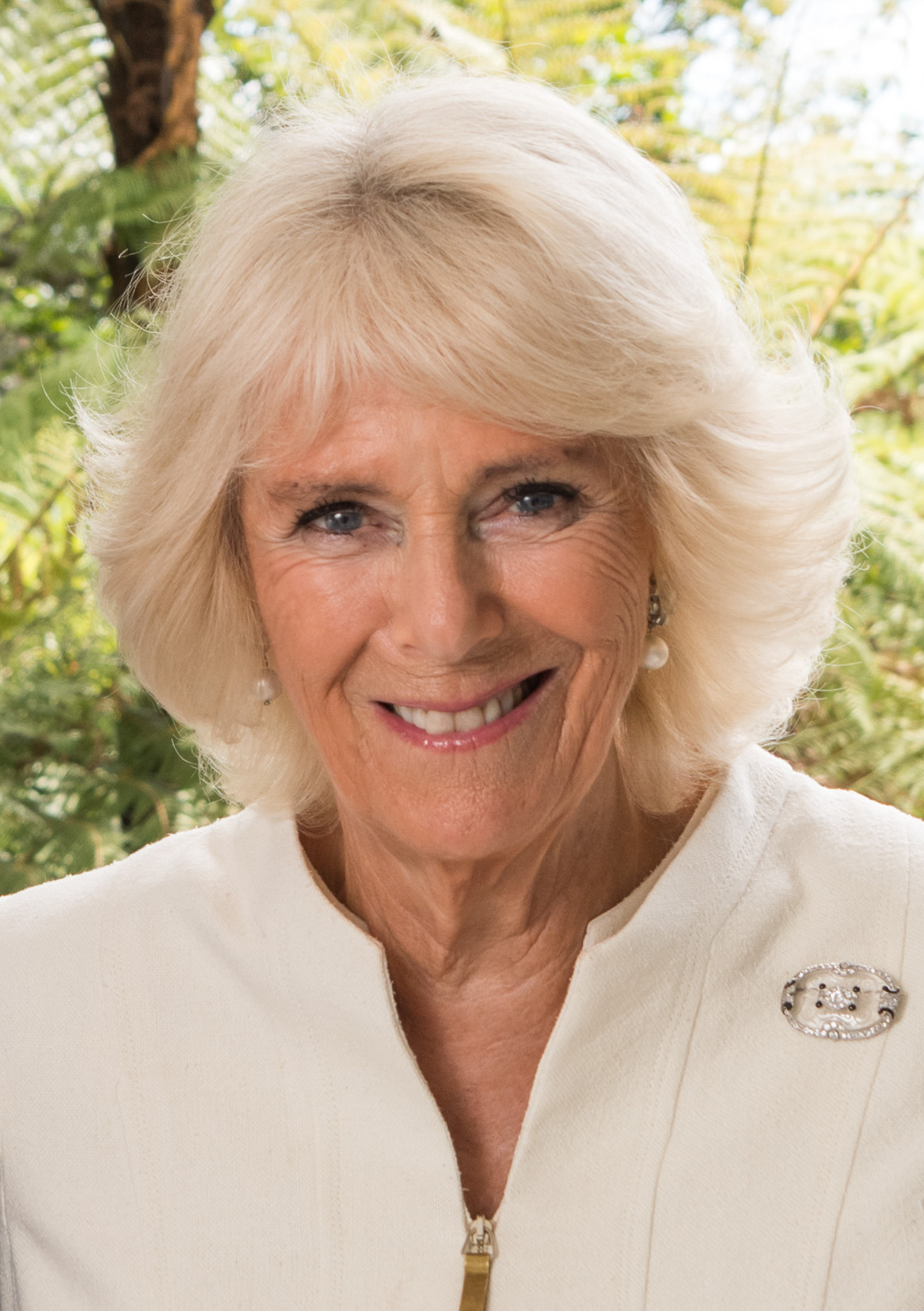
Queen Camilla is the Queen consort of the United Kingdom and Commonwealth realms and as the wife of King Charles III.

Camilla or Camila is a feminine given name. It originates as the feminine of camillus, a term for a youth serving as acolyte in the ritual of ancient Roman religion, which may be of Etruscan origin. Hypocorisms of the name include Milly, Millie, and Milla.

== History ==
The name Camillo is the Italian male version of Camilla. Camillus came to be used as a cognomen in Rome, and Camilla would be the feminine form of this cognomen from a period when cognomina had become hereditary clan names. The most notable bearer of this name in Roman history is Marcus Furius Camillus (c. 446 – 365 BC), who according to Livy and Plutarch, triumphed four times, was five times dictator, and was honoured with the title of "Second Founder of Rome". In the Aeneid, Camilla was the name of a queen of the Volsci who was given as a servant to the goddess Diana and raised as a "warrior virgin" of the Amazon type.

In the English-speaking world, the name was popularized by Fanny Burney's novel Camilla of 1796. The given names Kamilla and Kamila are variations of the given name Camilla. Both Kamila and Kamilla have roots in Latin, Slavic (its forms Mila and Milla), Arabic, and South Asian languages and today remain popular in Eastern Europe (Mila and Milla among Christian, Camila among Muslims), Scandinavia, and Italy. The name Kamila in Arabic means perfect derived from the Arabic root Kamil (كامل and كميل) and is a variation on the Sanskrit name Kamala, meaning lotus, a common name in Indian culture

== Popularity ==
The name, with the spelling Camila, has been particularly popular among Spanish speakers. Camila was among the five most popular names for Hispanic newborn girls in the American state of Virginia in 2022 and 2023.

== People with the given name Camilla ==
- Queen Camilla (born 1947), wife of King Charles III
- Camilla Araujo (born 2002), American influencer and ex-OnlyFans content creator
- Camilla Arfwedson (born 1981), British actress
- Camilla Battista da Varano (1458–1524), Italian princess, nun, and saint
- Camilla Marie Beeput (born 1984), British singer
- Camilla Belle (born 1986), American actress
- Camilla Bini (born 1994), Italian rhythmic gymnast
- Camilla Bloch (born 1970), British barrister
- Camilla Brodin (born 1979), Swedish politician
- Camilla Brunsberg (born 1972), Swedish politician
- Camilla Cavendish, Baroness Cavendish of Little Venice (born 1968), British journalist and former policy advisor
- Camilla Collett (1813–1895), Norwegian writer and feminist
- Camilla Dallerup (born 1974), British-based Danish ballroom dancer
- Camilla D'Errico (born 1980), Italian-Canadian visual artist
- Camilla Dufour Crosland (1812–1895), English writer
- Camilla Dufour (17??–1846), British singer, writer and teacher of chess
- Camilla Eibenschütz (1884–1958), German stage actress
- Camilla Erculiani (died c. 1584), Italian apothecary tried by the Roman Inquisition
- Camilla Filippi (born 1979), Italian film, stage and television actress
- Camilla Franks (born 1976), Australian fashion designer
- Camilla George (born 1988), Nigerian-born British jazz saxophonist, composer and band leader
- Camilla Guerrieri (1628–after 1693), Italian painter
- Camilla Henemark (born 1964), Swedish singer
- Camilla Herrem (born 1986), Norwegian handball player
- Camilla Johansson (swimmer) (born 1974), Swedish swimmer
- Camilla Johansson (triple jumper) (born 1976), Swedish triple jumper
- Camilla Kerslake (born c. 1988), English mezzo-soprano
- Camilla Läckberg, (born 1974), Swedish author
- Camilla Leung, Hong Kong international lawn bowler
- Camilla Long (born 1978), British journalist for The Sunday Times
- Camilla Luddington (born 1983), British actress
- Camilla Martelli (c. 1545 – 1590), first the lover and then the second wife of Cosimo I de' Medici, Grand Duke of Tuscany
- Camilla Mårtensen (born 1970), Swedish politician
- Camilla Martin (born 1974), retired badminton player from Denmark
- Camilla Rinaldo Miller (born 1969), Swedish politician
- Camilla Odhnoff (1928–2013), Swedish politician
- Lady Camilla Osborne (born 1950), only child of the 11th Duke of Leeds
- Camilla Poindexter (born 1986), American reality television personality and model
- Camilla Rodolfi (fl. 1449), Italian commander of a group of women
- Camilla Rothe (born 1947), German physician and tropical medicine specialist
- Camilla Rutherford (born 1976), English actress and fashion model
- Camilla Scott (born 1962), Canadian actress and television host
- Camilla Søeberg (born 1966), Danish actress
- Camilla Sparv (born 1943), Swedish actress
- Camilla Tominey (born 1978), British journalist.

== People with the given name Camila ==
- Camila Alves (born 1982), Brazilian-American model and designer
- Camila Batmanghelidjh (1963–2024), British businesswoman, founder and chief executive of mismanaged and defunct charity Kids Company
- Camila Bordonaba (born 1984), Argentinian actress and musician
- Camila Brait (born 1988), Brazilian volleyball player
- Camila Cabello (born 1997), Cuban-American singer-songwriter and former Fifth Harmony member
- Camila María Concepción (1991–2020), American screenwriter and transgender rights activist
- Camila Ferezin (born 1977), Brazilian rhythmic gymnast and coach
- Camila Giorgi (born 1991), Italian tennis player
- Camila Jourdan (born 1980), Brazilian philosopher and activist
- Camila Loboguerrero (1941–2025), Colombian film director
- Camila Martins Pereira (born 1994), Brazilian footballer
- Camila Mendes (born 1994), Brazilian-American actress
- Camila Pitanga (born 1977), Brazilian film and television actress
- Camila Rossi (born 1999), Brazilian rhythmic gymnast
- Camila Santos (born 2000), Brazilian footballer
- Camila Silva (tennis) (born 1992), Chilean tennis player
- Camila Silva (singer) (born 1994), Chilean singer-songwriter
- Camila Sodi (born 1986), Mexican singer, actress and model
- Camila Vezzoso (born 1993), Uruguayan model crowned Miss Uruguay 2012

== People with the given name Ćamila ==
- Ćamila Mičijević (born 1994), Bosnian-Croatian handball player

== People with the given name Kimila ==
- Kimila Ann Basinger (born 1953), American actress

== Fictional characters ==
- Camilla (muppet), a Muppet character
- Camilla (Castlevania), aka Carmilla, character in the Castlevania series
- Camilla Hect, a secondary character in The Locked Tomb series
- Camilla Macaulay, a character in The Secret History
- Camilla Noakes (née Fortescue-Cholmondeley-Browne), a character in the TV series Call the Midwife
- Camila Santiago, a character in the TV series Brooklyn Nine-Nine
- Camila Torres, a character in the TV series Violetta
- Camilla Traynor, a character in the film Me Before You
- Princess Camila, a character in the show Sofia the First: Royal Magic

== See also ==
- Kamilla (given name)
- Camille (given name)
- Camilla (disambiguation)
- Camila (disambiguation)
