= Milly (disambiguation) =

Milly is a feminine given name.

Milly may also refer to:

== Places in France ==
- Milly, Manche, a town in Normandy
- Milly, a former commune integrated into the commune of Chablis
- Milly, a village in the commune of Lucinges

== Other uses ==
- Milly (actress), stage name of Carla Mignone (1905–1980)
- Milly (fashion brand), a womenswear line designed by Michelle Smith
- AEC Militant, a post-war artillery tractor nicknamed "Milly"

== See also ==
- Millie, a feminine given name
- Milly Milly, a sheep and cattle station in Western Australia
- Milly-la-Forêt, a town in Île-de-France, near Paris
- Milly-Lamartine, a town in eastern France
- Milly-sur-Bradon, a town in north-eastern France
- Milly-sur-Thérain, a town in northern France
- Milly-le-Meugon, a village now attached to the city of Gennes, in Western France
- Jacques de Milly (died 1461), 37th Grand Master of the Order of the Knights Hospitaller
- Philip of Milly (c. 1120–1171), baron in the Kingdom of Jerusalem and seventh Grand Master of the Knights Templar
- Robert of Milly (fl. 1161–1238), chamberlain of the County of Champagne and Knight Templar
- Stephanie of Milly (c. 1145/1155–c. 1197), an influential figure in the Kingdom of Jerusalem, daughter of Philip of Milly
- Stephanie of Milly, Lady of Gibelet, 12th century noblewoman, first cousin of the above
