= Seedorf, Segeberg =

Seedorf
- Municipality
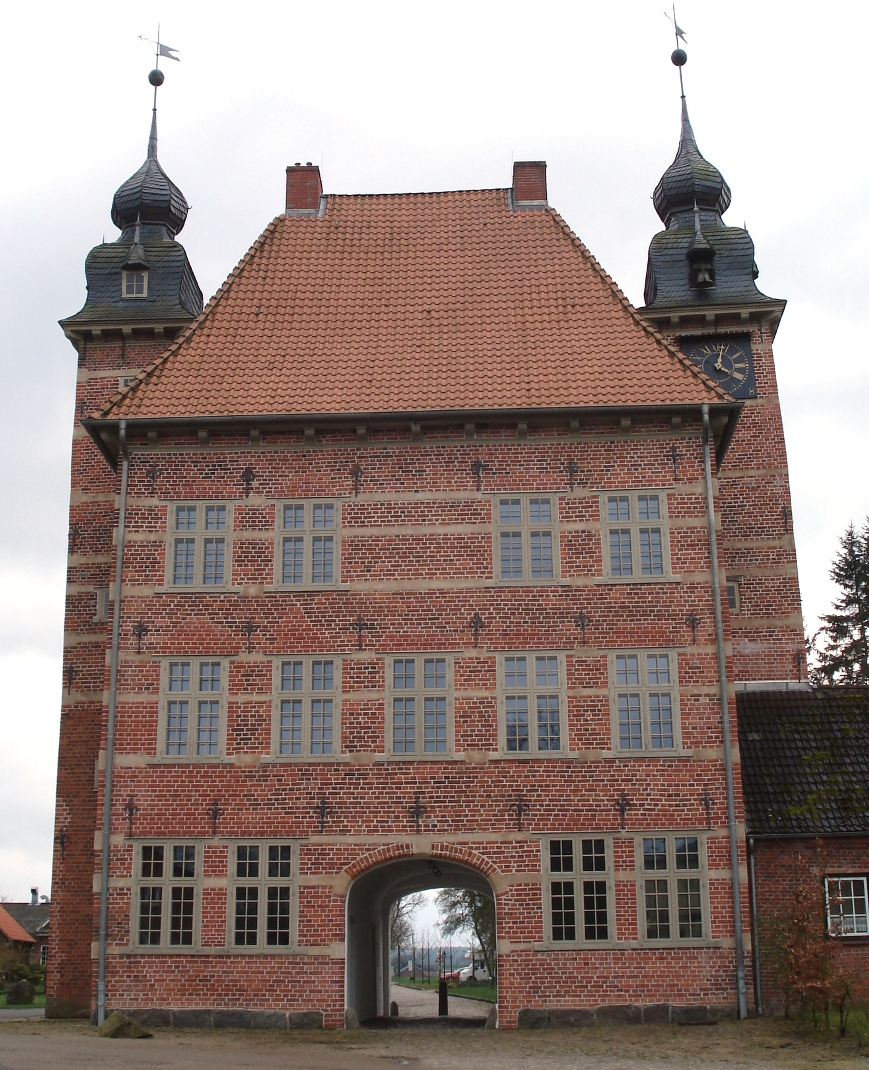
- The Torhaus, town's symbol

- Coat of arms

- Location of Seedorf within Segeberg district
- Interactive map of Seedorf
- Location within Germany Location within Schleswig-Holstein
- Coordinates: 54°3′0″N 10°25′1″E
- Country: Germany
- State: Schleswig-Holstein
- District: Segeberg
- Municipal assoc.: Trave-Land

Government
  - Mayor: Gerd Lentföhr (CDU)

Area
  - Total: 48.94 km^{2} (18.90 sq mi)
- Elevation: 30 m (98 ft)

Population (2025-12-31)
  - Total: 2,193
  - Density: 44.81/km^{2} (116.1/sq mi)
- Time zone: UTC+01:00 (CET)
  - Summer (DST): UTC+02:00 (CEST)
- Postal codes: 23823
- Dialling codes: 04555, 04559
- Vehicle registration: SE
- Website: Official website

Seedorf (German pronunciation: [ˈzeːdɔʁf]) is a municipality in the district of Segeberg, in Schleswig-Holstein, Germany.

== Geography ==
Out of the Seedorf village, the municipality counts 11 civil parishes (Ortsteile):

- Aukamp
- Bahrenkrug (with Blomnath and Heidmoor)
- Berlin
- Fresenfelde
- Hornsmühlen
- Kembs
- Kuhlenbrook
- Schlamersdorf (with Reuterteich and Schulbusch)
- Seekamp
- Weitewelt

== Personalities ==
- Ernest Charles Jones (1819-1869), English poet, novelist, and Chartist, native of the village of Berlin
- Emilie Tegtmeyer (1827–1903), German historian and writer, born in Hornsmühlen.
