= Milly =

Milly is a feminine given name. It is often short for Mildred, Amelia, Emily, Millicent, Camilla, Camila, Camille, Camile, Emilia, etc. It may refer to:

== People ==
- Milly Alcock (born 2000), Australian actress
- Milly Babalanda (born 1970), Ugandan politician
- Milly Bernard (1920–2005), American politician
- Milly Childers (1866–1922), English painter
- Milly Clark (born 1989), Australian long-distance runner
- Milly Dowler (1988–2002), murdered English schoolgirl
- Milly Durrant (born 1985), Welsh former footballer
- Milly Johnson (born 1964), British romance novelist
- Milly Mathis (1901–1965), French actress, mainly in films, born Emilienne Pauline Tomasini
- Milly Quezada (born 1955), Latin American singer
- Milly Ristvedt (born 1942), Canadian abstract painter
- Milly Scott (born 1933), Dutch actress and singer born Marion Henriette Louise Molly in 1933
- Milly Shapiro (born 2002), American stage actress and singer
- Milly Steger (1881–1948), German sculptor
- Milly Vitale (1933–2006), Italian actress
- Milly Witkop (1877–1955), Ukrainian-born Jewish anarcho-syndicalist and feminist writer and activist
- Milly D'Abbraccio, an Italian porn actress who acts in the Milf genre
- Milly Zero (born 1999), English actress

== Fictional characters ==
- Amelia "Milly" Michaelson, a character in 1986 American fantasy drama film The Boy Who Could Fly
- Milly Pontipee, female lead character of the 1954 film Seven Brides for Seven Brothers and Seven Brides for Seven Brothers (musical)
- Milly Bloom, who does not actually appear in the James Joyce novel Ulysses other than through recollections and letters
- Milly Theale, a major character in the Henry James novel The Wings of the Dove
- Milly, a Fireside Girl from the Disney animated television series Phineas and Ferb
- Duchess Milly Graham de Vanily, Adrien's grandmother from the animated television series Miraculous: Tales of Ladybug & Cat Noir

== Other ==
- Milly (dog), the world's smallest dog by height

== See also ==
- Millie
