= Emilija =

Emīlija or Emilija is a given name. Notable people with the name include:

- Emilija Baranac (born 1994), Canadian actress and model
- Emīlija Benjamiņa (1881–1941), Latvian businesswoman in publishing
- Emilija Bērziņa, Latvian singer
- Emilija Stojmenova Duh (born 1985), Macedonian-Slovenian electrical engineer and politician
- Emilija Erčić (born 1962), former Yugoslav handball player
- Emīlija Gruzīte (1873–1945), Latvian painter
- Emīlija Gudriniece (1920–2004), Soviet and Latvian chemist specializing in organic synthesis
- Emilija Jakšić (1924–1949), Serbian communist
- Emilija Kokić (born 1968), Croatian singer
- Emilija Manninen (born 1981), Estonian hurdler
- Emilija Nikolova (born 1991), Bulgarian volleyball player
- Emilija Plater (1806–1831), Polish–Lithuanian noblewoman and revolutionary
- Emilija Podrug (born 1979), Croatian female basketball player
- Emilija Redžepi, Kosovan Bosniak politician in the Assembly of the Republic of Kosovo
- Emilija Škarnulytė (born 1987), visual artist and filmmaker
- Emīlija Šmite (1899–1977), Latvian chess player
- Emīlija Sonka (born 1939), former track and road cyclist from Latvia
- Emilija Spudaitė-Gvildienė (1887–1965), Lithuanian educator and politician
- Emīlija Veinberga (1896–1989), Latvian Communist politician
- Emilija Vileišienė (1861–1935), Lithuanian activist

== See also ==
- Emil (disambiguation)
- Emilia (disambiguation)
