= Gierczak =

Gierczak is a surname of Polish origin. Notable people with the surname include:

- Emilia Gierczak (1925–1945), Polish soldier
- Piotr Gierczak (born 1976), Polish footballer and manager
