= Emelie =

Emelie, Emélie or Emmelie is a feminine given name. Notable people with the name are:

- Emelie Andersson (born 1996), Swedish footballer
- Emelie Berggren, Swedish ice hockey player
- Emelie C. S. Chilton (1838–1864), American poet, magazine editor
- Emelie Forsberg (born 1986), Swedish trailrunner and ski mountaineer
- Emmelie Konradsson, Swedish footballer
- Emelie Lövgren (born 1990), Swedish footballer
- Emelie Melville (1852–1932), American actress
- Emelie Öhrstig (born 1978), Swedish cross-country skier
- Emelie Ölander (born 1989), Swedish footballer
- Emelie Petz, German gymnast
- Emélie Polini (1881–1927), English actress
- Emelie Tracy Y. Swett (1863–1892), American poet, author and editor
- Emelie Wikström, Swedish alpine skier

== See also ==
- Emilie (disambiguation)
- Emilia (disambiguation)
- Emily (disambiguation)
