= Emelia (given name) =

Emelia is a feminine first name. Notable people with it are:

== First name ==
- Emelia Arthur, Ghanaian politician
- Emelia Benjamin, American cardiologist
- Emelia Brobbey (born 1982), Ghanaian actress
- Emelia Burns (born 1982), Australian actress
- Ninón Sevilla (Emelia Pérez Castellanos; 1921–2015), Cuban-Mexican actress
- Emelia Coloma (born 1988), Ecuadorian former footballer
- Emelia Gorecka (born 1994), British runner
- Emelía Ósk Gunnarsdóttir (born 1998), Icelandic basketball player
- Emelia Russell Gurney (1823–1896), English activist
- Emelia Hartford (born 1993, American race car driver
- Emelia Jackson (born c.1989), Australian pastrycook
- Emelia Perry (born 1992), American paratriathlete
- Emelia Quinn (born 1992), British scholar
- Em Rusciano, Australian comedian
- Emelia Christine Schaub (1891–1995), American lawyer
- Emelia Yassir (born 2003), Australian rules footballer

== Middle name ==
- Mary Emelia Mayne (1858–1940), Australian philanthropist
- Laura Emelia Naplin (1893–1985), American politician
- Lisa Emelia Svensson, Swedish diplomat

== See also ==
- Amelia (given name)
- Emilia (given name)
