= Émilie =

- Pronunciation: French pronunciation: [emili] English pronunciation:/ˈɛməliː/
- Gender: Female

Origin
- Origin: French via Latin; female variation of Emil, derived from Aemilius
- Meaning: Rival
- Region of origin: Europe, North America, Australia

Other names
- Related names: Emily, Emilia

Émilie (French pronunciation: [emili]) is a French female given name. It is the feminine form of the male name Émile.

People named Émilie and Emilie include:

- Émilie Ambre (1849–1898), French opera singer
- Emilie Autumn (born 1979), American singer-songwriter, poet, author and violinist
- Emilie Bergbom (1834−1905), Finnish theater director
- Émilie Bigottini (1784–1858), French dancer
- Émilie Bonnivard (born 1980), French politician
- Émilie Marie Bouchaud aka Polaire (1874–1939), French singer and actress
- Emilie Bullowa (1869–1942), American lawyer
- Emilie Chandler (born 1983), French politician
- Émilie Charmy (1878–1974), artist in France's early avant-garde
- Émilie du Châtelet (1706–1749), French mathematician, physicist and author
- Émilie Claudette Chauchoin, birth name of Claudette Colbert (1903–1996), American actress
- Émilie Contat (1770–1846), French stage actress
- Emilie Davis (1839-1889), American diarist
- Émilie Deleuze (born 1964), French film director and screenwriter
- Émilie Dequenne (born 1981), Belgian actress
- Émilie Dionne (1934–1954), one of the Dionne quintuplets
- Émilie Fer (born 1983), French slalom canoeist
- Emilie da Fonseca (1803–1884), Norwegian-Danish stage actor and opera singer
- Emilie Fryšová (1840–1920), Czech teacher, ethnographer and writer
- Émilie Gamelin (1800–1851), Canadian social worker and Roman Catholic nun
- Émilie Gomis (born 1983), French-Senegalese professional basketball player
- Emilie Haavi, Norwegian footballer
- Emilie Hammarskjöld (1821–1854), composer
- Emilie Virginia Haynsworth (1916–1985), American mathematician
- Emilie Hesseldal (born 1990), Danish basketball player
- Emilie Högquist (1812–1846), actress
- Émilie Heymans (born 1981), Canadian diver
- Émilie L'Huillier
- Emilie Kahn, Canadian musician
- Emilie Pavlína Věnceslava Kittlová, birth name of Emmy Destinn (1878–1930), Czech opera singer
- Emilie Krasnow, American politician from Vermont
- Emilie Charlotte Le Breton, birth name of Lillie Langtry (1853–1929), British socialite, stage actress and producer
- Émilie Lavoie (born 2001), Canadian ice hockey player
- Emilie Lennert (1931–2019), Greenlandic politician
- Émilie Le Pennec (born 1987), French gymnast
- Emilie Livingston (born 1983), Canadian rhythmic gymnast, dancer, aerialist and contortionist
- Émilie Loit (born 1979), retired French professional female tennis player
- Émilie Mannering, Canadian filmmaker
- Emilie Mechelin (1838—1917), Finnish opera singer and singing teacher
- Émilie Mondor (1981–2006), Canadian Olympic athlete
- Émilie Tran Nguyen (born 1985), French journalist
- Émilie Pellapra (1806–1871), possibly an illegitimate daughter of Napoleon I by Françoise-Marie LeRoy
- Emilie Rathou (1862–1948), Swedish temperance and feminist activist, journalist and newspaper editor
- Emilie de Ravin (born 1981), Australian actress
- Emilie Risberg (1815–1890), Swedish girls' education reformer and novelist
- Emilie Rosing (1783–1811), Danish singer and stage actress
- Emilie Schindler (1907–2002), wife of Oskar Schindler and humanitarian
- Emilie Schytte (born 1993), Danish politician
- Émilie Simon (born 1978), French singer and composer of electronic music
- Emilie Spaulding (1896–1988), American politician
- Emilie Tegtmeyer (1827–1903), German writer and historian
- Émilie Vina (born 1982), French cross-country skier
- Emilie Walbom (1858–1932), Danish ballet dancer and choreographer

Fictional characters named Émilie and Emilie include:

- Emilie, a character in 2020 video game Genshin Impact
- Emilie-Sophie de Belmond, a character in 2018 video game CrossCode

== See also ==
- Emily (given name)
- Emelie, a given name
