= Emlyn (disambiguation) =

Emlyn is one of the seven districts of the Kingdom of Dyfed. It is a Welsh name and may refer to:

== People with the given name ==
- Emlyn Aubrey (born 1964), American golfer
- Emlyn Crowther (born 1949) New Zealand drummer
- Emlyn Garner Evans (1910–1963), British barrister
- Emlyn Gwynne (1898–1962), Welsh rugby player
- Emlyn Hooson, Baron Hooson (1925–2012) Welsh politician
- Emlyn Hughes (1947–2004), English footballer
- Emlyn Jenkins (1910–1993), Welsh rugby player
- Emlyn John (1907–1962), Welsh footballer
- Emlyn Jones (born 1907) Welsh footballer
- Emlyn Morinelli McFarland, American actress
- Emlyn Rhoderick (1920–2007), Welsh physicist
- Emlyn Walters (1918–2001), Welsh rugby player
- Emlyn Watkins (1904–1978), Welsh rugby player
- Emlyn A. G. Watkins (1926–2010), Welsh police officer
- Emlyn Williams (1905–1987), Welsh writer
- Emlyn Williams (footballer, born 1903), Welsh football player for Hull City
- Emlyn Williams (footballer, born 1912), Welsh football player for Barnsley and Preston North End
- Emlyn Williams (trade unionist), Welsh trade union leader
- Emlyn Mulligan, Irish Gaelic footballer

== People with the surname ==
- Dafydd Emlyn, 17th-century Welsh poet
- Endaf Emlyn (born 1944), Welsh musician
- Henry Emlyn (1729–1815), English architect
- John Emlyn-Jones (1889–1952), Welsh politician
- Judith Emlyn Johnson (born 1936), American poet
- Sollom Emlyn (1697–1754), Irish legal writer
- Thomas Emlyn (1663–1741), English nonconformist

== Musicians ==
- Emlyn (singer), born as Margaret Peake

== Places ==
- Newcastle Emlyn, town in West Wales
- Newcastle Emlyn Castle, ruined castle
- Emlyn, Kentucky, census-designated place in Whitley County, Kentucky

== Other ==
- Viscount Emlyn, peerage title
- Emlyn Beagles, Welsh dog breed
- Emlyn Hughes International Soccer, computer game
- St Emlyn's, virtual hospital
- Ysgol Gyfun Emlyn, school in Newcastle Emlyn
- Newcastle Emlyn RFC
- Emlyn Hughes House
