= Emmy (disambiguation) =

The Emmy is an award that recognizes excellence in television.

Emmy or Emmie may also refer to:

- Emmy (given name) or Emmie, a given name and list of people with the name
- Emmie (singer) or Emma Sarah Morton-Smith (born 1977), English singer-songwriter
- Emmy (Armenian singer) (born 1984)
- Emmy (Norwegian singer) (born 2000)
- Emmy (film), a 1934 Hungarian comedy
- emmy (magazine), a television industry journal published by the Academy of Television Arts & Sciences
- Hurricane Emmy, a tropical storm in the 1976 Atlantic hurricane season

== See also ==
- Emmy the Great or Emma-Lee Moss (born c. 1984), English singer-songwriter
- Emy (disambiguation)
