= Emiri =

- Gender: Female

Origin
- Origin: Japanese
- Meaning: Different meanings depending on the kanji used

Other names
- Related names: Emilia; Emily

Emiri (written: 笑里, 英美里, 絵美里 or えみり in hiragana) is a feminine Japanese given name. Notable people with the name include:

- Emiri Henmi (辺見 えみり; born 1976), Japanese actress and singer
- Emiri Katō (加藤 英美里; born 1983), Japanese voice actress
- Emiri Miyamoto (宮本 笑里; born 1983), Japanese violinist
- Emiri Miyasaka (宮坂 絵美里; born 1984), Japanese model

== Fictional characters ==
- Emiri Kimidori (喜緑 江美里), a character in the light novel series Haruhi Suzumiya
