= Emilia Goggi =

Italian opera singer

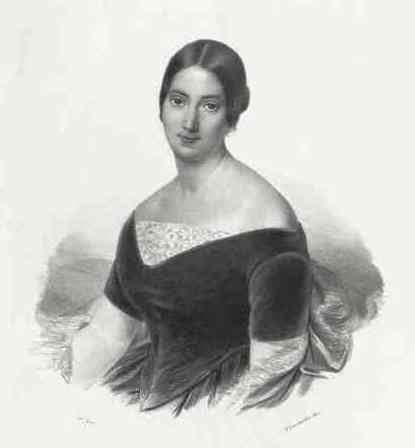
Emilia Goggi in 1848

Emilia Goggi, also known as Emilia Goggi-Marcovaldi, (10 October 1817 – 29 August 1857) was an Italian operatic mezzo-soprano who sang in the leading opera houses of Italy as well as in Spain. In 1853 she created the role of Azucena in the world premiere of Verdi's Il trovatore.

== Life and career ==
Emilia Goggi was born in Prato. Her hyphenated family name was the result of the intermarriage in the late 18th century of two noble families in that city, the Goggi and the Marcovaldi. She showed an early musical talent and at the age of six was enrolled in the Conservatorio di Santa Caterina where she studied singing with Giuseppe Orlandi. She made her first public appearance at the age of 18 singing the soprano aria "Casta diva" from Bellini's Norma in a concert given by the conservatory. She went on to further study with Antonio Giuliani in Florence and began appearing on stage in secondary soprano roles.

In 1841 she made her debut at La Fenice in Venice, singing the role of Adalgisa in Norma to great success; she was thereafter engaged to sing leading roles in theatres throughout Northern Italy. She also sang in Barcelona in 1845 as Abigaille in Nabucco and in 1846 as Elvira in Ernani. The extension of her vocal range and the dark timbre of her voice ultimately led her to the mezzo-soprano repertoire, and in 1853 she created the role of Azucena in the world premiere of Verdi's Il trovatore at the Teatro Apollo in Rome, reprising the role later that year in Florence and then in Turin and Naples in 1854 and in Pisa in 1856.

In addition to Azucena, Goggi also created the roles of Diomira in Fabio Campana's Giulio d'Este (Teatro degli Avvalorati, Livorno, 28 August 1841) and Erminia in Josep Piqué i Cerveró's Ernesto, duca di Sicilia (Teatro Principal, Barcelona, 4 November) 1844). Goggi died suddenly in Florence in 1857 at the age of 39 while preparing for a singing tour to England and was buried in the family tomb in the cloister of the Chiesa di Sant'Agostino in the nearby town of Prato. She never married.
