= Ernest Charles Jones =

English poet, novelist, and activist

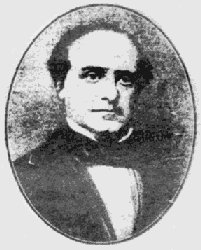
- Born: 25 January 1819; Berlin (Seedorf)
- Died: 26 January 1869 (aged 50)
- Occupation: barrister
- Writing career
- Genres: poetry novel
- Notable work: The Maid of Warsaw

Ernest Charles Jones (25 January 1819 – 26 January 1869) was an English poet, novelist and Chartist. Dorothy Thompson points out that Jones was born into the landed gentry, became a barrister, and left a large documentary record. "He is the best-remembered of the Chartist leaders, among the pioneers of the modern Labour movement, and a friend of both Marx and Engels."

== Early life ==
Jones was born on 25 January 1819 in Berlin (Seedorf), while his parents were visiting the Prussian court. He was the son of a British Army Major named Charles Gustavus Jones, equerry to the Duke of Cumberland, afterwards King of Hanover. In 1838 Jones came to England, and in 1841 published anonymously The Wood-Spirit, a romantic novel. This was followed by some songs and poems. He entered the Middle Temple in 1841 and on 20 April 1844 he was called to the bar.

== Chartism ==
In 1845, he joined the Chartist agitation, quickly becoming its most prominent figure, and vigorously carrying on the party's campaign on the platform and in the press. His speeches, in which he openly advocated physical force, led to his prosecution, and he was sentenced in 1848 to two years' imprisonment for seditious speeches. While in prison he wrote, it is said in his own blood on leaves torn from a prayer-book, The Revolt of Hindostan, an epic poem.

Upon his release from prison, he conducted a Chartist newspaper: the Notes to The People (1850–1852). He became a leading figure in the "National Charter Association" in the phase of its decline, together with his friend George Julian Harney, and helped to give the Chartist movement a clearer socialist direction. Following the closing of Notes to The People, Jones launched another Chartist publication, the People's Paper in May 1852.

Jones knew Karl Marx (Note: There are 52 letters from Ernest Jones to Marx between 1851 and 1868 kept.) and Friedrich Engels (Note: There are eight letter from Ernest Jones to Engels between 1852 and 1867 kept) personally. Marx and Engels at the same time commented on the Chartist movement and Jones' work in their letters and articles: Marx described Jones as "the most talented, consistent and energetic representative of Chartism". Marx also contributed to Notes to The People: two articles on the French Revolution of 1848 were credited to him, he co-authored six more with Jones, and according to Marx, he also made contributions to all articles on economics published in the paper from 1851 to 1852, which constituted two-thirds of articles appearing in the publication. He also contributed 25 articles to the People's Paper. Jones, a strident anti-imperialist, has been credited as an influence on Marx's views regarding colonialism, which shifted during the 1850s from seeing imperialism as a progressive, modernising force to regarding it as having a destructive effect on colonised societies: Jones' imprisonment had come about after he had given a speech in east London advocating for the end of British rule in Ireland, and wrote a series of articles in the People's Paper in 1853 expressing the hope that the sepoys of the presidency armies would revolt against Company rule in India, prefiguring the Indian Rebellion of 1857 by four years.

However, Jones was almost the National Charter Association's only public speaker; he was out of sympathy with the other leading Chartists, and soon joined the advanced Radical party. Jones was a member of the Manchester section of the International Workingmen's Association.

== Return to Convention ==
Afterwards, when the political and social agitation had died down, he returned to his practice as a barrister, which he had deserted, and also wrote largely. He produced a number of novels, including The Maid of Warsaw and Woman's Wrongs, also some poems, The Painter of Florence, The Battle Day (1855), The Revolt of Hindostan (1857), and Corayda (1859). Some of his lyrics, such as The Song of the Poor, The Song of the Day Labourers, and The Factory Slave, were well known.

== Death ==
He made several unsuccessful attempts to enter parliament and was about to contest Manchester, with the certainty of being returned, when he died in Ardwick, Manchester in 1869. He is buried in Ardwick Cemetery. He is believed to have sacrificed a considerable fortune rather than abandon his Chartist principles. His wife was Jane Atherley; and his son, Llewellyn Atherley-Jones, was a barrister and Liberal Member of Parliament.

== Works ==
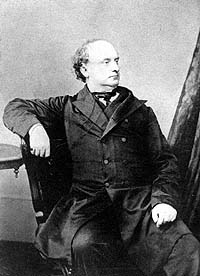
Photo of Jones

- Infantine effusions. F. H. Nestler, Hamburg 1830 Digitalisat
- The Wood-Spirit. A Novel. T. W. Boone, London 1841 Band 1 Digitalisat
- Fergus O'Connor, Ernst Charles Jones (Hrsg.): The Labourer; A monthly magazin of politics, literature, poetry & c. Bd. 1. Northern Star Office, Manchester 1847 Digitalisat
- Fergus O'Connor, Ernst Charles Jones (Hrsg.): The Labourer; A monthly magazin of politics, literature, poetry & c. Bd. 2. Northern Star Office, Manchester 1847 Digitalisat
- Fergus O'Connor, Ernst Charles Jones (Hrsg.): The Labourer; A monthly magazin of politics, literature, poetry & c. Nd. 3. Northern Star Office, Manchester 1848 Digitalisat
- Fergus O'Connor, Ernst Charles Jones (Hrsg.): The Labourer; A monthly magazin of politics, literature, poetry & c. Northern Star Office, Manchester 1848 Digitalisat
- Hrsg.: Notes to the People. The Champion of Political Justice and Universal Right. London May 1851 until 1858 Digitalisat 1851
- Co-operation. In: Notes to the People. Nro. 21. September, 20th 1851
- Three to One. In: Notes to the People. Nro. 26 25 September 1851
- What Is Kossuth? In: Notes to the People. Nro. 31 vom 29 November 1851
- Erklärung gegen Karl Heinzen. Übersetzt von Jenny Marx. London March 1852, 3rd.
- The Coming Crisis and why It Is Coming. In: Notes to the People. Nro. 16 August, 21st 1852
- The Storm's First Thunder. In: Notes to the People. Nro. 42 February, 19th 1853
- A Phamphlet on the „Revelations Concerning the Trial of the Communists at Cololone. In: Notes to the People. Nro. 47 26. 26 March 1853
- Secret Intrigue of Russian Tools, and Scandalous Doings of "Our" Cabinet in the East. In: Notes to the People. Nro. 86 24. Dezember, 24th 1853
- Different Features of Popular Feeling. In: Notes to the People. Nro. 103 April, 22nd 1854
- Discoveries Made Too Late. In: Notes to the People. Nro. 130 28. Oktober, 28th 1854
- The Maid of Warsaw, or the Tyrant Czar: a tale of the last Polish Insurrection. London 1854
- Woman's Wrongs. A series of tales. London 1855
- Evenings with the People. The Franchise and Taxation, an address. London 1856 Digitalisat
- Evenings with the people. The unemployed. London 1857
- The revolut of Hindostan; or the new world. A. poem. Wilson, London 1857
- Corayda. A Tale of Faith and Chivalry, and other poems. W. Kent & Co., London 1860 Digitalisat
- Communist Party of Great Britain History Group Corporation (Hrsg.): Diary of Ernest Jones 1839–47. Hammersmith, London 1961 (Our history 21)
