= Millie =

Millie is a feminine given name. It is often short for Emily, Millicent, Mildred, Camille, Camilla, Camila, Emilia, Maximillian, Malishka, or Amelia.

== People with the given name ==
Notable people with the given name include:

- Millie Bailey (1918–2022), American World War II veteran, civil servant, and volunteer
- Millie Bobby Brown (born 2004), English actress
- Millie Bright (born 1993), English footballer in the FA Women's Super League
- Millie Corretjer (born 1974), Puerto Rican singer and actress
- Millie Criswell (born 1948), American writer of romance novels
- Millie Davis (born 2006), Canadian actress
- Mildred Millie Deegan (1919–2002), American baseball player in the All-American Girls Professional Baseball League
- Millie DeLeon (c. 1873–1922), stage name of American burlesque dancer Millie Lawrence
- Millie Earl, British politician
- Millie Gamble (1887–1986), Canadian photographer
- Millie Gibson (born 2004), English actress
- Millie Goldsholl (1920–2012), American film director
- Millie Hamner, American politician, member of the Colorado State House of Representatives beginning 2010
- Millie Hudson (1902–1966), British diver, swimmer, diving coach and sports journalist
- Millie Hughes-Fulford (1945–2021), American medical investigator, molecular biologist and former NASA astronaut
- Millie Hylton (1870–1920), English actress and male impersonator
- Millie Innes (born 2000), Scottish actress
- Millie Jackson (born 1944), American singer-songwriter
- Millie Jeffrey (1910–2004), American activist and pioneer for workers', civil and women's rights, and union organizer
- Millie Kirkham (1923–2014), American singer born Millicent Eakes
- Millie Knight (born 1999), British Paralympic skier
- Millie McKoy (1851–1912), African-American conjoined twin
- Millie O'Connell (born 1996), English actress and singer
- Millie Peacock, Lady Peacock (1870–1948), first woman elected to the Parliament of Victoria, Australia
- Millie Perkins (born 1938), American actress
- Millie Puente (born 1958), American Latin jazz singer
- Mildred Lewis Rutherford (1851–1928), American educator and author nicknamed "Miss Millie"
- Millie Scott (fl. 1980s), American R&B singer
- Millicent Simmonds (born 2002/2003), deaf actor
- Millie Spalding (born 1998), British acrobatic gymnast
- Millie Small (1947–2020), Jamaican singer-songwriter
- Millie Tomlinson (born 1992), English professional squash player

== Fictional characters with the given name ==
- The title character of Meet Millie, a radio and television series of the 1950s
- The title character of Millie the Model, a comic book series
- Millie (Suikoden), in the video game Suikoden 2
- Millie the Echidna, one of the three official mascots of the 2000 Summer Olympic Games in Sydney
- Millie Dillmount, title character of the 1967 film Thoroughly Modern Millie and the 2002 Broadway musical
- Millie Frock, a character in Bob's Burgers
- Millicent Huxtable, in the television series One Tree Hill
- Millie Lammoreaux, in 3 Women, played by Shelley Duvall
- Millie Mouse, in the Mickey Mouse universe
- Millie, a principal character in the web series Helluva Boss
- Millicent Mudd, a character in the webcomic Ozy and Millie
- Millie Rusk, in the science-fiction comedy Free Guy
- Millicent Millie Tant, in the British comic Viz

== See also ==
- The dictionary definition of Millie at Wiktionary
- Milly, another feminine given name
