= Emilie (disambiguation) =

Émilie or Emilie is a feminine given name of French origin. It may also refer to:

- Émilie (opera), by Finnish composer Kaija Saariaho
- Les Filles de Caleb, original name of a Québec TV show, broadcast and marketed as Emilie for English audiences as well as Émilie, la passion d'une vie outside of Québec
- Émilie (1793 ship), a French corvette-built privateer based in Île de France (now Mauritius)
- Emilie (steamboat), an American sidewheel steamer which plied the Missouri River in the mid-19th century
- Emilie de Rochefort, a.k.a. Lili, from the Tekken fighting video game series

== See also ==
- Emilie Plantation, a Southern plantation with a historic house in Garyville, Louisiana, on the National Register of Historic Places
- Emily (disambiguation)
