= Boo Boo (dog) =

One-time world's smallest dog

- Species: Canis lupus familiaris
- Breed: Long-haired Chihuahua
- Sex: Female
- Known for: Smallest dog living (height)
- Title: Smallest dog living (height)
- Term: 12 May 2007 –
- Successor: Milly
- Owner: Lana Elswick
- Height: 10.16 cm (4 in)

Boo Boo was the world's smallest dog from 2007 to 2013. She stood at a height of 10.16 cm (4.00 in) according to the Guinness Book of World Records.

Boo Boo was replaced as the World's Smallest Dog by Milly, another Chihuahua who stood at 9.65 cm (3.80 in). Other contenders for the record included Beyoncé, a Dachshund-Chihuahua mix, and Scooter, a Maltese.

== See also ==
- List of individual dogs
