= Emy =

Emy or EMY may refer to:

== People with the given name Emy ==
- Emy Coligado (b. 1971), an American actress
- Emy Gauffin (1928–1993), a Swedish orienteering competitor
- Emy Gordon (1841−1901), a German writer, translator and Catholic activist
- Emy Jackson (b. 1945), a Japanese singer
- Emy Kat (b. 1959), a visual artist
- Emy Machnow (1897–1974), a Swedish freestyle swimmer
- Emy Morse (1918–2018), Haitian singer, dancer and folklorist
- Emy Pettersson (1908–1996), a Swedish sprinter
- Emy Roeder (1890–1971), a German sculptor
- Emy Storey (b. 1981), an American graphic designer and illustrator
- Emy Storm (1925–2014), a Swedish actress

== Other uses ==
- Classic Maya language (ISO 639-3 code: emy)
- El Minya Airport, El Minya, Egypt (IATA code: EMY)
- Emeryville station, California (station code: EMY)
- Emy (TV series), a Sri Lankan television series
- Ee.Ma.Yau, a 2018 Indian film
- EMY (Εθνική Μετεωρολογική Υπηρεσία), the Hellenic National Meteorological Service

== See also ==
- Emmy, an American television award
- Emmy (given name)
- Emmy (disambiguation)
