= Camilla Rothe =

German physician

- Born: September 20, 1974; Heidelberg, Germany
- Known for: COVID-19 in Germany
- Scientific career
- Fields: Physician and Tropical medicine specialist

Camilla Rothe (born 20 September 1974 in Heidelberg) is a German physician and tropical medicine specialist. She diagnosed the first confirmed case of COVID-19 in Germany, and her scientific work helped confirm that the virus could be transmitted asymptomatically. Time named her one of the 100 most influential people of the year in 2020, and her discovery has been credited with saving countless lives.

== Education ==
Camilla Rothe grew up in Heidelberg, where she attended the Kurfürst Friedrich Gymnasium and graduated at the top of her class. She studied medicine from 1994 to 2001 in Freiburg and Berlin. She worked as an assistant doctor at the Charité in Berlin, where she graduated as a specialist in internal medicine in 2008. In the same year she completed her doctorate. From 2009 to 2013 she worked at Queen Elizabeth Central Hospital Blantyre, in the south of Malawi. On her return, she continued to specialize in tropical medicine at the Bernhard Nocht Institute in Hamburg. From there she moved to the LMU Klinikum in Munich.

== Work on COVID-19 ==
On 27 January 2020, Rothe diagnosed the first confirmed case of COVID-19 in Germany. It was evident that the infection had come from a Chinese traveler who visited Germany without noticing any symptoms of the disease. Rothe and Michael Hölscher published this discovery on 30 January in The New England Journal of Medicine. Her published report was initially met with disbelief and denial. Thus began a two-month scientific dispute about when the disease can be transmitted from person to person, which ended with the confirmation of their findings.

In 2020, Time named her one of the 100 most influential people of the year. Professor of molecular medicine Eric Topol wrote that "her discovery has saved countless lives".

== Publications ==
- Clinical Cases in Tropical Medicine. Saunders, Philadelphia 2014. ISBN 978-0-7020-5824-0.
