= Emilia (given name) =

- Pronunciation: Eh-meal-ya or Em-i-lee-a
- Gender: Female

Origin
- Origin: Latin
- Meaning: Strength

Other names
- Nicknames: Emi, Emmy, Mia, Mily, Mila, Lia, Milia.
- Related names: Emily, Emilie, Emma, Em, Amelia, Amélie

Emilia is a female Italian given name of Latin origin. The name is popular all over Europe and the Americas. The corresponding male given name is Emilio. Emily is the English form of the Italian name.

== Etymology ==
The name is derived from Aemilia, the feminine form of the Latin nomen Aemilius. It is likely derived from the same root as the Latin word aemulus, which means to rival, excel, or emulate, but this may be a folk etymology.

Although similar Germanic names like Amalia may appear to be related to Emilia, Emily and Aemilia, they in fact have a different origin. In Greek, it is often written in the form "Αιμιλία" cognate to the Balkan Mountains of Haemus "Αίμος" and the ancient and modern greek word for blood "Αίμα".

== Popularity ==
As of 2010, records indicate that more than 13,500 girls in the United States have been named Emilia since 1880, with numbers increasing markedly from the year 2000. In 2022, it was the 46th most popular name given to girls in Canada.

== People with this name ==
- Emilia (Bulgarian singer) (born 1982), full name Emiliya Valeva, known by the mononym Emilia
- Emilia Attías (born 1987), Argentine actress and model
- Emilia Brodin (born 1990), Swedish footballer
- Emilia Broomé (1866–1925), Swedish politician
- Emilia Cano (born 1968), Spanish race walker
- Dorina Emilia Carbune (born 1985), Romanian handball player
- Emilia Clarke (born 1986), British actress
- Emília Coranty Llurià (1862–1944), Spanish painter
- Emilia Cortez, American politician
- Emilia Dafni (1881–1941), Greek writer
- Emilia Dayan (fl. 1870), Egyptian stage actress
- Emilia Dides (born 1999), Chilean singer, model and beauty pageant titleholder
- Emilia Dobreva Kosovo-born model, television personality, and beauty pageant titleholder who was the first representative of the United Arab Emirates in the Miss Universe pageant
- Emília Došeková (1937–2021), Slovak actress
- Emilia Fester (born 1998), German politician
- Emilia Fox (born 1974), British actress
- Emilia of Gaeta (died 1036), duchess of Gaeta
- Emilia Gierczak (1925–1945), Polish soldier
- Emilia Goggi (1817–1857), Italian operatic mezzo-soprano
- Emilia Hart, British-Australian author
- Emilia Heurich (1819–1905), Polish revolutionary, part of the 1863 January Uprising
- Emilia "Mimi" Jennewein (1920–2006), American painter
- Emilia Kilpua (born 1977), Finnish space scientist
- Emilia Lanier (1569–1645), English poet
- Emilia Larsson (born 1998), Swedish footballer
- Emilia Malessa (1909–1949), Polish soldier, member of the Home Army during WWII
- Emilia Morosini (1804–1875), Swiss cultural patron and patriot
- Emilia Müller (born 1951), German chemical technician and politician
- Emilia Nilsson (born 2003), Swedish diver
- Emilia Nyström (born 1983), Finnish beach volleyball player
- Emilia Obretenova (born 2007), Bulgarian rhythmic gymnast
- Emilia Papadopoulos (born 1987), Cypriot-British journalist
- Emilia Pardo Bazan (1851–1921), Spanish writer
- Emilia Pelgander (born 2004), Swedish footballer
- Emilia Pikkarainen (born 1992), Finnish swimmer
- Emilia Plater (1806–1831), Polish patriot and revolutionary
- Emilia Ramboldt (earlier Emilia Andersson) (born 1988), Swedish ice hockey player
- Emilia Rotter (1906–2003), Hungarian 4x world champion figure skater
- Emilia Ramboldt (born 1988), Swedish ice hockey player
- Emilia Rydberg (born 1978), Swedish pop singer
- Emilia Schüle (born 1992), Russian-born German actress
- Emilia Serrano de Wilson (1834–1923), Spanish writer, journalist, feminist, traveler
- Emilia Tsoulfa (born 1973), Greek sailor
- Emilia Uggla (1819–1855), Swedish pianist
- Emilia Unda (1879–1939), German actress
- Emília Vášáryová (born 1942), Slovak actress
- Emilia Vuorisalmi (born 1979), Finnish medical doctor, TV personality and entrepreneur
- Emilia Kaczorowska Wojtyla (1884–1929), the mother of Pope John Paul II
- Emilia Simonen (born 1996), Finnish figure skater
- Emilia Soini (born 1995), Finnish squash player
- Emilia Vesa (born 2001), Finnish ice hockey player
- Emília Zathureczky (1823–1905), Hungarian museologist, collector

=== Fictional characters ===
- Emilia, one of the seven women occurring in the character of narrators in The Decameron by Giovanni Boccaccio
- Emília, one of the main characters in the Brazilian children's novel series Sítio do Picapau Amarelo by Monteiro Lobato
- Emilia, a character from William Shakespeare's play Othello
- Emilia Galotti, virtuous young woman of the bourgeoisie from the play of the same name by Gotthold Ephraim Lessing
- Emilia Pérez, a transgender woman in Emilia Pérez
- Emilia Ridderfjell, a character from the novel series The Bert Diaries
- Emilia, from the indie visual novel Digital: A Love Story
- Emilia (Re:Zero), the female protagonist from the Japanese light novel series Re:Zero − Starting Life in Another World
- Emilia Justina, or Emi Yusa, the female protagonist from the Japanese light novel series The Devil Is a Part-Timer!
- Emilia Mansfield, a character from the Disney Channel Latin America series Soy Luna

== Variant forms ==
- Emily
- Emelia (given name)
