= Emily Lowe =

British travel writer (died 1882)

Helen Emily Lowe (died 21 March 1882 in Torquay) was a British travel writer. Lowe made travels to Scandinavia and southern Europe together with her mother. Her experiences were published in two books: Unprotected Females in Norway, or the Pleasantest Way of Travelling There, Passing through Denmark and Sweden. 1857, G. Routledge & Co. and Unprotected Females in Sicily, Calabria and on the Top of Mount Aetna. 1859, G. Routledge & Co.

When travelling, Lowe intentionally brought a minimum of luggage. In her first book she writes: “The only use of a gentleman in travelling is to look after the luggage, and we take care to have no luggage.” Lowe appears, sometimes as Emily and sometimes as Helen, in several essays and books on women and travelling in the 19th century, such as:

- Arcara, Stefania. "The Serpent and the Dove: Emily Lowe, an Unprotected Victorian Traveller in No Need of Protection." Journal of Gender Studies, Vol. 3, Issue 1 1994.
- McVicker, Mary F. 2008. Women Adventurers, 1750-1900. A Biographical Dictionary. McFarland & Co, Inc. Jefferson, North Carolina and London.
- Balducci, Temma & Heather Belnap Jensen. (Ed.) 2014. Women, Femininity and Public Space in European Visual Culture 1789-1914. Ashgate Publ. Ltd.: Farnham.
- Saunders, Clare Broome. (Ed.) 2014. Women, Travel Writing, and Truth. Routledge; Taylor & Francis Group.
- Mulen, Richard & James Munson. 2009. The Smell of the Continent: the British Discover Europe. Pan Books.
- McFadden, Margaret H. 1999. Golden Cables of Sympathy: the Transatlantic Sources of Nineteenth-Century Feminism. The University Press of Kentucky.
- Reilly, Catherine W. 2000. Mid-Victorian Poetry 1860-1879. Mansell.
- Walchester, Kathryn. 2014. Gamle Norge and Nineteenth-Century British Women Travellers in Norway. Anthem Press: London.
