= Emilia Dafni =

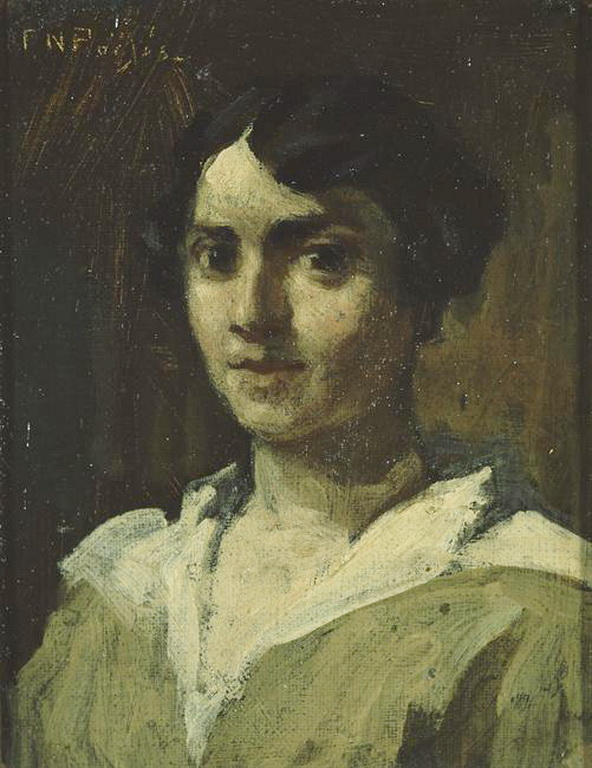
- Born: 1881
- Died: 1941 (aged 59–60)
- Writing career
- Genres: poetry, novel, play

Emilia Dafni (Greek: Αιμιλία Δάφνη) (1881 (Note: Her date of birth also appears as 1887 in some sources) – 1941) was a Greek writer.

The daughter of writer Ioannis Kourtelis and the goddaughter of Achilleus Paraschos, she married the poet Stefanos Thrasuboulos Zoiopoulos. She published a poetry collection Chrysanthemums in 1903. Besides poetry and novels, she also wrote several one-act plays and some short stories.

== Selected works ==
- Goblets of Gold, poetry (1923)
- The Gift of Smaro, novel (1924)
- Foreign Land, novel (1937)
