= Emilia Papadopoulos =

Journalist

- Born: 23 March 1987 (age 39); Limassol, Cyprus
- Presenting career
- Network: BBC
- Style: Television Reporter

Emilia Papadopoulos is a Greek-Cypriot and British BBC Television and Radio journalist.

== Early life ==
Papadopoulos grew up in Limassol, Cyprus. She studied at the University of Leeds and did a post graduate diploma in Journalism at Goldsmiths, University of London.

== Journalism career ==
Papadopoulos started her career at London Greek Radio as a newsreader and presenter. She worked at Radio Wimbledon during the 2008 Championships as a reporter. She joined the BBC in 2009, working on BBC London Sport, as a radio football and tennis reporter before joining BBC London TV as a producer and reporter She worked on the BBC's Football League show Late Kick Off from 2010 to 2012. During the London 2012 Olympic Games, she was a regular reporter for the Vanessa Feltz show on BBC London 94.9 and covered the Olympics and Paralympics. Papadopoulos also reports on BBC News (TV Channel), BBC News at One, BBC Radio 5 Live and BBC Radio 4. In 2015, she was commended by the judges of the CIRCOM awards in the Rising Star Journalist category for an investigation into young men using steroids. She has been reporting on The Queen & Royal Family's Christmas celebrations at Sandringham since 2015.

== Other activities ==
Papadopoulos supports two charities in Uganda where her father is from.

== Awards ==
2015: Circom Prix - Commended Rising Star Journalist Of The Year
