= Camila Jourdan =

Brazilian philosopher and activist

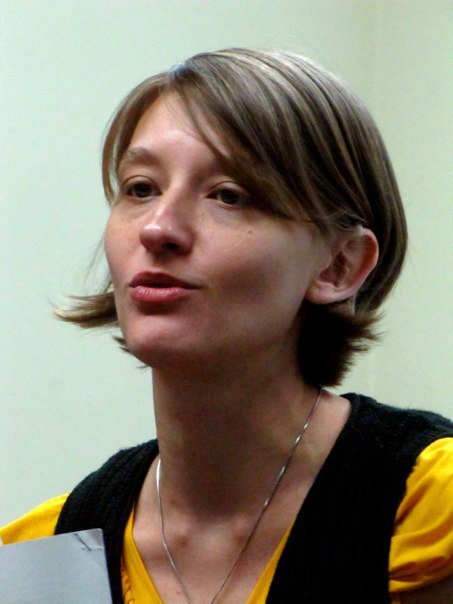
- Portrait of Jourdan, 2021
- Born: Camila Aparecida Rodrigues Jourdan; 1980 (age 45–46); Rio de Janeiro, Federative Republic of Brazil
- Partner: Igor D'Icarahy
- Children: 1

Academic background
- Education: Sorbonne University
- Alma mater: PUC-Rio
- Thesis: Impredicatividade, Generalidade e o Desenvolvimento do Pensamento de Wittgenstein (2009)
- Doctoral advisor: Christiane Chauviré

Academic work
- Discipline: Philosophy
- Institutions: UERJ
- Main interests: Ludwig Wittgenstein
- Movement: Anarchism
- Criminal charges: Conspiracy and corruption of minors
- Criminal penalty: 6 years imprisonment
- Criminal status: Acquitted
- Website: Publications by Camila Jourdan at ResearchGate

Camila Jourdan (born 1980) is a Brazilian philosopher, anarchist activist, and university professor. A specialist in the thought of Ludwig Wittgenstein and a teacher at Rio de Janeiro State University (UERJ), she is also known for being the target of a flawed prosecution by Brazilian authorities for her participation in the 2014 protests in Brazil, where she was accused by the country's security forces of preparing and making Molotov cocktails. Initially sentenced to six years in prison, she was ultimately fully acquitted in 2024 by the Supreme Federal Court.

== Biography ==
=== Youth and education ===
Camila Aparecida Rodrigues Jourdan was born in 1980 and is originally from the northern part of Rio de Janeiro. Her grandfather was a general in the Brazilian army. Fatherless at the age of 12, she had a daughter in 2001 or 2002. After studying philosophy at the Pontifical Catholic University of Rio de Janeiro and the Sorbonne in Paris, she defended her thesis on Ludwig Wittgenstein, her master thesis was called "How a rule connects with its applications: the problem of 'infinite determination' in the philosophy of the second Wittgenstein" and her doctoral thesis was called "Impredicativity, Generality and the Development of Wittgenstein's Thought".

She began teaching at the Rio de Janeiro State University as an assistant professor at first, and later as a full professor.

=== 2014 protests ===
In 2014, during the protests that shook Brazil in opposition to the hosting of the FIFA World Cup, in which she was actively involved, she was targeted by Brazilian security forces and portrayed as one of the leaders of the social movement. Her apartment, which she shared with her then-partner, Igor D'Icarahy, was searched by the police without a warrant. After finding fireworks and other items there, and finding messages referring to pencils, she was accused of planning to create Molotov cocktails and subsequently arrested. The indictment was weak and even included individuals such as Mikhail Bakunin, one of the founding thinkers of anarchism, who died in 1876. After being imprisoned for 12 days at Bangu prison during the protests, she was quickly released pending her trial. Facing these accusations, she received significant support from the Brazilian academic community, which mobilized to defend her and expressed concern about the implications for the political opinions of Brazilian scholars.

Initially sentenced to six years in prison, she was ultimately fully acquitted in 2024 by the Supreme Federal Court.
