= Emilia =

Emilia may refer to:

== People ==
- Emilia (given name), list of people with this name

== Places ==
- Emilia (region), a historical region of Italy. Reggio, Emilia
- Emilia-Romagna, an administrative region in Italy, including the historical regions of Emilia and Romagna
- Emilia, Łódź Voivodeship, a village in central Poland

== Arts ==
- Emilia (Bulgarian singer) (born 1982), full name Emiliya Valeva, known by the mononym Emilia
- Emilia Mernes, Argentine singer, known by the mononym Emilia
- Emilia Rydberg, Swedish singer, also performing as Emilia Mitiku and by the mononym Emilia
  - Emilia (album), 2000 self-titled album by Swedish singer Emilia Rydberg
- Emilia (Sítio do Picapau Amarelo), a fictional character of the Sítio do Picapau Amarelo series
- Emilia (Othello), a character in Shakespeare's Othello
- Emilia (TV series), a Venezuelan telenovela
- Emilia (play), a 2018 play by inspired by the life of the 17th century poet and feminist Emilia Bassano

== Others ==
- Emilia (plant), a genus of plants in the family Asteraceae
- Emilia (restaurant), in Mexico City
- Emilian–Romagnol, a linguistic continuum that is part of the Gallo-Italic languages spoken in the northern Italian region of Emilia-Romagna
- Hurricane Emilia, a number of hurricanes named Emilia
- 155 Infantry Division Emilia, an Italian infantry division of World War II
- MV Emilia, a ship launched in 1931

== See also ==
- Amelia (disambiguation)
- Aemilia (disambiguation)
- Emilian (disambiguation)
