= Emily Pangnerk Illuitok =

Inuk artist (born 1943)

- Born: 1943; Kurviguar Island, Kitikmeot, Nunavut
- Died: 2012 (aged 68–69); Kugaaruk, Kitikmeot, Nunavut

Emily Pangnerk Illuitok (1943–2012) was an Inuk artist.

Her work is included in the collections of the Musée national des beaux-arts du Québec and the Winnipeg Art Gallery.
