= Dafydd Emlyn =

Welsh poet and cleric

Dafydd Emlyn was a 17th-century Welsh poet and cleric. It is thought he may have been from the Teifi Valley. A number of his works are known to survive, some of which are written in his own hand.
