= Emīlija Veinberga =

Latvian politician (1896–1989)

Emīlija Veinberga (14 December 1896 – 5 September 1989) was a Latvian Communist politician. She served as the Minister of Justice of the Latvian SSR from 1951 to 1959. She was the first female Minister of Justice in Latvian history, as well as the first woman to be full cabinet minister rather than a deputy minister.

Emīlija Veinberga was born in Riga. She was trained as a nurse and worked in Moscow in Russia during the First World War. After the Russian Revolution, she became a party official of the Communist Party. Between 1925 and 1931, she was a party official in Turkmenistan. In 1928, she was appointed Judge for the Ashgabat. She thus became the first female judge in Turkmenistan. She was appointed Deputy Chairman for the High Court of the Latvian SSR in 1941, Deputy Commissioner of Justice in 1945–46, Deputy Minister of Justice in 1945–51, and Minister of Justice in 1951–59.
