= Emelie Melville =

American actress

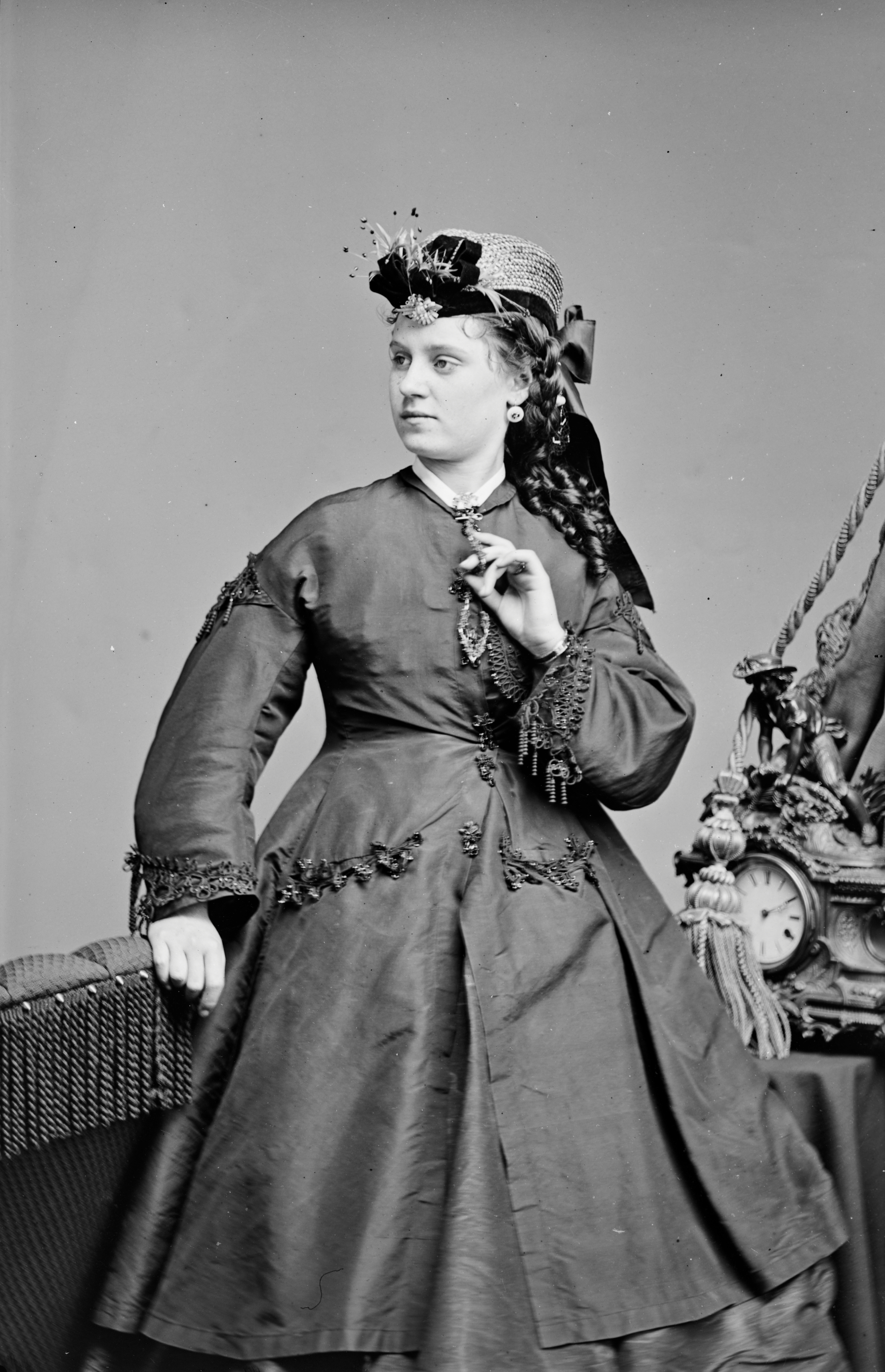
Emelie Melville

Emelie Melville (c. 1852 – 8 July 1932), also known as Emelie Melville Derby, was an American actress, a star of comic opera, who had a considerable career in Australia.

== History ==
She was born in Philadelphia and first appeared on stage at the age of 10 in several juvenile parts.

At age 16 she played Ophelia to John Wilkes Booth's Hamlet.

She was the first in America to play the title role in The Grand Duchess, in San Francisco. (Note: According to IBDB the Offenbach operetta's first American production was in New York (17 Jun 1868 – 18 July 1868)) Around this time she married Thomas Derby; they were divorced by 1884.

She first arrived in Australia in 1875 under engagement to W. S. Lyster to play in a series of operettas in Sydney, followed by Melbourne's Opera House, to packed houses.

She made a return tour of Australia in 1882. A dispute over her contract led to her suing the J. C. Williamson organisation in 1883. Costs involved led to her declaring insolvency in Melbourne. In September 1884 she left Melbourne for India, heading a large company of performers as the Emelie Melville Opera Company.

Around 1930 she had a small part in Margaret Anglin's revival of A Woman of No Importance, which was greatly appreciated by the audience.

Returning to San Francisco a few months before her death in 1932, she told an interviewer: "I've had a long life with much in it. I longed for glory and life and I got it. I saw the world and met royal people. Now I'm back in good old San Francisco—with my heart back to those old days."
