= Sant'Agostino, Prato =

Church building in Prato, Italy

Coordinates: 43.8844°N 11.0962°E

Chiesa di Sant'Agostino
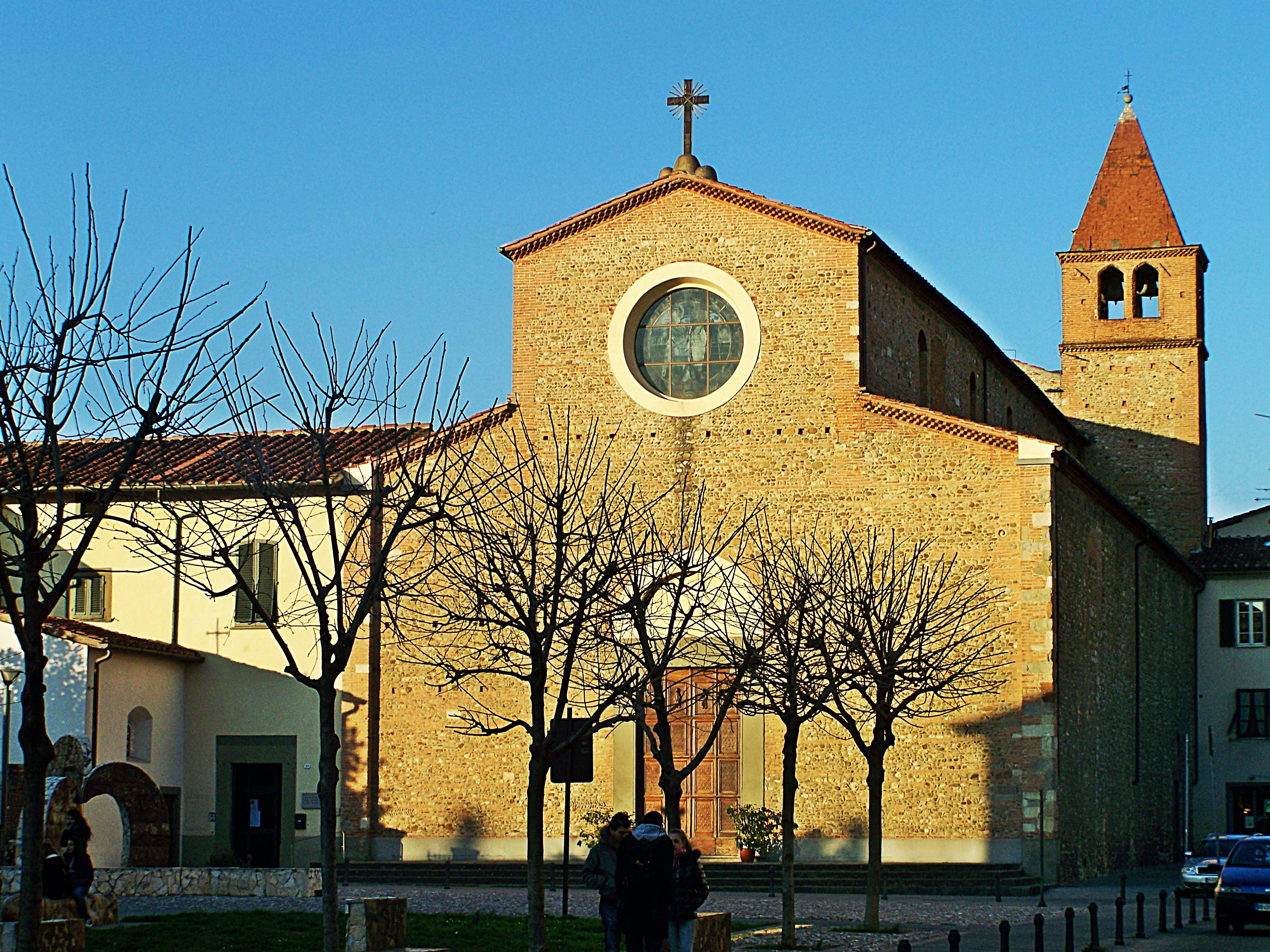
- Facade

Religion
- Affiliation: Roman Catholic

Location
- Location: Prato, Italy
- Interactive map of Chiesa di Sant'Agostino

Architecture
- Type: Church
- Style: Romanesque
- Groundbreaking: 1300 ca.
- Completed: 1700 ca.

Sant'Agostino
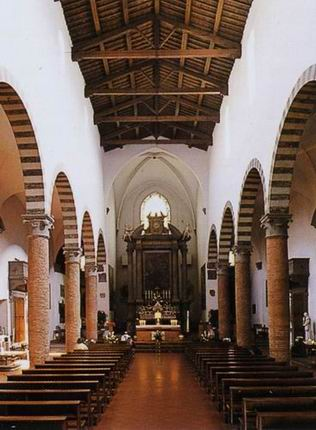

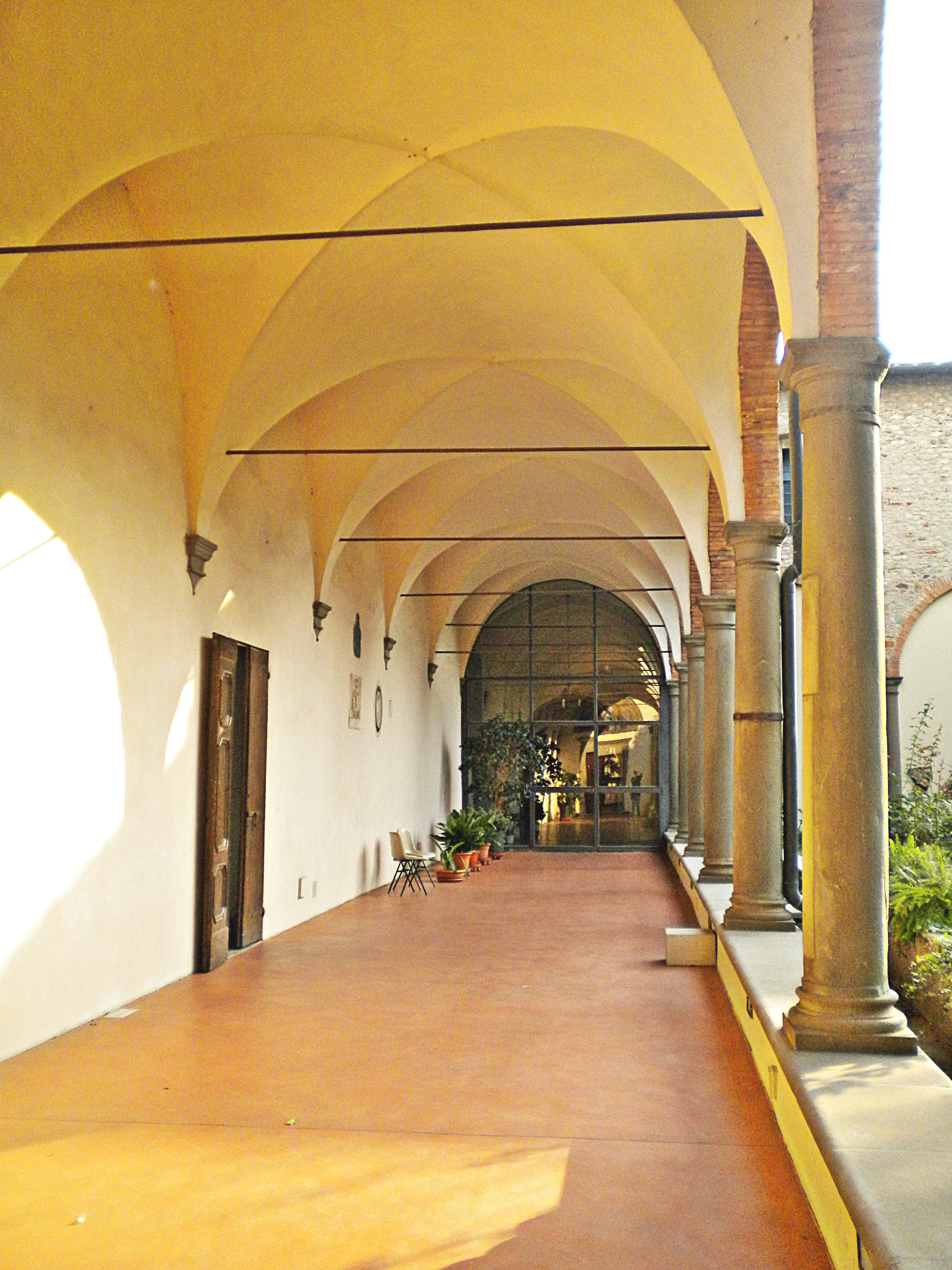

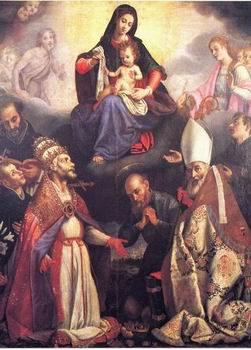
Altarpiece of Madonna della Cintola by Cigoli

Sant'Agostino is a Romanesque-style brick church in central Prato, Tuscany, Italy.

An oratory and small Augustinian monastery had been present on the site since 1271. Construction of the church lasted until 1440. New altars were built in the 16th and 17th century. It became a parish church upon the suppression of the convent in 1810. Since 1964, it has belonged to the Sacramentine order.
