= Emmy (given name) =

- Gender: Female (sometimes male)

Origin
- Meaning: short form of several names beginning in Em-

Other names
- Related names: Emma, Emily, Emmanuelle

Emmy is a feminine (sometimes also masculine) given name.

Orthographic variants include Emme, Emmi and Emmie. The name is in many instances a hypocoristic of either Emma (itself being in origin a hypocoristic of a number of ancient Germanic names beginning in Ermen-) or Emily, or Emmanuel (Emmanuelle). It came to be used as a separate (rare) German name, given officially in Germany from the later 19th century.

As an officially given feminine name, Emmy ranked 66th in Sweden and 89th in France as of 2010. Emmy is rarely also encountered as a surname.

Notable people with the name include:

- Emmy Ahlstedt (born 1981), Swedish politician
- Emmy Andriesse (1914–1953), Dutch photographer
- Emmie Charayron (born 1990), French triathlete
- Emmy Fecteau (born 1999), Canadian ice hockey player
- Emmy Krüger (1886-1976), German operatic soprano
- Emmy Loose (1914-1987), Austrian operatic soprano
- Emmie te Nijenhuis (born 1931), Dutch ethnomusicologist
- Emmy Noether (1882–1935), Bavarian Jewish mathematician
- Emmy Okello (born 1977), Ugandan consultant physician
- Emmie Owen (1871-1905), English opera singer and actress
- Emmy Stradal (1877–1925), Austrian politician
- Emmy Mercedes Todtmann (1888–1973), German glacial geologist
- Emmy Verhey (born 1949), Dutch violinist
- Emmy von Egidy (1872- 1946 in Weimar), German sculptor and writer.
- Emmy Wehlen (1887–1977), German actress
- Emmy Werner (1929–2017), American developmental psychologist

As a familiar form of Emma

- Emmy Bridgwater (1906–1999, born Emma Frith Bridgwater), English artist and poet
- Emmy Göring (1893-1973, born Emma Johanna Henny Sonnemann), German actress
- Emmy Hennings (1885–1948, born Emma Maria Cordsen), German performer and poet

As a familiar form of Emilie

- Emmy Destinn (1878–1930, born Emílie Pavlína Věnceslava Kittlová), Czech operatic soprano

As a familiar form of Emmanuel/Emmanuelle

- Emmy Bezzina (born 1945), male Maltese politician
- Emmy Rossum (born 1986 as Emmanuelle Grey Rossum), American actress

Fictional characters

- Emmy Altava, the character from the Professor Layton series
- Granny (Looney Tunes), the Looney Tunes character nicknamed Emmy in Hare Trimmed
- Emmy, the main character from the PBS animated preschool television series Dragon Tales

== See also ==
- Emi (disambiguation)
- Emy (disambiguation)
