= Emily Wick =

American chemist (1921-2013)

Emily Lippincott Wick
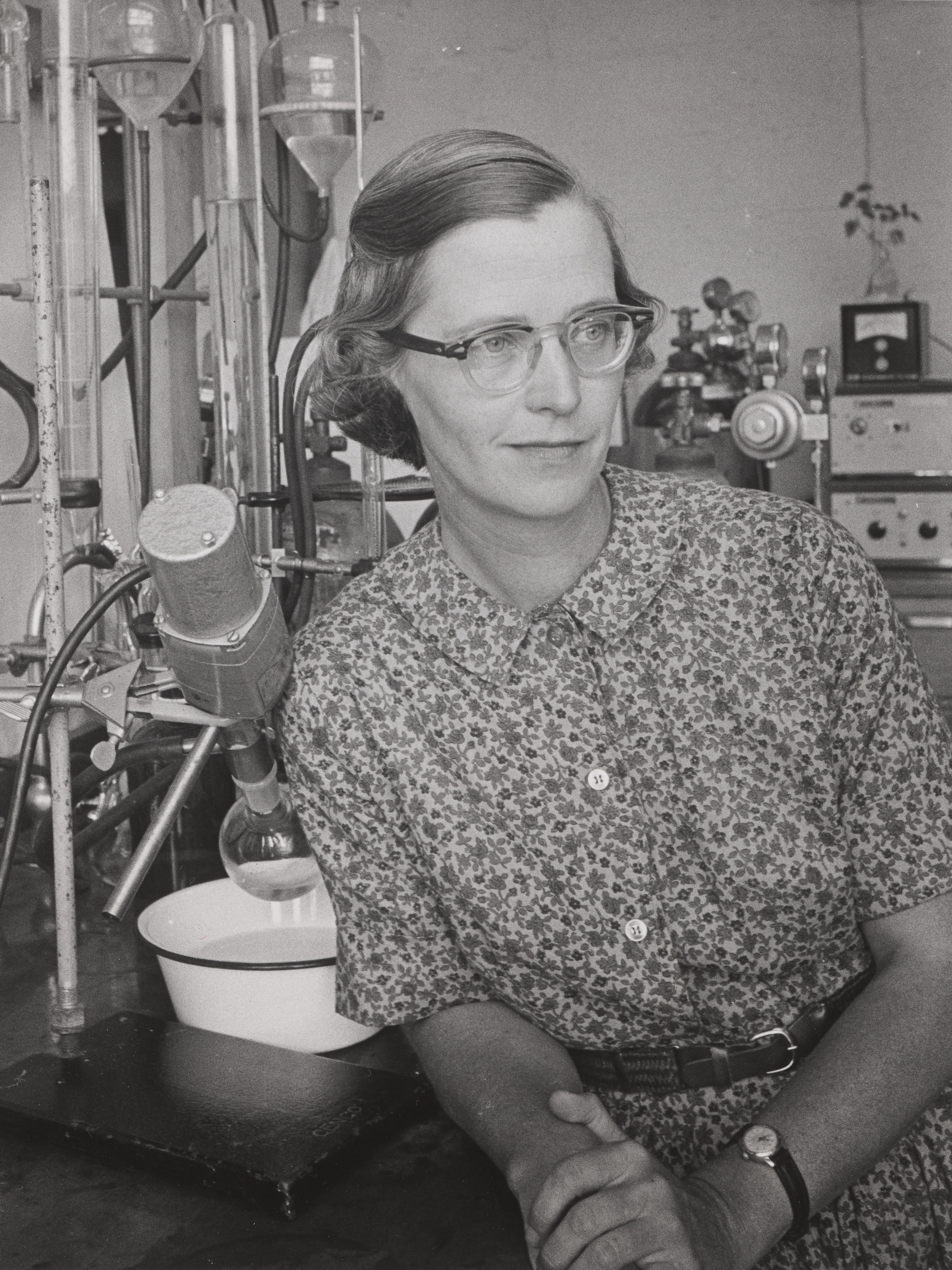
- Wick in 1965
- Born: December 9, 1921
- Died: March 21, 2013 (aged 91); Rockport, Massachusetts
- Education: BA and MA in chemistry from Mount Holyoke College; PhD in chemistry from Massachusetts Institute of Technology in 1951
- Scientific career
- Fields: Food technology
- Institutions: A.D. Little; Massachusetts Institute of Technology
- Thesis: Investigation of several hydrocarbons derived from carbonyl-bridged cyclic olefins; attempted synthesis of 1,2,3,4-dibenzcycloöctatetraene (1951)
- Doctoral advisor: Arthur C. Cope

Emily Lippincott Wick (December 9, 1921 – March 21, 2013) was the first woman to reach the rank of tenured faculty at the Massachusetts Institute of Technology (MIT). She taught in the Department of Nutrition and Food Science. Wick received her Ph.D. in chemistry from MIT in 1951 and became a tenured professor in 1963. She advocated on behalf of female students at MIT and was influential in getting coeducational residencies, so that with more living options more female applicants could be accepted.

Wick was also an avid sailor. She was the first woman commodore of the Sandy Bay Yacht Club in Rockport, Massachusetts, and the club's Race Committee boat was renamed the Emily Wick in 2012. At MIT she helped create the women's varsity sailing team, which was the first in the county to fund a coaching position dedicated to women sailors. In her honor, MIT alumnae organized the annual Emily Wick Regatta and the Emily L. Wick trophy which eventually became the Intercollegiate Women's Sailing Championship trophy.

== Education and Employment ==
Wick received her BS (chemistry) and MA (organic chemistry) from Mount Holyoke College and her PhD (chemistry) from the Massachusetts Institute of Technology. While working for A.D. Little, a management consulting firm in Boston, MA, she "discovered the chemistry for foods we take for granted such as Miracle Whip and Campbell's soups."

Wick joined the MIT faculty as assistant professor in the Department of Nutrition and Food Science in 1959 and "developed food systems for the newly formed astronaut corps." In 1963 she was the first woman faculty member to receive tenure at MIT, and she became associate dean of students in 1965. She served as a member of the MIT Corporation from 1978 to 1983, and was its first female member.

Wick became dean of faculty at Mount Holyoke College in 1973 and later served as special assistant to the president for long-range planning before retiring in 1986.
