= Emy Kat =

American photographer (born 1959)

- Born: Mohamed Alkhatib
- Occupations: Artist, photographer
- Website: emykat.com

Muhammed Alkhatib, known by his stage name Emy Kat, is a researcher, visual artist, and photographer.

== Career ==
Kat began his career in 1997, focusing on fashion photography, portraits, and commercial advertising.

In 2013, he began working in a technique in contemporary art that he refers to as a "digital collage" or "Mental Spaces." Kat participated in several local and international shows in 2014, including the 21,39 Jeddah Arts inaugural exhibition Moallaqat (2014), Art Dubai (2014), and Paris Photo (2014).

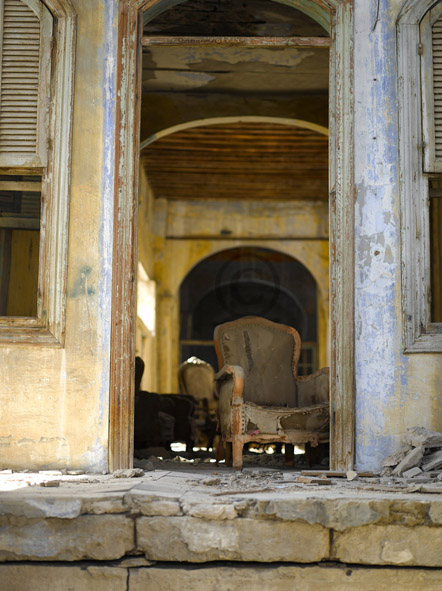
From the project "The Everlasting Now" (2012–2015) Philby No 1 – 2015 – Lambda Print – 90 × 67 cm – Ed of 6. A narrow view of the outside of a room of a dilapidated house, viewing an armchair within the room. Associated with Harry St John Bridger Philby – British Museum 2017

=== Other specialties ===
Kat's work primarily involves digital imaging. In 2008, he used an advanced LEAF digital camera back system. For most of his fine art, however, he uses photographic film with a large format view camera and medium format camera.

=== Notable artwork ===
- Nude studies of women on platinum (Etudes Nus femme); Archived and collected by the BNF Bibliothèque nationale de France (2000). Reference number Ep-4001-Boîte pet. fol. (Collection Publiques)
- Souls on the streets (Ames Dans les Rues) – (2009)
- Biennale des photographes du mond Arabe – Institute du Mond Arabe – Paris (2015)

=== Book contribution ===
Kat's photographs have been included in several books published by Graphis Inc.

- (1997) Annual Design ISBN 1-888001-24-0
- (1998) "Photography Annual" ISBN 1-888001-46-1
- (2000) "Nude 3" ISBN 1-888001-66-6
- (2006) "Photography Annual" ISBN 1-931241-46-5
- (2007) "Photography Annual" ISBN 1-932026-39-8
