= Berlin (Seedorf) =

- Village of Seedorf
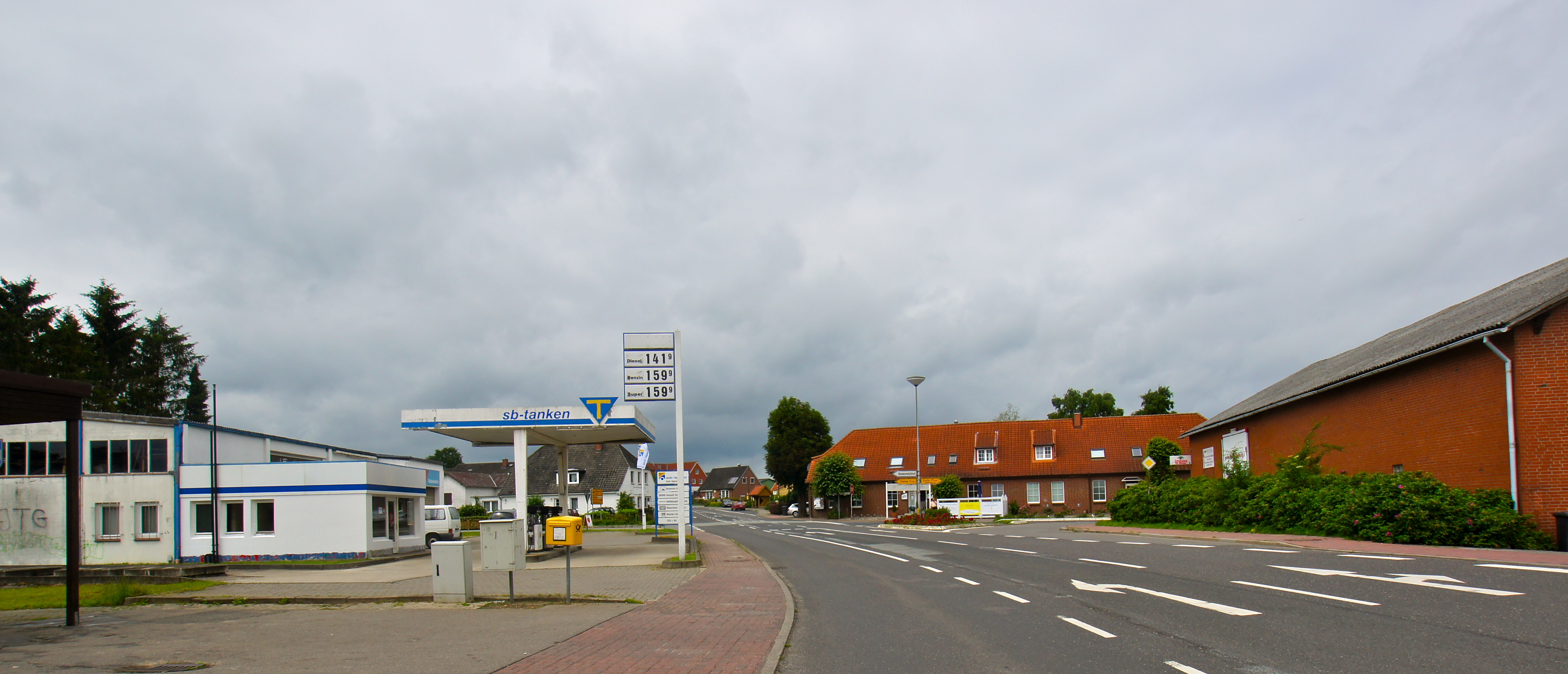
- Potsdamer Straße
- Interactive map of Berlin
- Location within Germany Location within Schleswig-Holstein
- Coordinates: 54°02′09.6″N 10°26′51.19″E
- Country: Germany
- State: Schleswig-Holstein
- District: Segeberg
- Town: Seedorf
- Elevation: 30 m (98 ft)

Population (2011)
  - Total: 520
- Time zone: UTC+01:00 (CET)
  - Summer (DST): UTC+02:00 (CEST)
- Postal codes: 23823
- Dialling codes: 04555, 04559
- Vehicle registration: SE
- Website: www.gemeinde-seedorf.de

Berlin is a German civil parish (Ortsteil) of the municipality of Seedorf, in the district of Segeberg, Schleswig-Holstein. With 520 inhabitants in 2011, it is the most populated settlement of the municipality.

== History ==
First mentioned in 1215, it is considered as the oldest "Berlin" in the world.

== Geography ==
Berlin is located in the natural park of the Holsteinische Schweiz, not too far from the Seekamp lake, and its principal roads link Eutin and Ahrensbök to Bornhöved. It is 5 km (3.1 mi) far from Seedorf, 26 km (16 mi) from Bad Segeberg, 33 km (21 mi) from Neumünster, 48 km (30 mi) from Kiel, 51 km (32 mi) from Lübeck, 86 km (53 mi) from Hamburg and 357 km (222 mi) from Berlin.

== Tourism ==
Due to its name, the Little Berlin is a receptive place for some tourists. Several references to the capital are located in the village, as for example the name of many streets and squares, as Potsdamer Platz, the central Potsdamer Straße, Kurfürstendamm, Unter den Linden, Wilmersdorfer Straße, Lichterfelde, Uhlandstraße and Heerstraße. In Potsdamer Platz is located a stone, placed on June 18, 1964, with an inscription representing the bear symbol of the capital and another recording "BERLIN 357 km berlin".

== Gallery ==
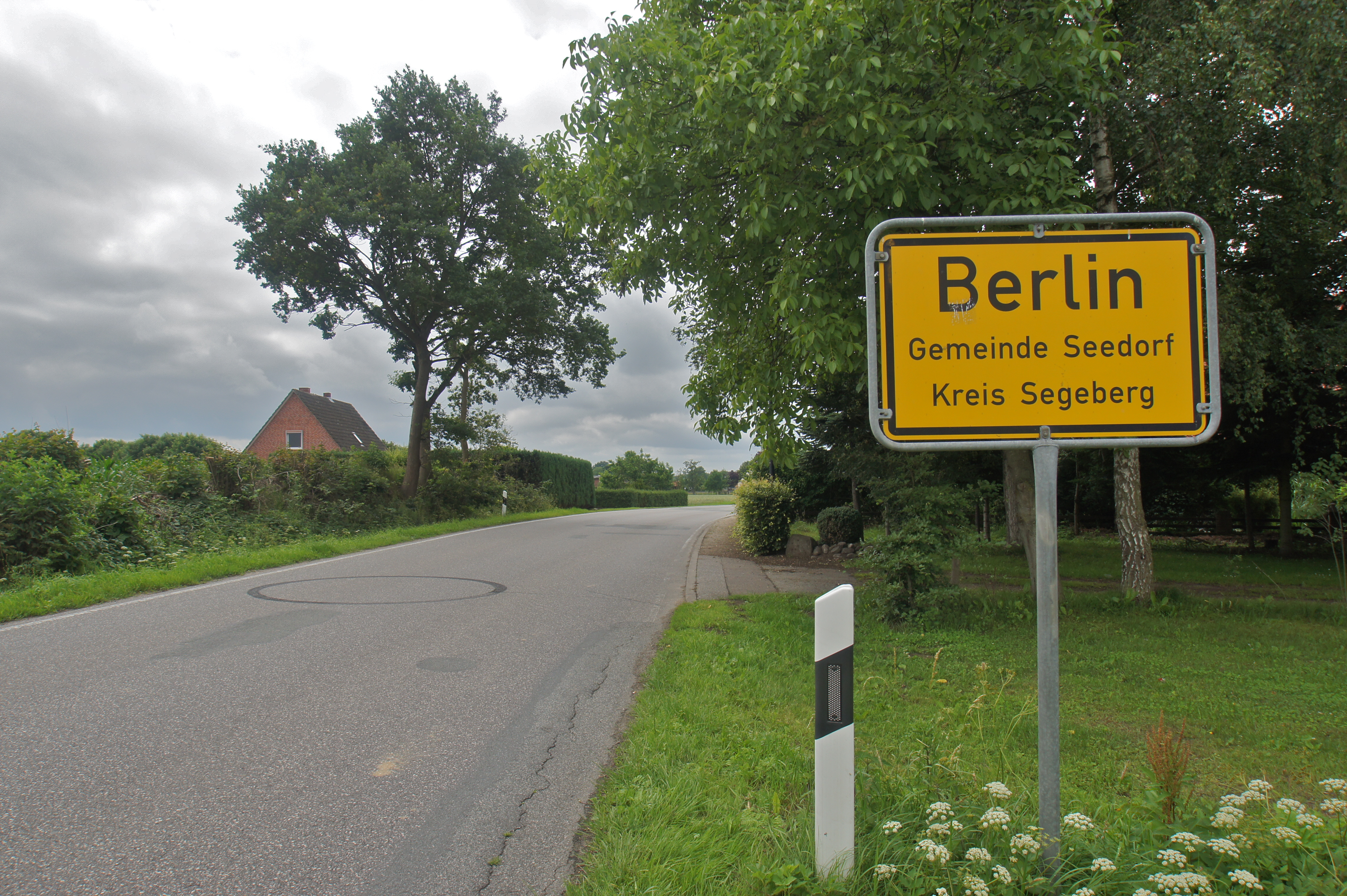
Village entrance

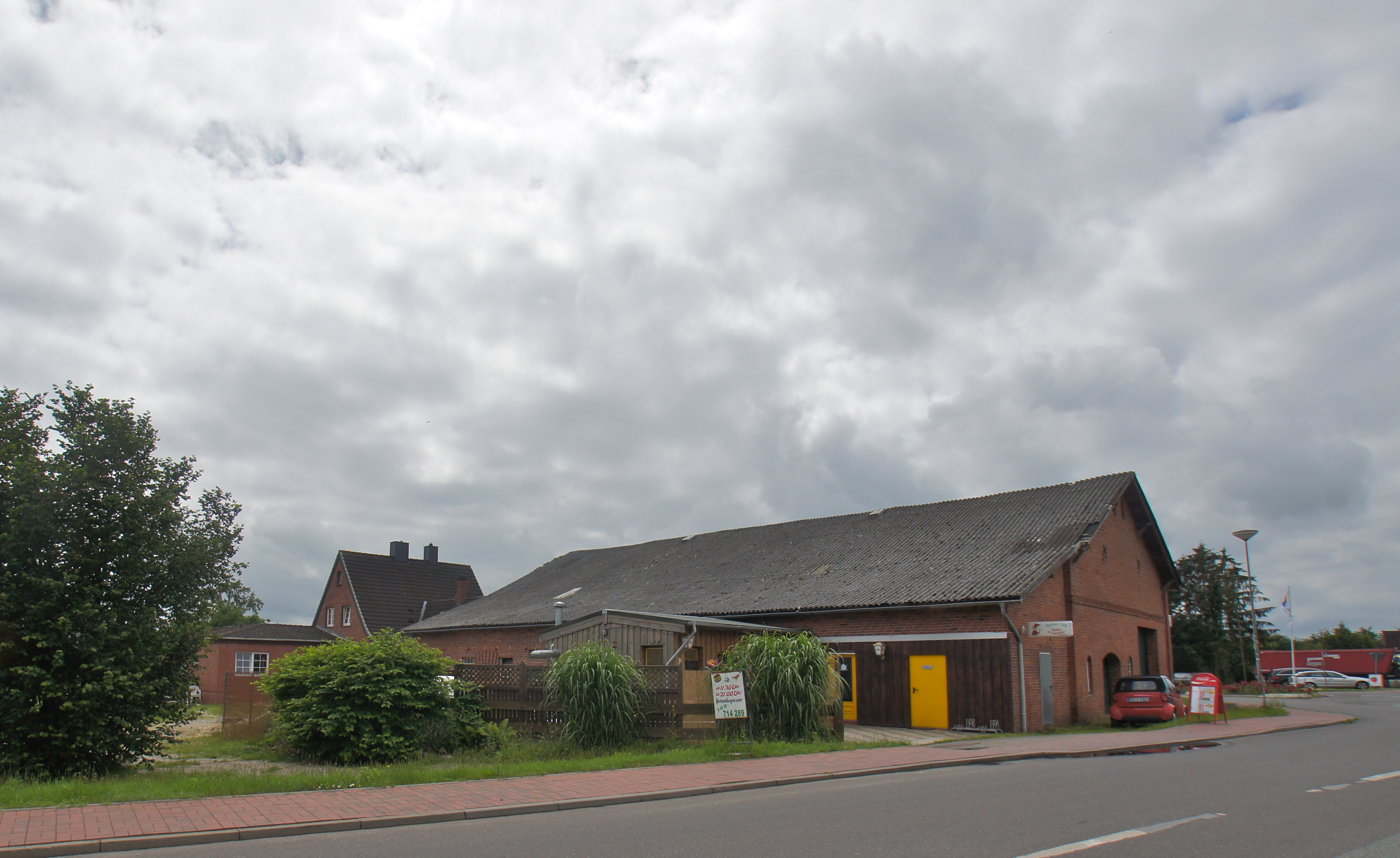
Pub Berliner Eck

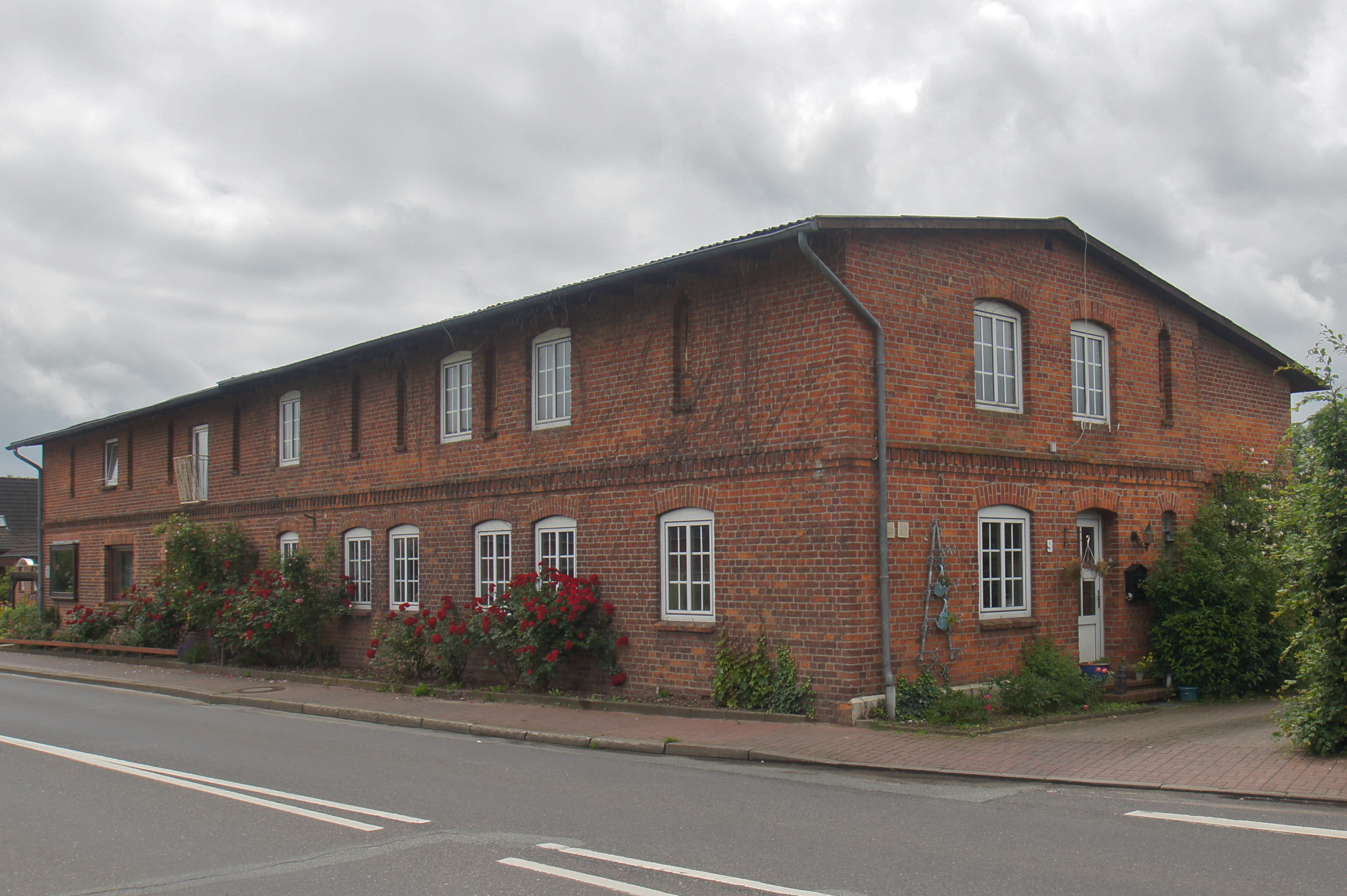
Fire station
