= Milly (dog) =

World's smallest dog (2011–2020)

Miracle Milly
- Breed: Chihuahua
- Sex: Female
- Born: December 2011
- Died: 2020
- Known for: Smallest dog living (height)
- Title: Smallest dog living (height)
- Predecessor: Boo Boo
- Owner: Vanesa Semler
- Residence: Dorado, Puerto Rico
- Weight: 1 lb (0.45 kg)
- Height: 0 ft (0 m)

Miracle Milly (December 2011 – 2020) was the world's smallest dog by height, according to the Guinness Book of World Records.

She was born in December 2011, and weighed approximately 1 pound (half a kilogram). On February 21, 2013, her height was measured, placing her at 9.65 cm (3.8 in). The previous smallest dog was Boo Boo, at 4 inches (10.16 centimeters) tall. Miracle Milly was owned by Vanesa Semler from Dorado, Puerto Rico.

The pet cloning company Sooam announced that they have produced 49 clones of Milly. The owners sued Sooam for breach of contract in 2019.

Milly died in 2020; the owners sued the vet for "substandard care" in July 2020.

Born to one of Milly's clones, Semler's chihuahua Pearl was named the world's shortest dog by the Guinness Book of World Records in 2023.
