= Emily S. Oakey =

American educator, author, poet, hymnist (1829–1883)

- Born: Emily Sullivan Oakey; October 8, 1829; Albany, New York, U.S.
- Died: May 11, 1883 (aged 53); Albany
- Education: Albany Female Academy
- Occupations: educator; author; poet

Emily S. Oakey (sometimes incorrectly spelled, "Oakley"; October 8, 1829 – May 11, 1883) was an American educator, author, and poet from New York. She published Dialogues and Conversations (1879) and At the Foot of Parnassus (1883), the latter of which included many poems that had first appeared in prominent periodicals such as The Century Magazine and The Springfield Republican. Writing the lyrics to the hymn “What Shall the Harvest Be?” in 1850, Oakey contributed poems to both literary and religious publications during her career. She spent nearly three decades teaching languages and literature at the Albany Female Academy.

== Early life and education ==
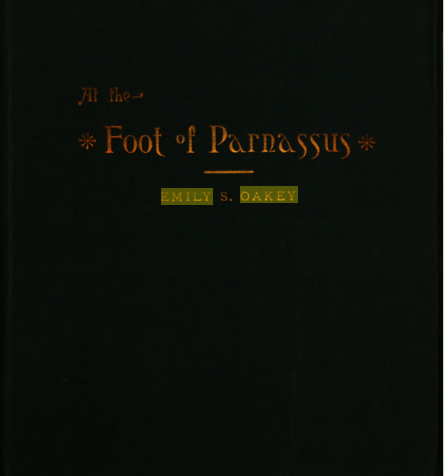
At the Foot of Parnassus, 1883

Emily Sullivan Oakey was born October 8, 1829, in Albany, New York. She graduated from the Albany Female Academy in 1850.

== Career ==
She was the author of Dialogues and Conversations, as well as At the Foot of Parnassus, a collection of poems. Of the latter, several of the poems in this book were reprinted, by permission, from various periodical publications in which they first appeared, including The Century Magazine, Outing, Albany Evening Journal, the Independent, the Christian Union, the Illustrated Christian Weekly, the Springfield Republican, The Criterion, Our Work at Home, and The Freeport Journal Standard.

In 1850, she wrote the lyrics to "What Shall the Harvest Be?", but was not generally known until Ira D. Sankey included it among his solos, the music being composed especially for it by Philip Bliss. It was her only contribution to the cause of evangelism.

Beginning in 1854 and until her death in 1883, she taught English literature, logic, Latin, German, and French at the Albany Female Academy.

== Death ==
Emily Oakey died in Albany, on May 11, 1883.

== Selected works ==
- Dialogues and Conversations, designed for the use of schools (New York City/Chicago/New Orleans: A. S. Barnes, 1879)
- At the Foot of Parnassus (Albany, New York: D. R. Niver Publishing Company, 1883)
