= Emilie Lennert =

Karen Agathe Emilie Marie Lennert (née Olsen; 5 November 1931 – 3 May 2019) was a Greenlandic politician for the Atassut party. She was elected to the Sisimiut Municipal Council from 1967 and remained on the council until 2001. Lennert was a co-founder of the Greenlandic Association of Municipalities (KANUKOKA) in 1972. She was elected to the Inatsisartut, Greenland's parliament, in 1984 and remained a member until 1995. Lennert was a recipient of the Nersornaat in silver from the Naalakkersuisut.

== Early life ==
Lennert was born in Sisimiut on 5 November 1931. She was the daughter of the blacksmith foreman Frederik Olsen and Dorthea Lennert. She was educated at Greenland's only girls' secondary school in Aasiaat (then called Egedesminde) from 1946 to 1948, during an era when it was uncommon for Greenlandic girls to receive an education. Lennert took her secondary school leaving examination in Nuuk (then known as Godthåb) in 1950.

== Career ==
In 1950, she began her career at the Landsfogedkontoret in Nuuk, enrolling on an office training course. Lennert later studied at the Niels Brock Copenhagen Business College in Denmark, passing the state-controlled business examination in 1952. She was employed as a typist by the Sisimiut tax office and later as an interpreter at Sisimiut municipal council meetings for times during the 1950s. In 1967, Lennert accepted the local women's association's invitation to run for the municipal council election. She became one of the first women to gain election to a municipal council and remained on it until 2001. Lennert was a member of the Board of Directors of Knud Rasmussen's High School in Sisimiut from 1967 to 1993, serving as Chairman of the Board of Directors between 1979 and 1993.

She was a co-founder of the Greenlandic Association of Municipalities (KANUKOKA) in 1972, and was a member of the board until 1979. Lennert became mayor and chairman of the Sisimiut Municipality in 1975, remaining in the job for 12 years. She was a participant in the Committee on the Separation of Resources and Tasks that led to the transfer of responsibility for the management of municipalities to the municipal councils from the state from 1 January 1976. She was a judge at the Circuit Court in Sisimiut between 1979 and 1983. Lennert was a member of the Parliamentary Committee on the Reorganization of Social Security from 1980 until the project ended.

She was elected to the Inatsisartut, Greenland's parliament, as a member of the moderate party Atassut and served there from 1984 to 1995. Lennert was a member of multiple committees, which included the Social Affairs, Culture and Education, the Committee on Civil Servants, the Advisory Board on Gender Equality and the Committee on Relations with the Parliament and the Folketing between 1987 and 1995.

== Personal life ==
Lennert married the machinist Knud Lennert on 25 January 1959. There were four children of the marriage. She died on 3 May 2019.

== Recognition ==
In 1997, Lennert received the Nersornaat in silver from the Naalakkersuisut. She was appointed an honorary citizen of Sisimiut in 2002. Lennert was honoured by KANUKOKA in 2017.
