= Emelia Coloma =

Ecuadorian footballer (born 1988)

Personal information
- Full name: Emelia Isabel Coloma Pardo
- Date of birth: 18 October 1988 (age 38)
- Place of birth: Guayaquil, Ecuador
- Position: Midfielder

International career^{‡}
Years	Team	Apps	(Gls)
2006	Ecuador	4	(0)
- ‡ National team caps and goals as of 10 November 2006

Emelia Isabel Coloma Pardo (born 18 October 1988) is an Ecuadorian former footballer who played as a midfielder. She has been a member of the Ecuador women's national team.

== International career ==
Coloma capped for Ecuador at senior level during the 2006 South American Women's Football Championship.
