= St. Emlyn's =

Fictional hospital in England

- St. Emlyn's virtual hospital

Geography
- Location: World Wide Web, Manchester, England, United Kingdom

Organisation
- Care system: Education
- Type: Emergency Medicine
- Affiliated university: Manchester Metropolitan University

Services
- Emergency department: Adult and Paediatric services on site
- Beds: infinite

History
- Founded: 2003

Links
- Website: https://www.stemlyns.org.uk
- Lists: Hospitals in England

St. Emlyn’s is a virtual hospital developed by educationalists based at the Manchester Royal Infirmary, England. It incorporates online learning materials, a blog, and a podcast.

== Development ==
In 2012 a blog was added to the St. Emlyn's group of websites.

The St. Emlyn’s blog was developed in June 2012 at the International Conference of Emergency Medicine (ICEM) in Dublin. It is an open access platform that promotes emergency medicine learning through the use of social media. It its to provide education through the use of blogs and associated podcasts (see below) It disseminates content through associated Twitter, Facebook and Instagram accounts.

The blog focuses on the emergency and critical care in healthcare. It has four main topic themes:

- Evidence Based Medicine
- Clinical Excellence
- Philosophy of Emergency Medicine
- Wellbeing

=== Influence and impact ===
From June 2012-Jan 2017 the blog has published 510 articles, approved and published 2,776 comments and has had pages viewed over 1.25 million times, according to its creators. In 2019, the St. Emlyn's blog is listed as the 15th most influential emergency medicine/critical care blogs according to the Social Media Index scoring system.

== St. Emlyn's podcast ==
The St. Emlyn's podcast was founded in 2013. It follows the same four main topic themes of the St. Emlyn's blog and is produced by the same editorial team.

== St. Emlyn's virtual learning environment ==
Initially the site grew through the acquisition of increasing numbers of clinical cases. In 2006 the site was further developed to incorporate a virtual learning environment based on the open source course management system Moodle. The VLE has allowed the original assorted cases to be themed into areas that reflect the College of Emergency Medicine curriculum. This is a unique approach to the delivery of a postgraduate medical education curriculum.

Further courses have been developed for trainees across all grades in emergency medicine. In addition St. Emlyn's acts as a hub for a number of evidence based journal clubs.

=== Case types ===
Cases are divided into the following types.

- Straightforward clinical cases comprising a clinical narrative, supported by images, results of investigations, correspondence and (in a few cases) sound files. These are used either as PBL cases or as cases to generate case-based discussions.
- Evidence based cases comprising a case short narrative leading to the evidence based repository at bestbets.org. The waiting room of St. Emlyn’s Emergency Department is full of cases with a short history ending in a question — the answer of which (obviously!) lies in the linked BestBET.
- Cases of the Week (or COWs) — cases based upon the daily Board Rounds at Manchester Royal Infirmary that have a significant educational message

=== Organisation of cases in St. Emlyn's ===
The six core clinical modules are

- AcuteMedicine 1,
- Trauma,
- Paediatrics,
- Surgery,
- Acute Medicine 2
- Psychosocial

The three management modules are

- Emergency Medicine and the Law
- HR Management in the Emergency Department
- Managing the Emergency Department

The academic modules are

- Study design and execution
- Evidence based Emergency Medicine

== Publications relating to St. Emlyn's ==
The design and evolution of St. Emlyn's has been described in the medical literature.

- Mackway-Jones, K.; Carley, S.; Kilroy, D. (2007). "Advanced training in emergency medicine: A pedagogical journey from didactic teachers to virtual problems". Emergency Medicine Journal. 24 (10): 696–698. doi:10.1136/emj.2006.043885. PMC 2658434. PMID 17901268.
- Carley, S.; Mackway-Jones, K. (2007). "Developing a virtual learning course in emergency medicine for F2 doctors". Emergency Medicine Journal. 24 (8): 525–528. doi:10.1136/emj.2006.042937. PMC 2660066. PMID 17652668.
- Spedding, R.; Jenner, R.; Potier, K.; Mackway-Jones, K.; Carley, S. (2013). "Blended learning in paediatric emergency medicine: Preliminary analysis of a virtual learning environment". European Journal of Emergency Medicine. 20 (2): 98–102. doi:10.1097/MEJ.0b013e3283514cdf. PMID 22415016.
- Carley, Simon; Beardsell, Iain; May, Natalie; Crowe, Liz; Baombe, Janos; Grayson, Alan; Carden, Richard; Liebig, Ashley; Gray, Chris; Fisher, Ross; Horner, Daniel; Howard, Laura; Body, Richard (2018). "Social-media-enabled learning in emergency medicine: a case study of the growth, engagement and impact of a free open access medical education blog". Postgraduate Medical Journal. 94 (1108): 92–96. doi:10.1136/postgradmedj-2017-135104. PMID 29054933.

== See also ==
- Manchester Royal Infirmary
- Manchester Metropolitan University
- BestBETs
