= Emilie Tegtmeyer =

German writer, historian (1827–1903)

Leopoldine Emilie Ernestine Tegtmeyer (5 January 1827 – 16 February 1903) was a German writer and historian. Her first written works were novels and she later moved into nonfiction biographies.

== Biography ==
Tegtmeyer was born on 5 January 1827 in Hornsmühlen (now Seedorf), Holstein, the child of the paper manufacturer Jost Georg Tegtmeyer and his wife Ernestine Catharina Leopoldine Tegtmeyer, née Spethmann. The paper mill had existed in Hornsmühlen since 1685 and remained in operation until 1865. Emilie was taught privately in her parents' home and, after her confirmation, was sent to live with her brother-in-law, Pastor Friedrich Daniel Binge in Kellinghusen, for several more years of education. For six years she served as a governess for three families.

Afterwards she lived in Bremen with her aunt Anna Margaretha Iken née Tegtmeyer (1794 – 1862), who was married to Hermann Heinrich Arnold Iken (1792 – 1872), collector of direct taxes in the city of Bremen, since 28 April 1821. Anna Margaretha was a sister of Emilie's father Jost Georg Tegtmeyer.

After her aunt Margaretha died, Emilie kept her widowed uncle's house running smoothly until 1872 when he also died. She and her friend Julie Rodowe, who was also a teacher, moved into a shared apartment in Bremen, in 1873. In 1902, she was described in the Bremen address book as a writer, although previously she had given her profession as teacher.

She died 16 February 1903 in Bremen.

== Writings ==
Tegtmeyer began by writing historical novels. Twice (in 1862 and 1868) she published works about imperial brothers, but she was describing two different pairs of brothers. In her first four-volume work, she wrote about King Frederick the Fair (c. 1286–1330) and his cousin, Emperor Louis the Bavarian (1287–1347). The novel takes place between 1314 and 1330. In it, Frederick and Louis fight for possession of the imperial crown. Their Battle of Mühldorf (1322) brings a decisive outcome. Eventually, they rule the empire together as "imperial brothers."

Later she wrote a similar work, The Emperor Brothers: Fiction and Truth from Modern History (1868), which was about the Austrian Emperor Franz Joseph I and his brother Maximilian I of Mexico (died 1867).

Her knowledge of the Austrian imperial family benefited her once again in 1891, when she created the work titled Memories from the Life of Johann Georg Lohmann on behalf of his wife. To write it, she used parts of Maximilian I's travelogue, in which he reports on a visit to Bahia, Brazil, with the Austrian consul Lohmann.

Her work The Mayor's Daughter relied on research by the lawyer Dr. A. Kühtmann about the mayor of Bremen, Statius Speckhan, which was published in the twelfth volume of the Bremen Yearbook.

The work "The Blood Seed" deals with the murder of the Bremen reformer Heinrich von Zütphen. For that book, she used information from the reformer's biography written in 1886 by Pastor J. Fr. Iken.

Of Tegtmeyer's smaller writings, the volume containing the stories The Boatman of Sylt and A Pearl on the Way is considered remarkable for its portrayal of the inhabitants of Sylt.

In the poem The Night Ride, she describes the rescue of the Danish King Valdemar II, who was soundly defeated at the Battle of Bornhöved in 1227 by Count Adolf of Holstein with the help of the Archbishop of Bremen and the Ditmarschen. According to legend, the Holy Virgin assisted the Count in battle by holding her veil over the sun, so the Holsteiners would fight in the shadows while the sunlight blinded the Danes. The poem is based on the same legend and describes the rescue of the wounded king by his noble enemy, Count Adolf of Holstein. In a night ride, the Count brought the wounded king to the city of Kiel, Germany.

== Selected works ==
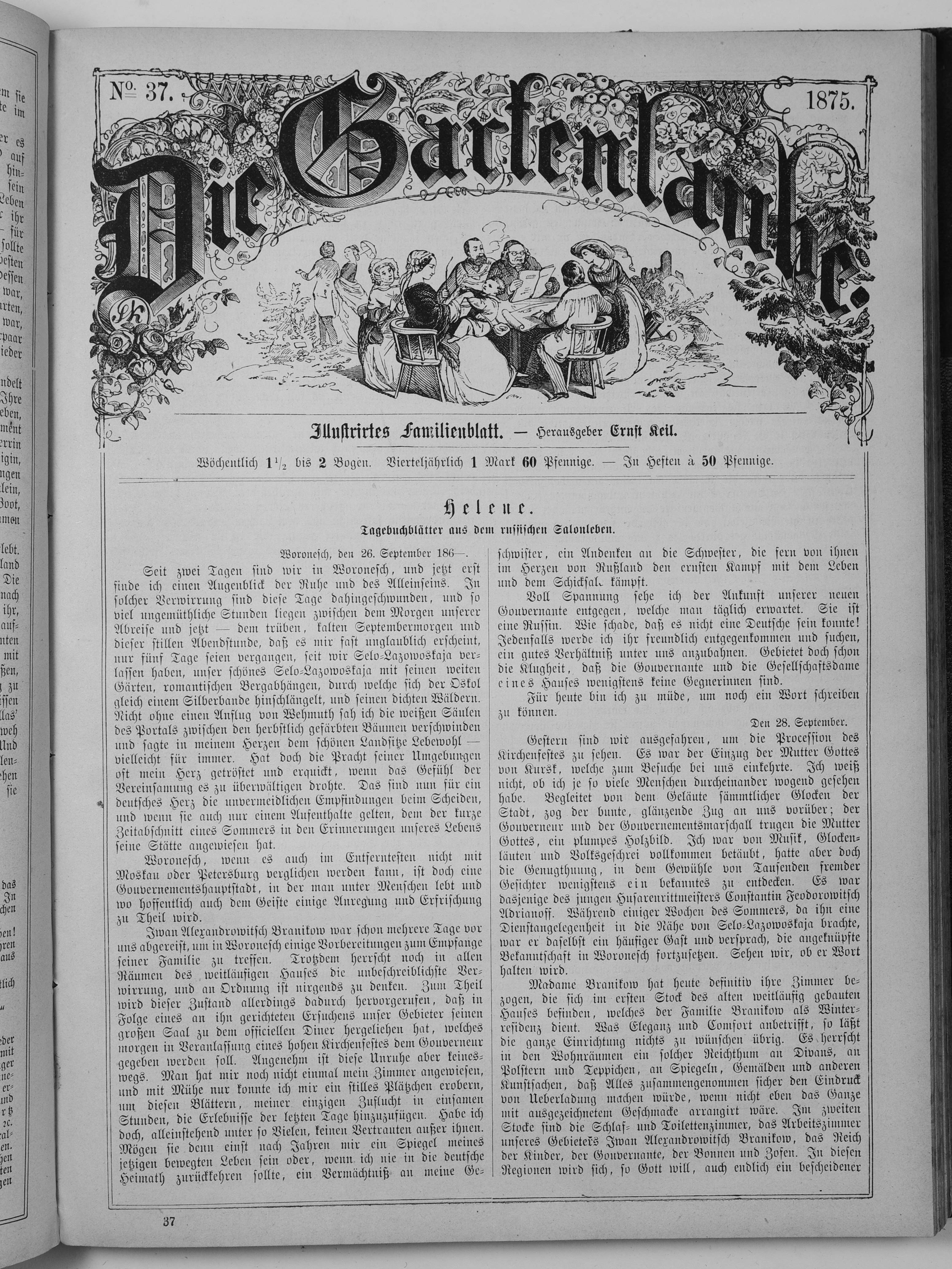
First page of Helene (1875)

- The Emperor's Brothers. Historical Novel. (4 volumes) Aschenfeldt, Lübeck 1862.
- The Imperial Brothers. Fiction and Truth from Recent History. Part Three: Part I / Emperor Maximilian I or The Victim of Treason, Part II / Emperor Franz Joseph I. Fr. Karafiat, Brno 1868.
- Helene. Diary pages from Russian salon life . Serial edition: Die Gartenlaube, 1875; book edition: Kröner, Stuttgart, 1881–1882.
- The Boatman of Sylt. A Pearl on the Way. Two Stories. Hoernum-Bild Schwarz, Hörnumn (Sylt) 1880. Carl Schünemann Verlag, 1887.
- The Mayor's Daughter. A Tale from Bremen's Past. Schünemann, Bremen 1885.
- The Seed of Blood. A Tale from the Reformation Period. Costenoble, Jena 1890.
- Memories from the life of Johann Georg Lohmann. Printed as a manuscript and written on behalf of his wife with the assistance of the Bremen writer Emilie Tegtmeyer, Bremen 1891.
- Struggles of Life. Narrative. Publisher of the Christian Journal Association, Berlin 1897.
- The Night Ride, poem
