= Emilia Gierczak =

Polish Armed Forces soldier (1925–1945)

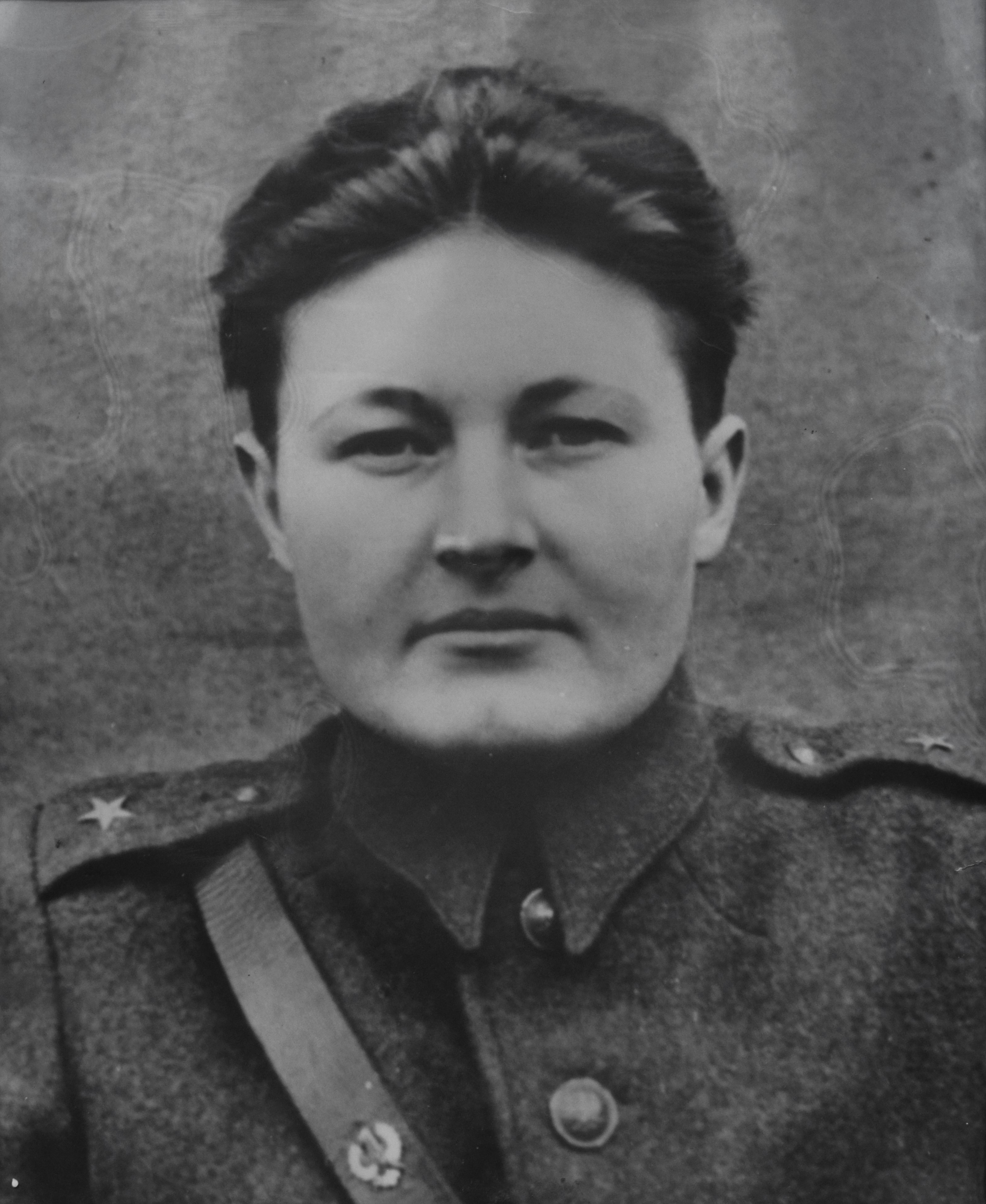
- Born: February 25, 1925; Mashiv, Volhynian Voivodeship
- Died: March 17, 1945 (aged 20); Kołobrzeg, West Pomeranian Voivodeship
- Military career
- Allegiance: Polish Armed Forces in the East
- Service years: 1943–1945
- Rank: Podporucznik (Second lieutenant); Porucznik (First lieutenant)- posthumously
- Unit: Polish 1st Tadeusz Kościuszko Infantry Division
- Second World War: Battle of Kolberg
- Awards

Emilia Gierczak (February 25, 1925 – March 17, 1945) was a Polish soldier of the Polish Armed Forces in the East during the Second World War. After being killed in combat, several streets and organisations were subsequently named after her in Poland.

== Career ==
Emilia Gierczak was born in 1920 to Jozef and Leontyna Gierczak. They named her after national heroine Emilia Plater. After the start of the Second World War, and the invasion of the eastern states of Poland by the Soviet Union, Gierczak and her family were deported to Arkhangelsk, where she began working in a bakery. Both Gierczak and her father were inducted into the army.

Gierzak trained at the Infantry Officers School in Ryazan, Russia. She was then posted as a second lieutenant to the Emilia Plater Independent Women's Battalion attached to the Polish 1st Tadeusz Kościuszko Infantry Division in 1943.

While fighting at Kołobrzeg, West Pomeranian Voivodeship, on March 17, 1945, Gierczak was ordered to take a defended building. Rather than waiting till nightfall, she decided to take it during the day so no one would think of her as weak. She issued orders to her troops, but they were pinned down. While moving up to the front to encourage her soldiers, she was shot in the forehead and died instantly. Upon the death of their commanding officer, the troops sought to avenge her, and took the building.

== Legacy ==
She was awarded the Cross of Valour. Several roads in Poland have been named after Gierczak, as well as schools and other organisations. The last letter Gierczak wrote to her mother is on display at the Museum of Polish Arms in Kołobrzeg. In 1997 Minister of National Defence promoted her posthumously to the rank of lieutenant.

== Awards and decorations ==
- Silver Cross of Virtuti Militari (posthumously, 9 April 1945)
- Cross of Valour (posthumously)
