= List of restaurants in Rhode Island =

This is an incomplete list of notable restaurants in Rhode Island.

== Current ==
- Al Forno
- Angelo's Civita Farnese
- Aunt Carrie's
- Bess Eaton
- Camille’s (Providence, Rhode Island)
- The Capital Grille
- Central Diner
- Chelo's Hometown Bar & Grille
- Clarke Cooke House
- Del's
- Gregg's Restaurants & Taverns
- Haven Brothers Diner
- Modern Diner
- Newport Creamery
- The Nordic
- Olneyville New York System
- Poirier's Diner
- White Horse Tavern (Newport, Rhode Island)

== Defunct ==
- Bugaboo Creek Steakhouse
- Old Canteen
- Scialo Bros. Bakery
