= Camille (given name) =

- Pronunciation: /kəˈmɪl/ French: [kaˈmij]
- Gender: Unisex (female, male)

Origin
- Origin: "acolyte" (young cult officiant); a Latin cognomen

Camille is a Latin-French unisex name.

== History ==
The form Camille was later associated with the heroine of Dumas' The Lady of the Camellias (1848), which served as the basis for Verdi's opera La Traviata and several films. In Dumas' novel, Camille is not the given name of the heroine; this name was applied to her in derived works in the English-speaking world, presumably because of the similarity in sound to the floral name Camellia (which was coined by Linnaeus (1753) after the name of the Czech Jesuit missionary Georg Joseph Kamel).

The name Camille was given to the heroine as early as in a silent film of 1915, but it became widely known (and led to the increased popularity of the given name in the United States) with Greta Garbo's Camille of 1936.

== Male ==
- Camille Arambourg (1885–1969), French paleontologist
- Camille Bob (1937–2015), American rhythm and blues singer and musician
- Camille Bombois (1883–1970), French painter
- Camille Bulcke (1909–1982), Belgian Jesuit missionary
- Camille Chamoun (1900–1987), former president of Lebanon
- Camille Chat (born 1995), French rugby union player
- Camille Combal (born 1981), French television presenter
- Camille Cordahi (1919–2011), Lebanese footballer
- Camille Chevillard (1859–1923), French composer and conductor
- Camille Corot (1796–1875), French painter
- Camille Danguillaume (1919–1950), French cyclist
- Camille Decoppet (1862–1925), Swiss politician
- Camille Delamarre (born 1979), French film editor and film director
- Camille Desmoulins (1760–1794), French journalist and revolutionary
- Camille Doucet (1812–1895), French poet and playwright
- Camille Dreyfus (chemist) (1878–1956), Swiss chemist
- Camille Ferdinand Dreyfus (1849–1915), French politician
- Camille du Locle (1832–1903), French opera librettist
- Camille Erlanger (1863–1919), French opera composer
- Camille Everardi (1824–1899), Belgian opera singer
- Camille Flammarion (1842–1925), French astronomer and author
- Camille Flers (1802–1868), French painter
- Camille Gira (1958–2018), Luxembourgish politician
- Camille Graeser (1892–1980), Swiss painter
- Camille Guérin (1872–1961), French scientist
- Camille Gutt (1884–1971), Belgian economist, politician, and industrialist
- Camille Henry (1933–1997), Canadian ice hockey player
- Camille Hilaire (1916–2004), French painter
- Camille Huard (born 1951), French-Canadian boxer
- Camille Huysmans (1871–1968), Belgian politician
- Camille Jenatzy (1868–1913), Belgian racing driver
- Camille Jordan (1838–1922), French mathematician
- Camille Jordan (politician) (1771–1821), French politician
- Camille Jullian (1859–1933), French historian
- Camille Lacourt (born 1985), French swimmer
- Camille Laurin (1922–1999), Canadian psychiatrist and politician
- Camille le Tellier de Louvois (1675–1718), French clergyman
- Camille Lefèvre (1853–1933), French sculptor
- Camille Lemonnier (1844–1913), Belgian writer
- Camille Libar (1917–1991), Luxembourgish footballer
- Camille Lopez (born 1989), French rugby union player
- Camille Malfroy (1839–1897), New Zealand engineer and politician
- Camille Mandrillon (1891–1969), French biathlete
- Camille Mansour (born 1945), Palestinian academic
- Camille Matignon (1867–1934), French chemist
- Camille Mauclair (1872–1945), French writer
- Camille Montagne (1784–1866), French botanist
- Camille Ournac (1845–1925), French politician
- Camille Pelletan (1846–1915), French politician and journalist
- Camille Pilet (1926–1994), Swiss watch salesperson and cult member
- Camille Pissarro (1830–1903), French-Danish impressionist painter
- Camille Pleyel (1788–1855), French musician
- Camille Roqueplan, French painter
- Camille Rousset (1821–1892), French historian
- Camille Saint-Saëns (1835–1921), French composer
- Camille Sée (1847–1919), French politician
- Camille Silvy (1834–1910), French photographer
- Camille Solon (1877–1960), British muralist and ceramist of French descent
- Camille Teisseire (1764–1842), French politician and businessman
- Camille Thériault (born 1955), Canadian politician
- Camille Tissot (1868–1917), French physicist
- Camille Alphonse Trézel (1780–1860), French general
- Camille van Camp (1834–1891), Belgian painter

== Female ==
- Camille Anderson (born 1978), American actress and model
- Camille Babut du Marès, Belgian violinist
- Camille Berlin (1866–?) was a French painter.
- Camille Bonora (born 1956), former Muppet performer
- Camille Catala (born 1991), French football player
- Camille Cheng (born 1993), Hong Kong competitive swimmer
- Camille A. Clare, American obstetrician and gynecologist
- Camille Claudel (1864–1943), French sculptor
- Camille Cosby (born 1944), American philanthropist
- Camille Coduri (born 1965), British actress
- Camille Cottin (born 1978), French actress and comedian
- Camille Dalmais (born 1978), French singer and musician, better known as Camille
- Camille De Pazzis (born 1978), French actress
- Camille Dela Rosa (born 1982), Filipino actress
- Camille Drevet (1881–1969), French anti-colonialist, feminist, and pacifist activist
- Camille de Morel (1547–1611), French poet and writer
- Camille Ford (born 1981), American television personality, actress and producer
- Camille Froidevaux-Metterie (born 1968), French philosopher, researcher and professor
- Camille Goldstone-Henry, Australian businesswoman and wildlife scientist
- Camille Grammer (born 1968), American reality television star
- Camille Guaty (born 1976), American actress
- Camille Herron (born 1981), American long-distance runner
- Camille Jedrzejewski (born 2002), French sport shooter
- Camille Keaton (born 1947), American actress
- Camille Kitt (born 1988), American actress and identical twin sister of Kennerly Kitt
- Camille Kostek (born 1992), American model and actress
- Camille Levin (born 1990), American soccer player
- Camille Munro (born 1991), Miss World Canada winner
- Camille Muffat (1989–2015), French swimmer
- Camille Natta (born 1977), French actress
- Camille Norment (born 1970), Norwegian-American multimedia artist
- Camille O'Sullivan (born 1970), British musician, vocalist and actress
- Camille Paglia (born 1947), American professor, author and critic
- Camille Pin (born 1981), French tennis player
- Camille Pellerin-Forget, Quebec politician
- Camille Prats (born 1985), Filipino actress
- Camille Ralphs (born 1992), English poet and critic
- Camille Rasmussen (born 2004), Danish gymnast
- Camille Rowe (born 1990), French model and actress
- Camille Saviola (1950–2021), Italian-American actress and singer
- Camille Seaman (born 1969), American photographer
- Camille Séri (born 1999), French hurdler
- Camille Stewart, American cybersecurity attorney
- Camille Sullivan (born 1975), Canadian actress
- Camille Surdez (born 1998), Swiss footballer
- Imbi-Camille Tamm (born 1970), Estonian violinist, better known as Camille
- Camille Thurman (born 1986), American jazz saxophonist and vocalist
- Camille Vasquez (born 1984), American lawyer
- Camille Villar (born 1985), Filipina politician
- Camille Zimmerman (born 1995), American basketball player

== Fictional characters ==
- Camille Raquin, Thérèse's first husband in Zola's Thérèse Raquin
- Camille (1936 film)
- Princess Camille, protagonist of Little Nemo: Adventures in Slumberland
- Camille, the main villainess in Power Rangers Jungle Fury
- Camille Miraflor-Legaspi, main character from the Philippine romantic drama series Marry Me, Marry You, portrayed by Janine Gutierrez
- Camille Castillo, a character from the Philippine action drama series FPJ's Batang Quiapo, portrayed by Yukii Takahashi
- Camille Montes, the lead Bond girl in the 2008 James Bond film Quantum of Solace
- Camille, a pseudonym used by Prince during the late 1980s and early 1990s
- Camille Leon, a fictional shapeshifting character from Kim Possible portrayed by Ashley Tisdale
- Camille Saroyan, character of the TV series Bones
- Camille the Wood Elf, character in Troll Tales
- Camille Bordey, a detective sergeant in the BBC series Death In Paradise
- Camille, a main character in the French TV series Les Revenants
- Camille Kenney, from Puppet Master II, portrayed by Nita Talbot
- Kamille Bidan, the protagonist of Mobile Suit Zeta Gundam
- Camille Preaker, protagonist of Sharp Objects
- Camille, a fighter style champion in League of Legends
- Camille O'Connell, see List of The Originals characters
- Camille Valentini, an assistant and later junior agent in Call My Agent!
- Camille Wallaby, a character in Alfred Hedgehog
- Camille Belcourt, a vampire in Cassandra Clare's The Mortal Instruments series
- Camille, a character from Project Moon's game Limbus Company
- Camille de Fleurville, a character in Sophie's misfortunes.
