= Kamilla =

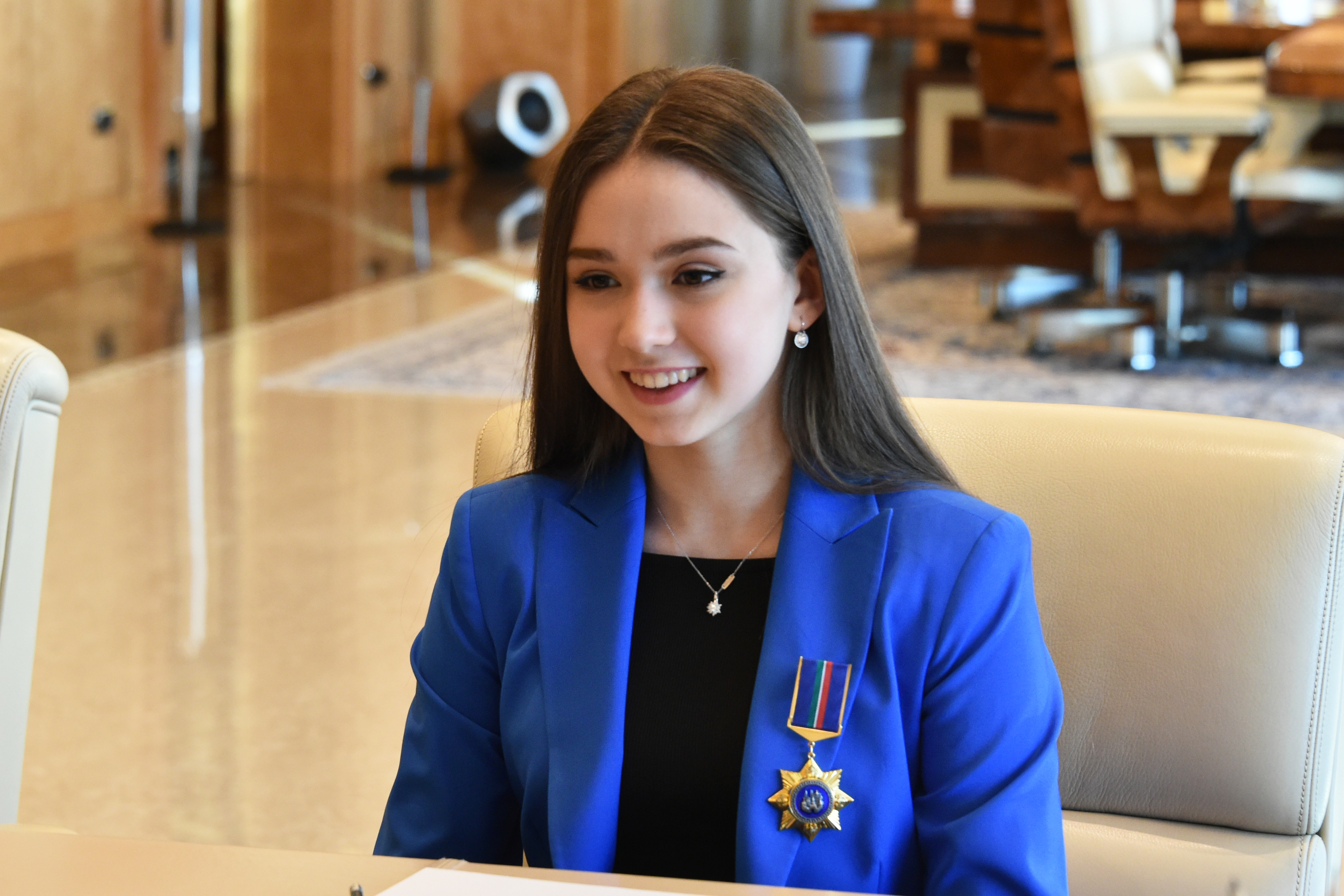
Kamila Valieva

Kamilla and Kamila are feminine given names used in a number of languages and throughout history with roots in Slavic, Arabic, and South Asian languages and Latin.

Both Kamila and Kamilla are popular names in Eastern Europe, Scandinavia, and Italy. The name Kamila in Arabic means perfection derived from the Arabic root Kamil (كامل and كميل). The name is a variation of the given name Kamala, a Sanskrit word meaning lotus that is common in Indian culture. The name is a variation of the Latin feminine of camillus, the root of Camilla (given name), a term for a youth serving as acolyte in the ritual of ancient Roman religion, which may be of Etruscan origin.

Common nicknames for Kamila include Kami, Mila, Kam, and Milly.

Notable people with these names include:

== Kamila ==
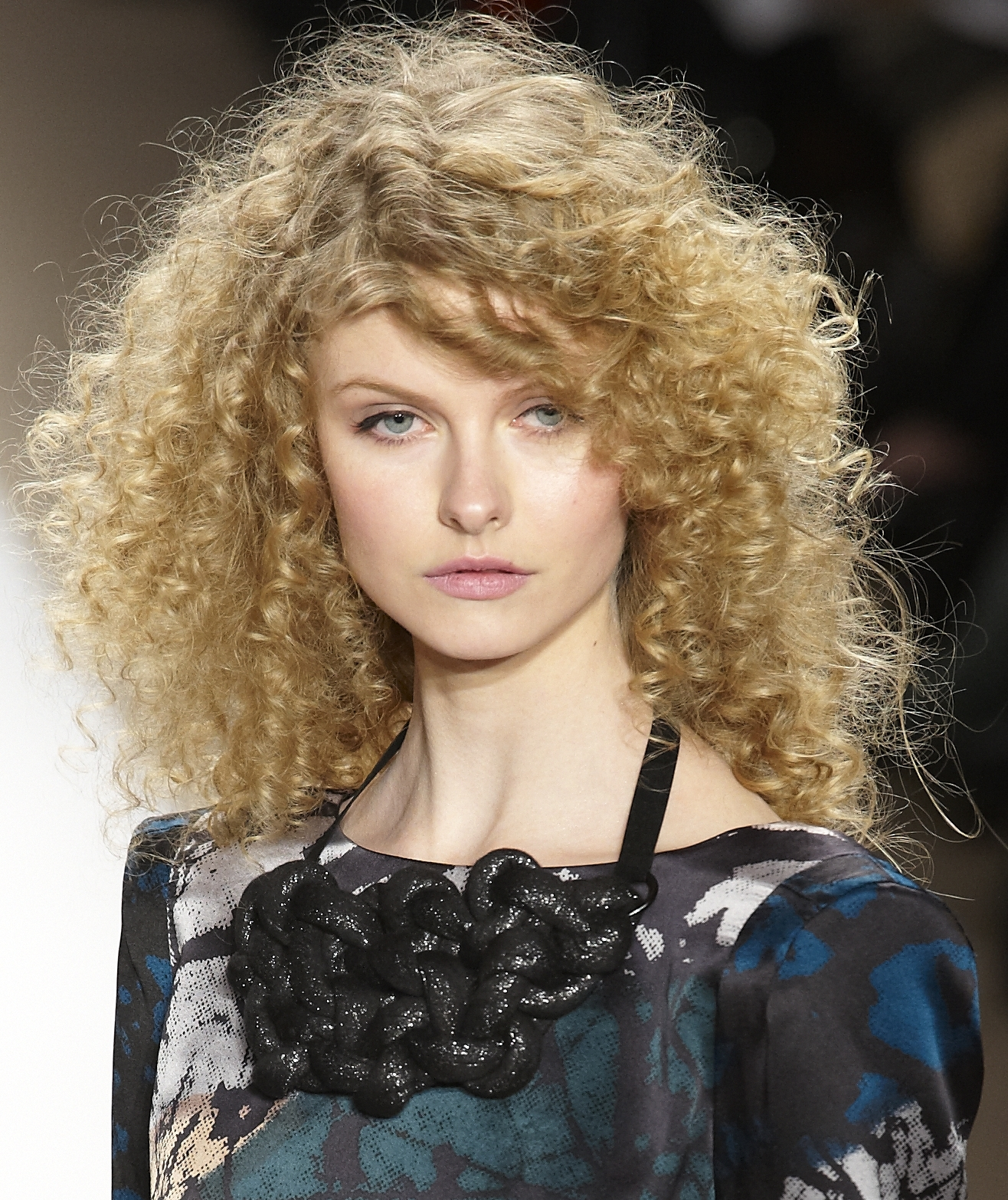
Kamila Filipcikova

- Kamila Aliyeva (born 1967), Azerbaijani politician
- Kamila Andini (born 1986), Indonesian film director
- Kamila Ainievna Badurova (born 1995), Russian judoka
- Kamila Barbosa (born 1988), Brazilian freestyle wrestler
- Kamila Chudzik (born 1986), Polish heptathlete
- Kamila Dubcová (born 1999), Czech professional footballer
- Kamila Filipcikova (born 1991), Slovak fashion model
- Kamila Gasiuk-Pihowicz (born 1983), Polish politician
- Kamila Gradus (born 1967), Polish marathon runner
- Kamila Grigorenko (born 2008), Estonian rhythmic gymnast
- Kamila Hawthorne, Welsh medical academic and a general practitioner
- Kamila Kerimbayeva (born 1995), Kazakhstan tennis player
- Kamila Konotop (born 2001), Ukrainian weightlifter
- Kamila Kordovská (born 1997), Czech handballer
- Kamila Kotulska (born 1985), Polish television journalist and broadcaster
- Kamila Kulmagambetova (born 1995), Kazakhstani footballer
- Kamila Lićwinko (born 1986), Polish track and field athlete
- Kamila Magálová (born 1950), a Slovak film and stage actress, singer, and entrepreneur
- Kamila Nasr, Canadian singer, composer and multi-instrumentalist
- Kamila Novotná (born 2005), Slovak sport shooter
- Kamila Shamsie (born 1973), British writer and novelist
- Kamila Skolimowska, (1982–2009), Polish hammer thrower and Olympic gold medalist
- Kamila Stösslová (1891–1935), Czech housewife and muse of composer Leoš Janáček
- Kamila Szczawińska (born 1984), Polish model
- Kamila Špráchalová (born 1971), Czech stage and television actress
- Kamila Thompson (born 1983), singer-songwriter based in London and New York
- Kamila Tyabji (1918–2004), Indian philanthropist and lawyer
- Kamila Valieva (born 2006), Russian figure skater
- Kamila Urzędowska (born 1994), Polish actress
- Kamila Ženatá (born 1953), Czech artist
- Kamila Żuk (born 1997), Polish biathlete

== Kamilla ==
- Kamilla Asylova (born 1998), Kazakhstani model, Miss Universe Kazakhstan 2016
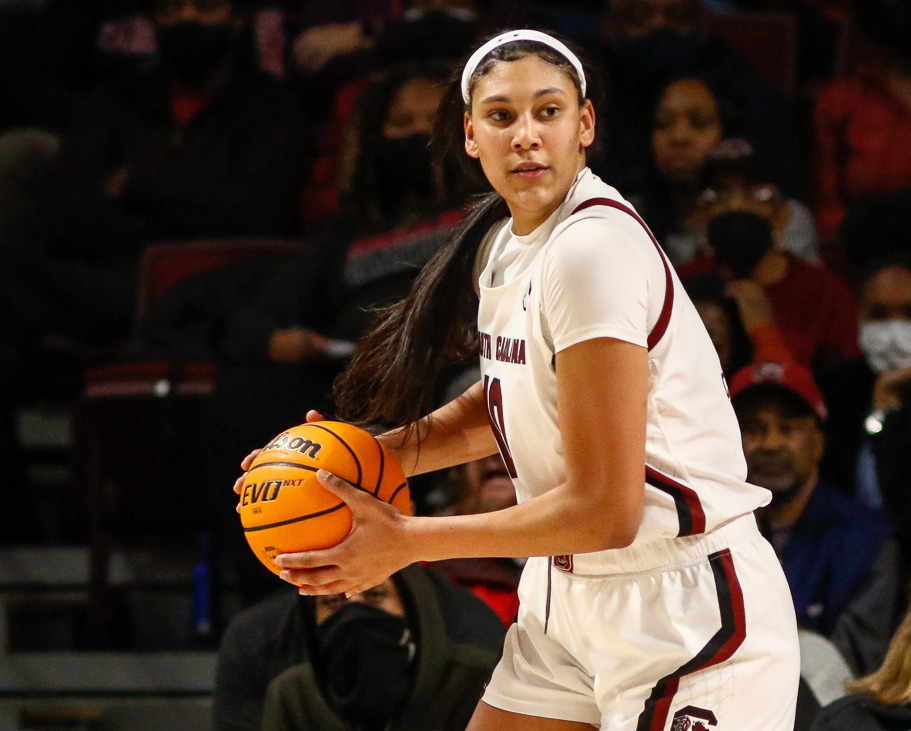
- Kamilla Cardoso
  Kamilla Cardoso (born 2001), Brazilian professional basketball player
- Kamilla Farhad (born 1996), Azerbaijani tennis player
- Kamilla Gafurzianova (born 1988), Russian female fencer
- Kamilla Hollai (1899–1967), Hungarian film actress of the silent era
- Kamilla Rytter Juhl (born 1983), Danish international elite badminton player
- Kamilla Kosztolányi (born 1956), Hungarian rower
- Kamilla Kristensen (born 1983), Danish team handball player
- Kamilla Melgård (born 2005), Norwegian footballer
- Kamilla Rakhimova (born 2001), Uzbekistani tennis player
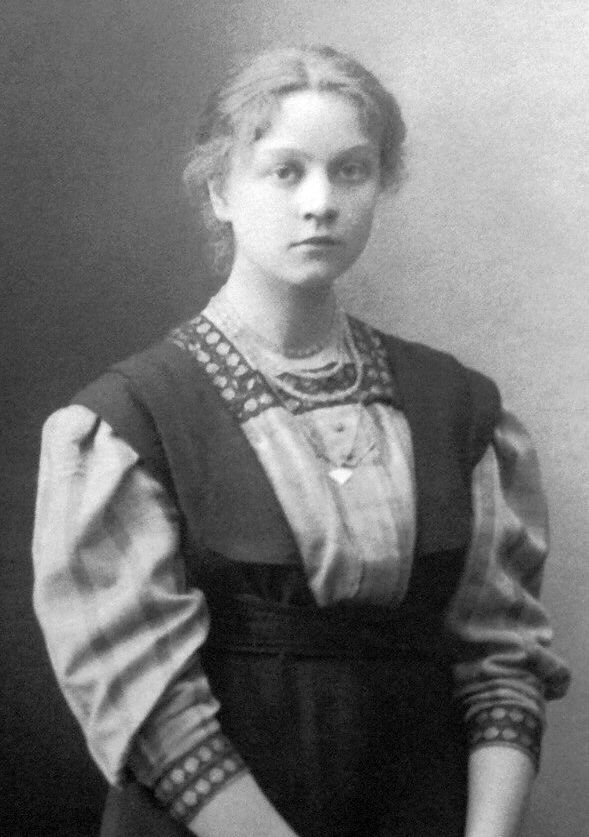
- Kamilla Trever
  Kamilla Seidler (born 1983), Danish chef, head chef at restaurant Gustu in La Paz, Bolivia
- Kamilla Składanowska (1948–2010), Polish fencer
- Kamilla Trever (1892–1974), Russian historian and orientalist, member of the Russian Academy of Sciences
- Kamilla Sofie Vallin (born 1993), Danish professional racing cyclist

== Kamila as a surname ==
- Avery Yale Kamila (born 1970s), American journalist

== Events with the given name Kamila ==
- Kamila Skolimowska Memorial, athletics tournament held in Poland

== Kamilla in popular culture ==
- Kamilla and the Thief (Kamilla og Tyven), Norwegian family movie from 1988
- Kamilla and the Thief II (Kamilla og Tyven II), Norwegian family movie from 1989

== See also ==
- Camilla (disambiguation)
- Kamala (disambiguation)
- Kamil
