= Camille =

Camille may refer to:

== Fictional entities ==
- A Power Rangers Jungle Fury character
- Camille Wallaby, a character in Alfred Hedgehog
- A character from League of Legends video game voiced by Emily O'Brien
- Princess Camille, a character in Little Nemo: Adventures in Slumberland

== Films ==
- Camille (1912 film), a short American film directed by Jay Hunt based on Dumas' novel La Dame aux camélias (The Lady of the Camellias)
- Camille (1915 film), an American silent film adapted by Frances Marion, directed by Albert Capellani, starring Clara Kimball Young as Camille and Paul Capellani as Armand
- Camille (1917 film), an American silent film adapted by Adrian Johnson, directed by J. Gordon Edwards, starring Theda Bara as Camille
- Camille (1921 film), an American silent film starring Alla Nazimova as Camille and Rudolph Valentino as Armand
- Camille (1926 short film), an American short film by Ralph Barton, compiled from his home movies, loosely based on La Dame aux Camélias
- Camille (1927 film), an American silent film adapted by Fred de Gresac and company, directed by Fred Niblo, starring Norma Talmadge as Camille and Gilbert Roland as Armand
- Camille (1936 film), an Academy Award nominated American film directed by George Cukor, starring Greta Garbo as Marguerite and Robert Taylor as Armand
- Camille (1984 film), a television film adapted by Blanche Hanalis, directed by Desmond Davis, starring Greta Scacchi as Camille and Colin Firth as Armand
- Camille 2000, an Italian film adapted by Michael DeForrest, directed by Radley Metzger, starring Danièle Gaubert as Marguerite and Nino Castelnuovo as Armand
- Camille (2008 film), a 2008 comedy drama film starring Sienna Miller and James Franco
- La signora delle camelie, an 1915 Italian silent film adapted by Renzo Chiosso, directed by Gustavo Serena, starring Francesca Bertini as Camille

== Music ==
- Camille (album), an unreleased project by the musician Prince
- La traviata, an opera by Giuseppe Verdi

== Novels ==
- La Dame aux Camélias, a novel by Alexandre Dumas fils, commonly known in English as Camille
- Camille (Lemaitre novel), a 2012 novel by Pierre Lemaitre
- Camille (Matilda Heron Translation), an English translation of La Dame aux Camélias by Matilda Heron
- Camille (Charles Ludlam play), an American play by Charles Ludlam

== People ==
- Camille (given name), a male or female given name
- Camille (French singer), full name Camille Dalmais, French singer and songwriter
- Camille (Belgian singer), full name Camille Dhont, Belgian singer and actress
- Camille (American singer), full name Camille Filfiley, American singer and recording artist
- Camille (violinist), full name Imbi-Camille Tamm, Estonian violinist

== Other uses ==
- Camille (ballet), a 1990 ballet by Veronica Paeper
- "Camille" (Red Dwarf), an episode from series 4 of Red Dwarf
- Hurricane Camille (1969), one of the most destructive storms to make landfall in the United States
- Camille (Monet) or The Woman in the Green Dress, an 1866 painting by Claude Monet
- Camille’s (Providence, Rhode Island) (1914) oldest Italian restaurant in Rhode Island

== See also ==
- Kamille
- Camilla (disambiguation)
- Kamil
- The Lady of the Camellias (disambiguation)
