= Kamil =

- Pronunciation: Polish: [ˈkamil] Czech: [ˈkamɪl] Slovak: [ˈkamil] Arabic: [ˈkaːmɪl]
- Gender: male

Origin
- Origin: Polish, Czech, Slovak, Turkish, Arabic.
- Meaning: Polish/Czech/Slovak: None (Latin/Etruscan origin); Arabic: Perfect

Other names
- Related names: Kamila, Camillus, Camille, Camilla, Camila, Kamill

Kamil is a name used in a number of languages.

Kamil (Polish: [ˈkamil]) is a Polish, Czech, and Slovak given name, equivalent to the Italian Camillo, Spanish/Portuguese Camilo and French Camille. It is derived from Camillus, a Roman family name, which is sometimes claimed to mean "attendant at a religious service" in Latin, but may actually be of unknown Etruscan origin. The female version is Kamila, equivalent to English Camilla or Camila.

Kamil is also a Turkish name, with the female version Kamile. These names were common during Ottoman Empire and are not as common in Turkey today.

Kamil (كامل and كميل) is also an Arabic name, sometimes used as an adjective, more usually transliterated as Kamil and Kameel which can be translated as "perfect" or "the Perfect One". It is also used in Somali, Urdu, Persian, Pashto, Kurdish, and other languages, with a meaning ranging between "perfect", "complete", and "full".

In Islamic theology, al-Insān al-Kāmil (Arabic: اَلإِنْسَانِ الكَامِلْ, Turkish: İnsan-ı Kâmil, Persian: انسانِ کامل), is a term used as an honorific title to describe Muhammad. It is an Arabic phrase meaning "the person who has reached perfection".

== Given name ==
- Al-Kamil, Kurdish Ayyubid sultan, nephew of Saladin
- Kamil Bednář, Czech poet
- Kamil Bednarek, Polish musician
- Kamil Bortniczuk (born 1983), Polish Minister of Sport and Tourism
- Kamil Čontofalský, Slovak footballer
- Kamil Ahmet Çörekçi, Turkish footballer
- Kamil Damašek, Czech decathlete
- Kamil Durczok, Polish journalist
- Kamil Glik, Polish footballer
- Kamil Grosicki, Polish footballer
- Kamil Hornoch, Czech astronomer
- Kamil Idris (born 1954), Sudanese politician
- Kamil Kopúnek, Slovak footballer
- Kamil Kosowski, Polish footballer
- Kamil Krofta, Czech politician and historian
- Kamil Özerk, Norwegian-Turkish Cypriot educator and professor
- Kâmil Pasha (1833–1913), Turkish Cypriot statesman and grand vizier of the Ottoman Empire
- Kamil Patel (born 1979), Mauritian former tennis player
- Kamil Pooran (born 1966), Trinidadian cricketer
- Kamil Rustam (born 1962), French musician
- Kamil Sindi (1932–2017), former Director General of Saudi Arabian Airlines
- Kamil Stoch (born 1987), Polish ski jumper
- Kamil Tvrdek (born 1983), Czech ice hockey player
- Kamil Šaško (born 1985), Slovak politician
- Kamil Wilczek (born 1988), Polish footballer
- Kamil Yusuf Al-Bahtimi (1922–1969), Egyptian quranic reciter
- Kamil Zeman (1882–1952), Czech writer, journalist and translator of German prose
- Kamil Zvelebil (1927–2009), Czech linguist specializing in South Asia
- Wan Kamil Mohamed Shafian (1967–2002), Singaporean murderer

=== Kameel ===
- Kameel Ahmady, British-Iranian social anthropologist

== Middle name ==
- Krzysztof Kamil Baczyński, Polish poet
- Cyprian Kamil Norwid, Polish poet

== Surname ==
=== Kamil ===
- Harun Kamil, Indonesian lawyer
- Mike Kamil, American bridge player
- Mustafa Kamil Pasha, Egyptian lawyer and nationalist leader
- Omer Kamil, Sri Lankan politician
- Ridwan Kamil, Indonesian politician

=== Kameel ===
- Fathi Kameel (1955–2026), Kuwaiti football player

== Fictional characters ==
- Kamil, the main protagonist of the 13th century Arabic novel, The Treatise of Kamil, also known as Theologus Autodidactus.
- Kamil Dowanna is a human knight from Produce and Enix's The 7th Saga for the SNES.
- Kamille Bidan, also known as Kamil Bidan, the protagonist of the anime series Mobile Suit Zeta Gundam and a character in Mobile Suit Gundam ZZ.

== Places ==
- Kameel-rivier B, a village in the low-veld region of KwaNdebele, in the Nkangala District Municipality of the Mpumalanga province of South Africa
- Kamil Crater, the meteorite impact crater in Egypt
- Kamil, Osmancık

== Books ==
- The Complete History, known in Arabic as the Tareekh Kamil, written by Ali ibn al-Athir in 1231
