= Gregg's Restaurants & Taverns =

Casual restaurant chain in Rhode Island

- Type: Private
- Industry: Restaurants
- Genre: Casual dining
- Founded: 1972
- Founder: Edmund "Ted" Fuller
- Headquarters: Warwick, Rhode Island, United States
- Number of locations: 4 (Warwick, Providence, East Providence, North Kingstown)
- Area served: Rhode Island
- Key people: Bob Bacon (President)
- Products: American cuisine
- Website: www.greggsusa.com

Gregg’s Restaurants & Taverns is a privately held regional casual restaurant chain based in Warwick, Rhode Island, United States. Established in 1972 with its first location in Warwick, the company has expanded to additional sites in Providence, East Providence, and North Kingstown. The chain specializes in American cuisine and desserts. To support operations, Gregg’s operates a commissary in Pawtucket, which produces desserts, soups, dressings, and other items for its four restaurants.

== History ==
In 1972, Edmund Fuller acquired a restaurant in receivership in Warwick, Rhode Island, and converted it into the first Gregg’s restaurant. The name “Gregg’s” was retained from the previous owner of the site. The original restaurant was positioned as a New York-deli motif in its menu design, including items such as deli sandwiches, and was expanded with more robust dessert and dinner offerings. As the concept proved viable, additional Gregg's locations opened in East Providence in 1979, Providence in 1985, and North Kingstown in 1993. To support production for multiple sites, a central commissary was established in Pawtucket, primarily focused on bakery operations.

In the early 1980s, Edmund and his brother Bill Fuller developed POSitouch, a touchscreen-based point-of-sale system first tested in Gregg’s restaurants to replace handwritten tickets and improve inventory and sales tracking. Fuller later founded Restaurant Data Concepts, Inc. to market the system, which by the late 1980s had been adopted by restaurants across New England, with the Warwick Gregg’s location continuing as a test site for updates into the 2000s.

Beginning in the early 2000s through 2016, new and renovated locations incorporated dedicated bar areas branded as “tavern” sections that were physically separated from the main dining room. Fuller retired in 2008, transferring ownership and management responsibilities to business associate Bob Bacon. Fuller died in January 2021 at the age of 86. On October 31, 2014, following a speech at Rhode Island College, President Barack Obama visited Gregg’s Providence location with Democratic gubernatorial candidate Gina Raimondo and purchased a “Death by Chocolate” cake.

== See also ==
- Chelo's Hometown Bar & Grill
- Newport Creamery
