= Camil =

Camil is a masculine given name with Arabic, Romanian and French origins.

In French it's a variation of Camille. The source of the name is the Latin Camillus.

In Arabic, it means perfect, accomplished or complete. Camil in arabic can also be spelled Kamil, Kamel, Camel, Kamal or Camal.

People named Camil:

- Camil Baltazar (1902–1977)
- Camil Bouchard (born 1945)
- Camil Doua (born 2002), Mauritanian swimmer
- Camil Mureșanu (1927–2015)
- Camil Petrescu (1894–1957)
- Camil Ressu (1880–1962)
- Camil Samson (1935–2012)
- Scott Camil (born May 19, 1946), American veteran and anti-war activist
