= Özerk =

Turkish surname

Özerk is a Turkish surname and male given name formed by the combination of the Turkish words öz ("gist; kernel") and erk ("power", "authority", "validity"). Notable people with the name include:

== Surname ==
- Kamil Özerk (born 1954), Norwegian-Turkish Cypriot professor of pedagogy
