= Kamille =

Kamille may refer to:

- Kamille (musician) (born 1988), British singer-songwriter
- Kamille (wrestler) (born 1992), American professional wrestler

== See also ==
- Camille (given name)
- Kamilla
