= Camillo =

Disambiguation page

Camillo is an Italian masculine given name, descended from Latin Camillus. Its Slavic cognate is Kamil.

== People ==
- Camillo Agrippa, Italian Renaissance fencer, architect, engineer and mathematician
- Camillo Almici (1714–1779), Italian priest, theologian and literary critic
- Camillo Astalli (1616–1663), Italian cardinal
- Camillo Benso, conte di Cavour (1810–1861), a leading figure in the movement toward Italian unification, founder of the original Italian Liberal Party and Prime Minister of the Kingdom of Piedmont-Sardinia
- Camillo Berlinghieri (1590 or 1605–1635), Italian painter
- Camillo Berneri (1897–1937), Italian professor of philosophy, anarchist militant, propagandist and theorist
- Camillo Boccaccino (c. 1504 – 1546), Italian painter
- Camillo Boito (1836–1914), Italian architect, engineer, art critic, art historian and novelist
- Camillo Borghese (1550–1621), Pope Paul V, the Pope who persecuted Galileo Galilei
- Camillo Borghese, 6th Prince of Sulmona (1775–1832), brother-in-law of Napoleon
- Camillo Camilli (c. 1704 – 1754), master luthier
- Camillo Candiani (1841–1919), Italian admiral and senator of the Kingdom of Italy
- Camillo Caracciolo, 2nd Prince of Avellino (1563−1630), military leader and statesman of the Kingdom of Naples
- Camillo Castiglione or Castiglioni (1517–1598), Italian nobleman and condottiero
- Camillo Castiglioni (1879–1957), Italian-Austrian financier and banker
- Camillo Federici (1749–1802), Italian dramatist and actor
- Camillo Finocchiaro Aprile (1851–1916), Italian jurist and politician
- Camillo Golgi (1843–1926), Italian physician, pathologist, scientist, and Nobel laureate
- Camillo Jerusalem (1914–1979), Austrian football player
- Camillo Laurenti (1861–1938), Italian Roman Catholic cardinal
- Count Camillo Marcolini (1739–1814), minister and general director of the fine arts for the Electorate, later Kingdom of Saxony
- Camillo Mariani (1565–1611), Italian sculptor
- Camillo Massimo (1620–1677), Italian cardinal
- Camillo Mastrocinque (1901–1969), Italian film director and screenwriter
- Camillo Mazzella (1833–1900), Italian Jesuit theologian and cardinal
- Camillo Wong "Chino" Moreno, known as Chino Moreno (born 1973), American musician, lead-vocalist of alternative metal band Deftones
- Camillo Olivetti (1868–1943), Italian electrical engineer and founder of Olivetti & Co., SpA.
- Camillo Orsini (1492–1559), Italian leader and Captain General of the Church
- Camillo Pacetti (1758–1826), Italian sculptor
- Camillo Francesco Maria Pamphili (1622–1666), Italian cardinal and nobleman
- Camillo Peano (1863–1930), Italian jurist and politician
- Camillo Pilotto (1890–1963), Italian film actor
- Camillo Procaccini (1551–1629), Italian painter
- Camillo Rizzi (1580–1618), Italian painter
- Camillo Rondani (1808–1879), Italian entomologist
- Camillo Ruini (born 1931), Italian Roman Catholic cardinal
- Camillo Rusconi (1658–1728), Italian sculptor
- Camillo Sbarbaro (1888–1967), Italian poet, writer and lichenologist
- Camillo Sitte (1843–1903), Austrian architect, painter and city planning theoretician
- Camillo Sivori (1815–1894), Italian virtuoso violinist and composer
- Camillo Tarquini (1810–1874), Italian cardinal, Jesuit canonist and archaeologist
- Camillo Togni (1922–1993), Italian composer, teacher and pianist
- Camillo Ugi (1884–1970), German football player
- Camillo Vaz (born 1975), French football manager
- Camillo Walzel (1829–1895), German librettist and theatre director

== Fictional characters ==
- Don Camillo, in the short stories of Italian writer and journalist Giovannino Guareschi

== See also ==
- Camilo (disambiguation)
