= Camillus =

Camillus may refer to:

- A young assistant in religious ritual in ancient Rome
- Camillus (feminine Camilla), a cognomen in ancient Rome
  - A hereditary cognomen in the gens Furia
    - Marcus Furius Camillus
  - A given name derived from the cognomen, see Camille (disambiguation)
- Camillus, New York may refer to either of the following jurisdictions in Onondaga County:
  - Camillus, New York
  - Camillus (village), New York, wholly contained within the town
- Camillus Cutlery Company
