= Louis-Nicolas Cabat =

French painter (1812–1893)

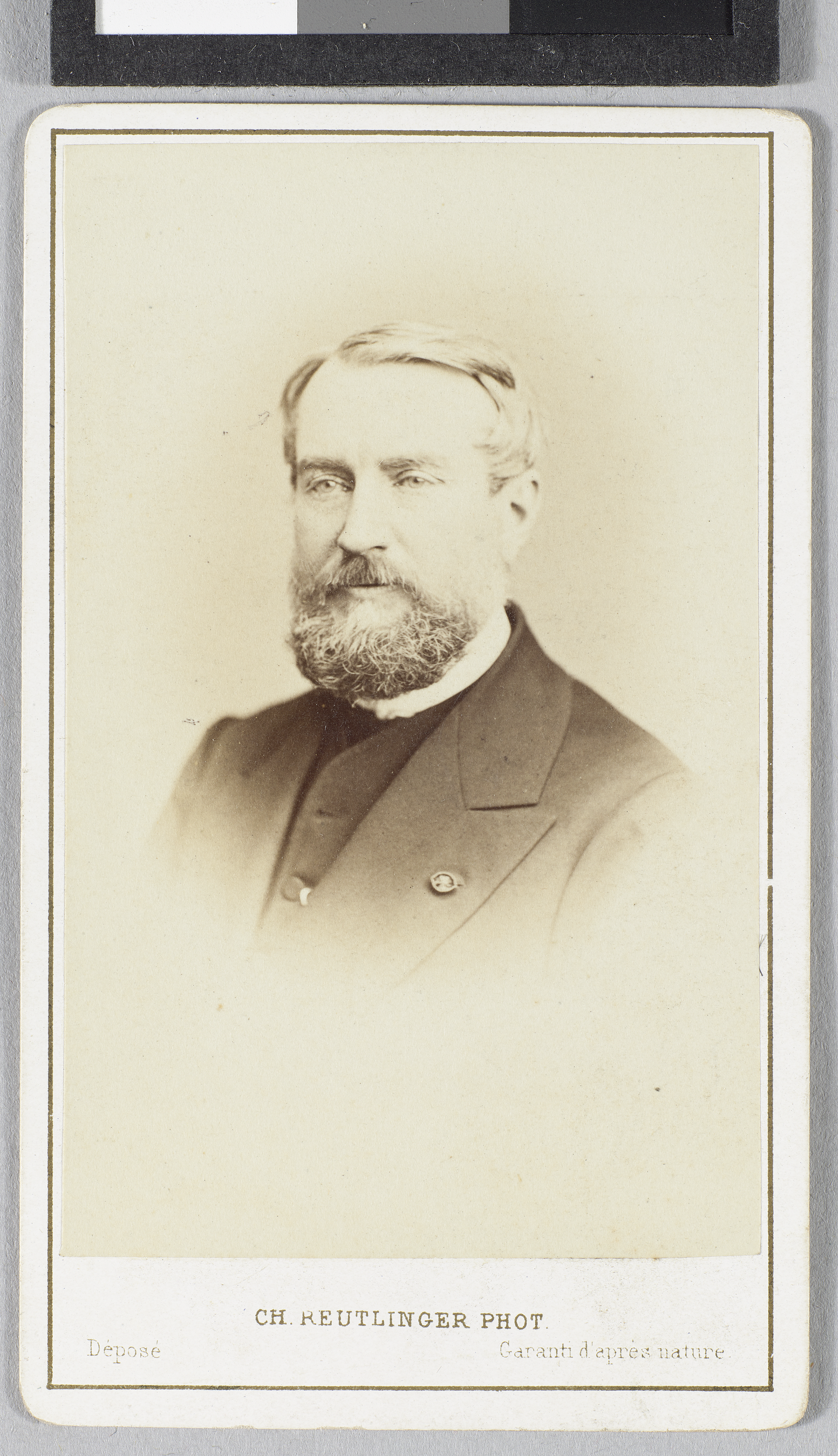
Carte de visite of Louis-Nicolas Cabat

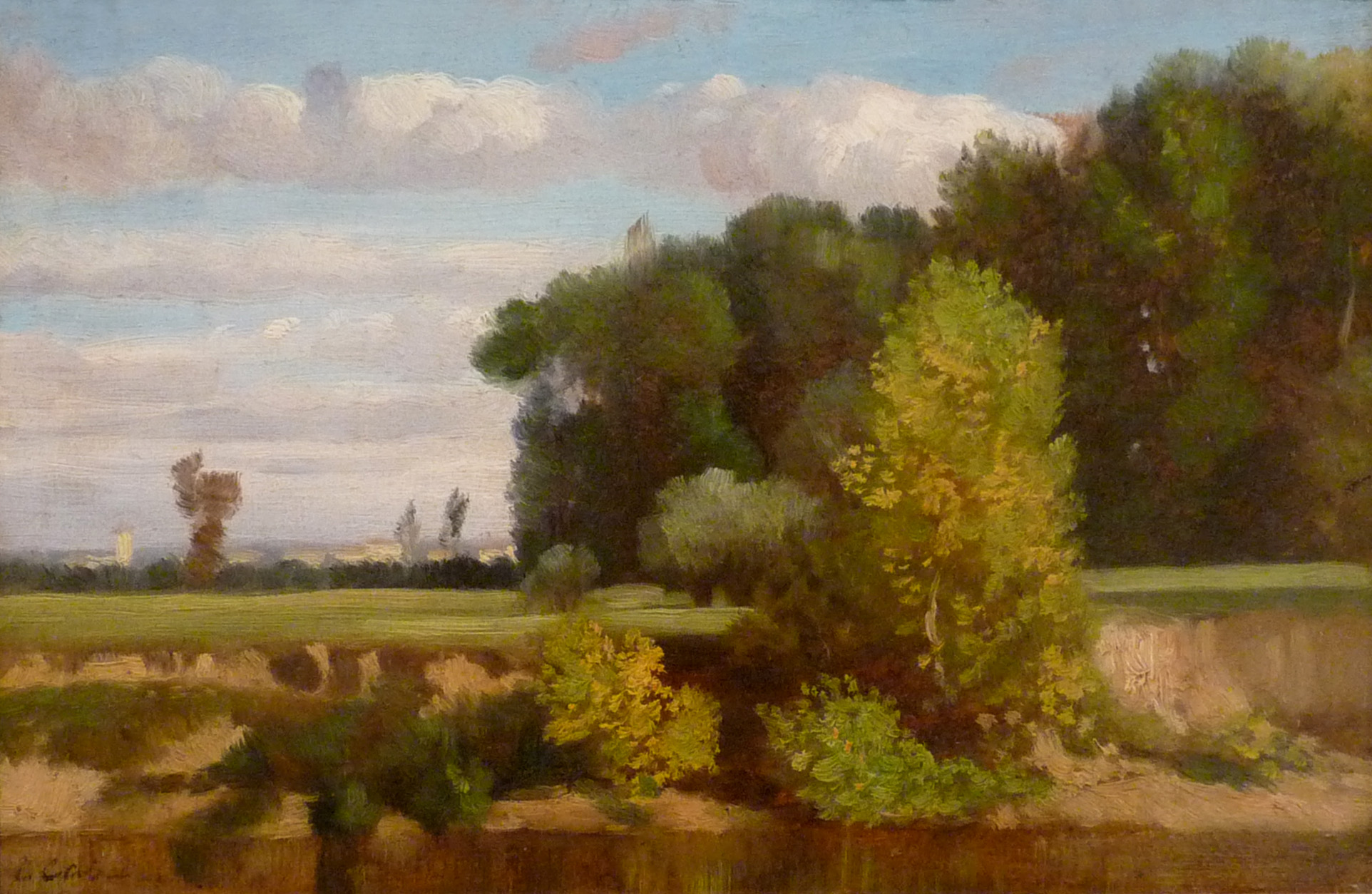
Landscape (untitled?)

Louis-Nicolas Cabat (French: [lwi nikɔla kaba]; 6 December 1812 in Paris – 13 March 1893 in Paris) was a French landscape painter.

He was one of the most illustrious students of Camille Flers. He drew notice for his exhibits at the Salon of 1833. A member of the Accademia di San Luca in Rome, Cabat was elected a member of the Académie des Beaux-Arts of the Institut de France in 1867 and was director of the French Academy in Rome from 1879 to 1884.

In 1883 Cabat travelled in France with his friends Constant Troyon and Jules Dupré in search of landscapes.

== Works ==
- Cabaret à Montsouris
- Le Moulin de Dompierre
- Les Bords de la Bouzanne
- L'intérieur d'un Bois
- L'Étang de Ville-d'Avray
- Le Bois de Fontenay-aux-Roses
- Intérieur d'un Métaierie dans le Calvados
- La Gorge-Aux-Loups (seine et marne)
- Fête de la Vierge à l'eau,
- Oiseleur à l'affût
- Chemin dans la vallée de Narni
- Solitude
