= Interactive Encyclopedia of the Palestine Question =

Online encyclopedia on Palestinian history

- Available in: English; Arabic
- Founded: 2 June 2022; 4 years ago
- Creators: Institute for Palestine Studies; The Palestinian Museum
- Website: www.palquest.org

The Interactive Encyclopedia of the Palestine Question (PalQuest) is an online encyclopedia on the subject of the Palestinian question. It was launched in June 2022 by the Institute for Palestine Studies and The Palestinian Museum.

The Institute for Palestine Studies (IPS) and The Palestinian Museum announced the launch of the bilingual English and Arabic encyclopedia on 2 June 2022 via a press release, with IPS editor-in-chief Camille Mansour describing its intent "to introduce a description of the Palestine Question that is simultaneously committed and objective to present Palestinians as they are". The launch date was intended to commemorate the 74th anniversary of the 1948 Nakba. The joint project serves as an online platform for information regarding Palestinian history from the Ottoman period in the 16th century onwards, including chronologies, places, biographies, as well as historical materials such as photos and videos.
