= The Lady of the Camellias (disambiguation) =

The Lady of the Camellias is a novel by Alexandre Dumas.

The Lady of the Camellias may also refer to:

- The Lady of the Camellias (1915 Negroni film), an Italian historical drama film
- The Lady of the Camellias (1915 Serena film), an Italian historical drama film
- The Lady of the Camellias (1925 film), a Swedish silent historical drama film directed by Olof Molander
- The Lady of the Camellias (1934 film), a French film directed by Abel Gance
- The Lady of the Camellias (1944 film), a 1944 Mexican historical drama film by Gabriel Soria
- The Lady of the Camellias (1947 film), an Italian film directed by Carmine Gallone
- The Lady of the Camellias (1953 French-Italian film), a French-Italian film directed by Raymond Bernard
- The Lady of the Camellias (1953 Argentine film), an Argentine melodrama film directed by Ernesto Arancibia
- The Lady of the Camellias (1981 film), a French-Italian drama film
