= Chelo's Hometown Bar & Grille =

Casual restaurant chain in Rhode Island

- Company type: Private
- Industry: Restaurant
- Founded: 1955
- Founder: Four brothers: James, Amet, Glenn, and Craig Chelo
- Headquarters: Cumberland, Rhode Island, United States of America
- Number of locations: 8 (as of 2025)
- Area served: Rhode Island, USA
- Key people: Jay Chelo (President)
- Products: American cuisine including burgers, seafood, salads, and desserts
- Services: Dine-in, takeout, catering, and banquet services
- Website: https://chelos.com/

Chelo's Hometown Bar & Grille is a chain of casual American-style restaurants located in the state of Rhode Island. It is Rhode Island's largest local family-owned restaurant company and operates eight locations across the state. The chain offers a variety of menu items and operates a central commissary in Warwick to supplement operations. Since the company's founding in 1955, the Chelo family has privately owned the chain.

== History ==
In the early 1950s, mill worker Hysen Chelo purchased a piece of property on Mendon Road in Cumberland, Rhode Island, as an investment. His four children—James, Amet, Glenn, and Craig Chelo—envisioned establishing a restaurant on the site. At the time, the town of Cumberland was experiencing a rapid period of economic transition from industrial manufacturing-oriented production towards post-war suburbanization, in turn increasing demand for affordable dining establishments in the region. In 1955, the brothers established Chelo's Steak House, serving standard American-style fare and specialized in steak sandwiches. The restaurant proved popular within its first years of operation, and a second location on Newport Avenue in Rumford, East Providence opened in 1962.

Throughout the 1970s and 1980s, Chelo's expanded its operations across Rhode Island, establishing additional locations in suburban areas of Providence, Cranston, and Wakefield. The chain was renamed to Chelo's Hometown Bar & Grille during this time. The company constructed a central commissary in Warwick during this period to ensure consistency. The commissary supplies soups, sauces, baked goods, and desserts to all locations, a practice that continues today. By 2005, Chelo's Hometown Bar & Grille had become the largest family-owned restaurant chain in Rhode Island by number of locations and collectively employed over 1,000 individuals.

In 2004, a legal dispute arose within the Chelo family. Jay Chelo, a family member who had previously been involved in the business, opened an Italian-themed restaurant called Mozzarella's in North Providence. This led to a lawsuit (Chelo's of Woonsocket, Inc. v. Chelo) from other Chelo family members and their restaurant entities, citing a violation of a non-compete agreement established in 2001. The court ultimately denied the preliminary injunction against Jay Chelo, ruling that the plaintiffs failed to demonstrate irreparable harm, which was necessary to enforce the non-compete clause. In 2021, allegations surfaced that funds from Amet Chelo's trust were used by other family members, leaving him financially destitute. This situation brought attention to disputes over financial management within the family.

== Locations and menu offerings ==
As of 2025, the chain operates eight locations in Rhode Island including Cranston, East Providence, Rumford, Providence, Smithfield, Warwick, Greewich Bay, and Woonsocket. The Chelo's company logo features caricatures of the original four Chelo brothers, which is widely used in marketing. All of Chelo's locations (excluding Chelo's Waterfront location) share the same menu, featuring a mix of American dishes such as burgers, sandwiches, salads, pasta, and seafood. Chelo's Waterfront, located near Greenwich Bay, serves as an upscale dining concept with a unique seafood-centric menu compared to the other locations. Every location features an extensive bar area; most locations feature banquet facilities for private events and catering services. The commissary in Warwick supplies all locations with pre-prepared soups, sauces, baked breads, and desserts to maintain consistency in food quality.

=== Closed locations ===
The company previously operated four additional locations that have since closed: Warwick Mall, Airport Road (also in Warwick), Wakefield, and the original location in Cumberland. The Warwick Mall location, which was attached to the mall, permanently closed in March 2010 due to extensive flooding that damaged the mall. The Airport Road location operated as Chelo’s "Good to Go," a short-lived fast-casual concept with a drive-through, which was open from 2004 to 2007. The Wakefield location struggled with underperformance and ceased operating under the Chelo’s name in 2009. It was subsequently converted into a Rhode Island–themed sports bar called Rhody Joe’s in 2010, which remained in business until 2017. The original Chelo’s on Mendon Road in Cumberland closed in 1990 and was replaced by Davenport’s, a competing local chain of American restaurants. Despite the closure, Chelo’s maintains its corporate offices in Cumberland.

== See also ==
- List of restaurants in Rhode Island
- Ninety Nine Restaurant - similar restaurant chain based in Woburn, Massachusetts
