= Kamila Kotulska =

Polish sports journalist and broadcaster (born 1985)

- Born: 22 October 1985 (age 41); Kraków, Poland
- Occupations: Broadcaster; Journalist; Computer scientist
- Years active: 2017–present
- Known for: Formula 1; Football
- Notable work: Canal+; Orange Sport; Viaplay; GRADIS

Kamila Kotulska (born 22 October 1985) is a Polish sports journalist and broadcaster. She has worked as an expert on Formula One motor racing for the broadcaster Viaplay and for Orange Sport and Canal+ Sport on motor racing, football, tennis and winter sport. Kotulska has also worked in accounting and outscouring at IBM and as General Manager of Sales and Marketing at startup lighting company Gradis.

== Biography ==
Kotulska was born on 22 October 1985, and comes from Kraków. Her fahter, Leszek Kotulski, is a professor at the Department of Applied Computer Science at the Faculty of Electrical Engineering, Automatics, Computer Science and Biomedical Engineering at the AGH University of Science and Technology in Kraków. She graduated from the Krakow University of Economics with a degree in Computer Science and Econometrics and completed her post-graduate studies at the AGH University of Krakow with a degree in Financial Mathematics and Internet Marketing.

Kotulska worked at IBM, where she had responsibility for accounting and outsourcing, and also as General Manager of Sales and Marketing at lighting company Gradis, a startup company founded by her father. She began her career in journalism as a reporter and presenter for Orange Sport and on several programmes for Canal+ Sport such as Liga+ Extra. Kotulsuka also created and edited video content and also worked in marketing and public relations. She focused on Formula One motor racing, other motorsports, tennis and winter sport and worked for Telewizja Polska. Between October 2017 and January 2022, she was employed by the broadcasting production company Ekstraklasa Live Park. Kotulska worked in configuring or monitoring the operating parameters of individual devices during Ekstraklasa football matches.

In February 2023, following the acquisition of the Polish broadcasting rights of Formula One by Viaplay from Eleven Sports, Kotulska was announced as a member of the company's editorial team as an expert. Kamila Kotulska knew the head of Viaplay's sports editorial office, Paweł Wilkowicz from her days at Orange Sport. When he was establishing the F1 editorial team, he approached her about working with him, remembering her passion for the sport. She works live from the studio.
