= Camille Matignon =

French chemist (1867–1934)

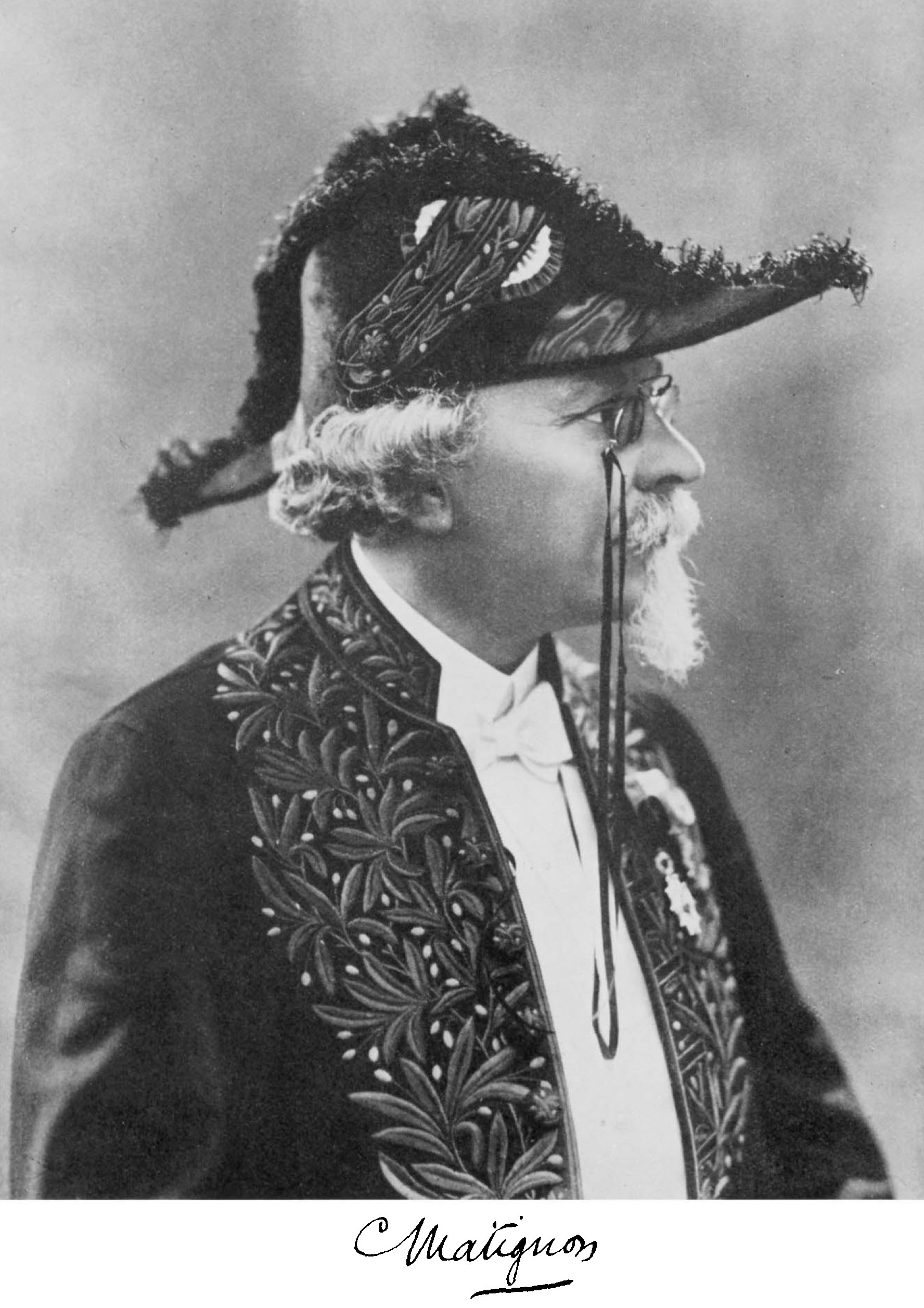
- Born: 3 January 1867; Saint-Maurice-aux-Riches-Hommes, France
- Died: 18 March 1934 (aged 67); Paris, France

Arthème Camille Matignon (French pronunciation: [kamij matiɲɔ̃]; 3 January 1867 – 18 March 1934) was a French chemist noted for his work in thermochemistry. He was a member of the Académie des Sciences, President of the French Chemical Society and an honorary Fellow of the British Chemical Society.

== Biography ==
Matignon was born in a small village of Saint-Maurice-aux-Riches-Hommes in Burgundy. He studied first at the school of St. François de Salles at Troyes and then at the Lycée Condorcet and Ecole Normale in Paris (1886). After graduating in 1889 he became an assistant at the Collège de France. His experimental work in thermochemistry was summarised in a doctorate thesis. In 1893 Matignon became a lecturer at the University of Lille and in 1894 Director of bleaching, dyeing and finishing at the Institut Industriel du Nord. In 1898, he was appointed a lecturer at the Sorbonne and an assistant professor at the Collège de France, where he later served as Chair of Inorganic Chemistry from 1908 till his death. He was decorated as a Chevalier of the Légion d’honneur in 1908 and elected a member of the Académie des Sciences in 1926. Matignon became President of the French Chemical Society in 1932 and an honorary Fellow of the British Chemical Society in 1933. Matignon was a talented orator and writer, noted for his enthusiasm and extravagant dressing style.

== Research ==
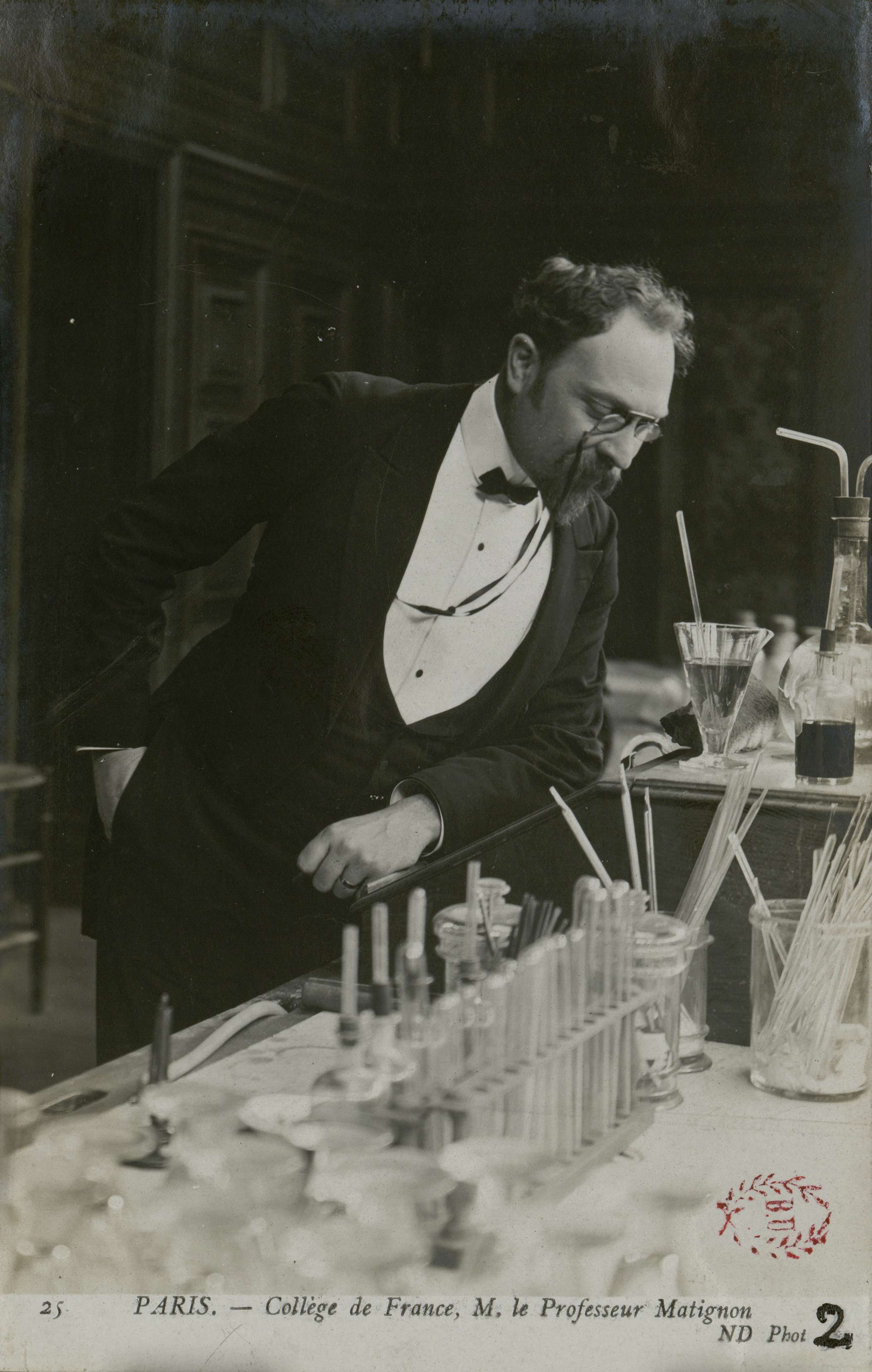
Collège de France. Professor Matignon (Bibliothèque de la Sorbonne, NuBIS)

In his early years, Matignon studied heat of combustion for major gaseous hydrocarbons and standard enthalpy of formation for ethanol, formic acid, acetic acid and various sugars. He extended this work to a family of 70 urea derivatives and formulated several thermochemical rules, for example, that the replacement of hydrogen attached to nitrogen by an alkyl radical increases the heat of combustion more than when the replacement is carried out at a carbon atom. This led to such practical conclusions as nitric esters are more powerful explosives than nitro-derivatives. Those urea studies aimed to understand the processes occurring in living organisms and hinted that formic acid and urea should react at ambient conditions and form formylurea.

After his return to the Collège de France in 1898 Matignon generalised his work to the thermodynamics of chemical systems and formulated an empirical law which Walther Nernst named the "Le Chatelier-Matignon rule". The law stated that for an equilibrated system of one gaseous and one or more solid phases the ratio of the heat Q evolved at constant pressure and of the temperature T at which the gaseous pressure is equal one atmosphere is Q/T = 32. This law can be applied to such cases as sublimation and dissociation of calcium carbonate and can predict whether a chemical reaction will proceed and whether it will be reversible.

At the Sorbonne, Matignon mostly worked on rare-earth elements. He was heating the metal oxide with magnesium to produce the pure metal in an atmosphere of a certain gas, and demonstrated that most rare earths easily react with nitrogen and absorb hydrogen. He also studied the chemistry of numerous rare-earth salts and revealed that samarium can have the valence of two in addition to the common 3+ state. For other metals, Matignon showed that technical-grade zinc, aluminium and ferromanganese powders always contain some nitrogen (e.g. 0.2–0.4% for zinc).

World War I urged most chemists to work on urgent technological problems, and Matignon had studied the water-sodium sulfate-ammonium system aiming for the production of sulfuric acid. He also worked on the stability of the ammonium carbonate-urea system, which was important for fertilizers, and discovered an iron-alumina catalyst for the synthesis of ammonia. By applying an oxidation reaction to a cargo of sugar spoiled by seawater he managed to convert it into oxalic acid. Matignon also tried to design recycling procedures for waste products of grape processing and brandy distillation.

== Major publications ==
- Camille Matignon, ... L'Électrométallurgie des fontes, fers et aciers. H. Dunod et E. Pinat. 1906.
- Nouveau cours de chimie élémentaire. Masson. 1914. (with multiple re-editions)
- Centenaire de Marcelin Berthelot: bio-bibliographie, fac-similés et portraits, discours et adresses à l'occasion du Centenaire, etc... Impr. Vaugirard. 1930.
