= Kamil Sindi =

Saudi businessman and politician (1932–2017)

- Born: 3 January 1932 (age 94); Makkah, Saudi Arabia

Kamil Sindi (January 3, 1932 – June 26, 2017) (Arabic: كامل عبد رب الرسول سندي) was the Director General of Saudi Arabian Airlines in 1967 and the Assistant Minister of Defense and Aviation in 1979.

== Biography ==
Kamil Sindi joined the civil aviation department, at Jeddah airport when he was only 17. He worked there until he became the assistant of General Ibrahim Al-Tasan, who was in charge of the Air Force, civil aviation and the airlines at that time.

He later was chosen to be the Director General of Saudi Arabian Airlines in 1967. During his days at the airline, he took it from a small company with a few DC-3s to an airline with a large fleet that included Boeing and Lockheed jets; and from an airline that had a few local destinations to an airline with large network of destinations in the Middle East, Africa, Europe and Asia. In 1979 he became the Assistant Minister of Defense and Aviation for Civil aviation.

He retired in 1983 due to health problems.

== Death ==
On June 26, 2017 Kamil Sindi died in Jeddah at the age of 84 and was buried in Al Ma'la cemetery in Mecca.
