= Camille Flers =

French painter

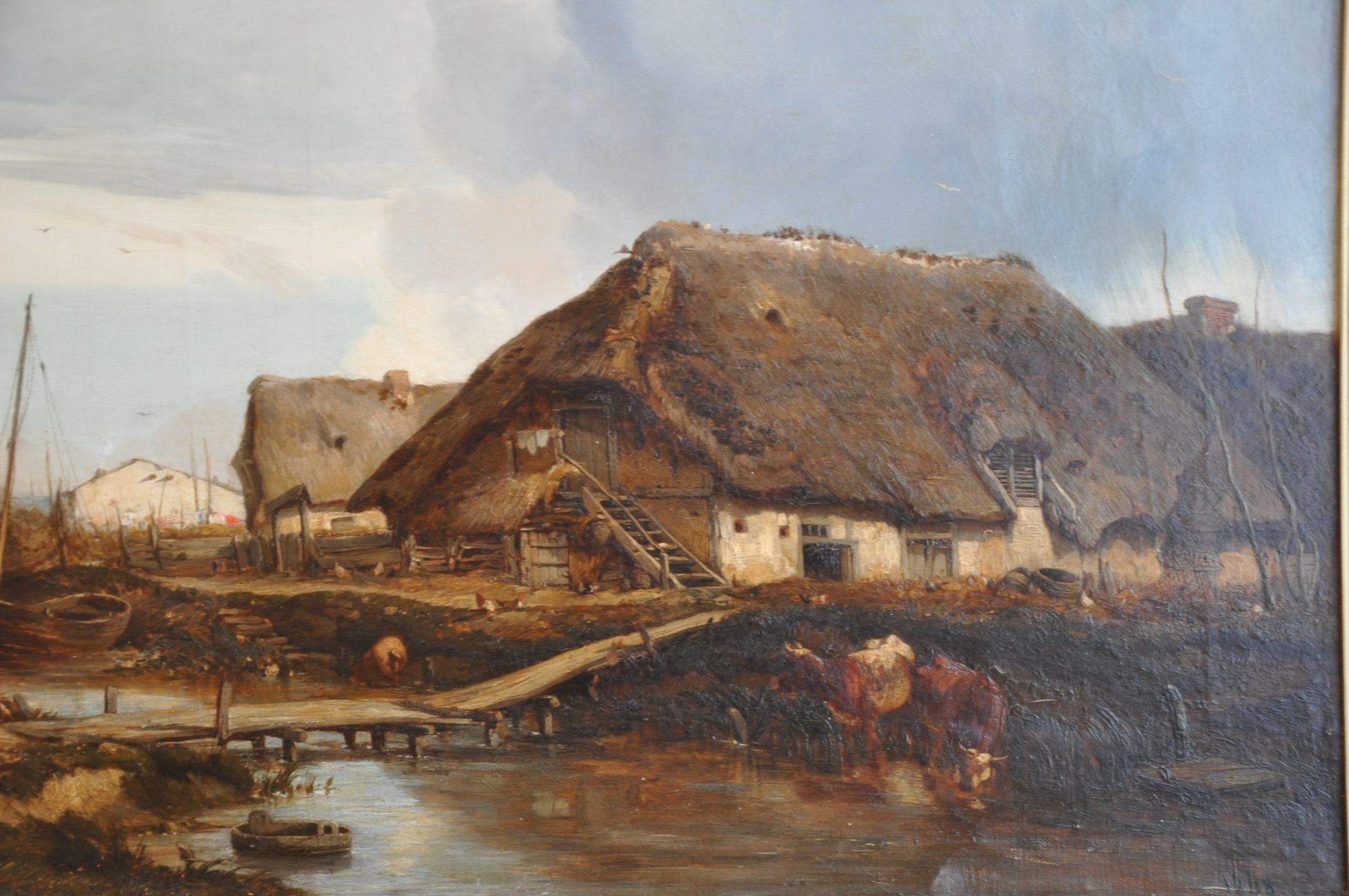
Fishermen's dwellings, 1848

Camille Flers (born in Paris in 1802) was a painter of landscapes and a scholar who studied Joseph François Pâris. His Views of Normandy and The Banks of the Marne and Eure display a great amount of study and power or feeling in the colouring. He died at Annet (Seine-et-Marne) Paris in 1868. He was the instructor of Cabats. In the Louvre is a landscape by this artist of the Environs of Paris.

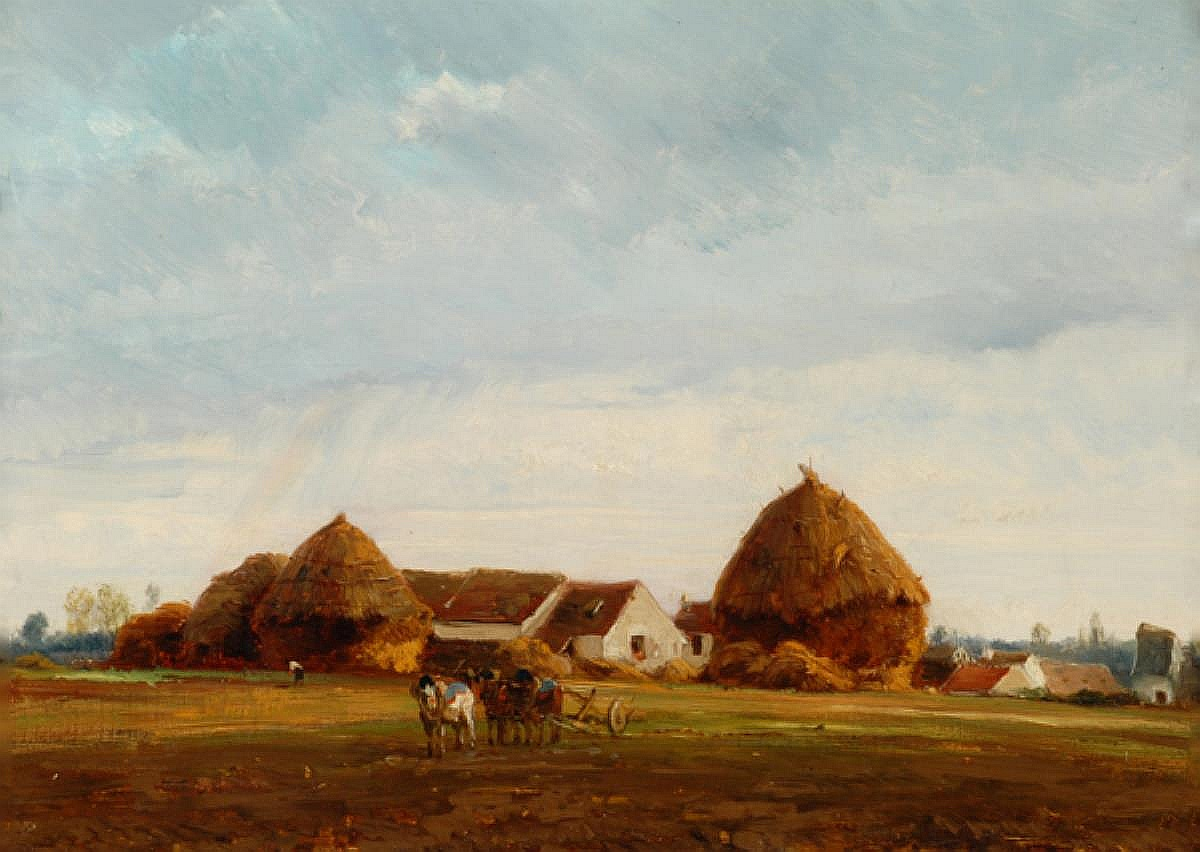
Landscape near Annet-sur-Marne

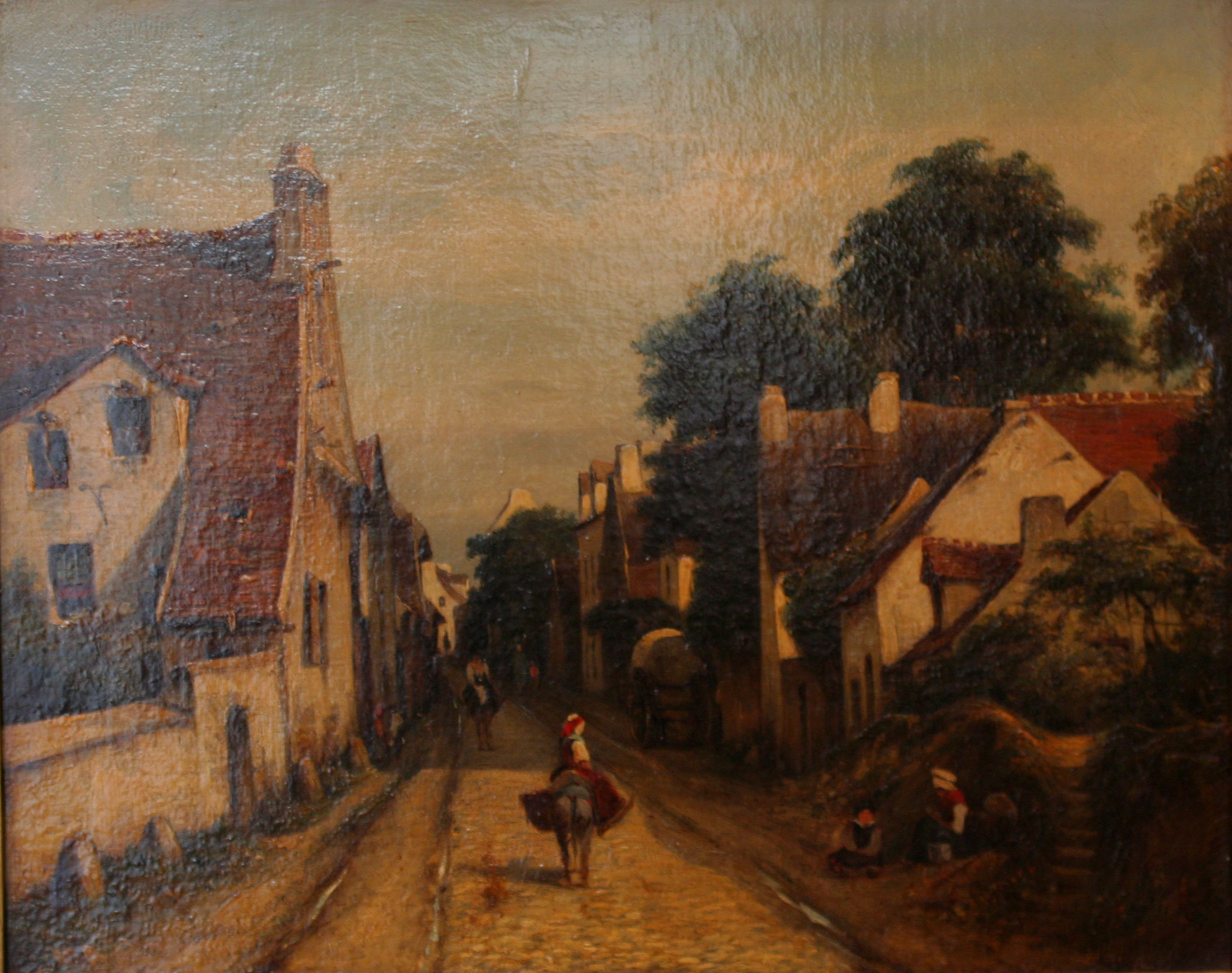
Normandy Road
