= Camille Norment =

Multimedia Artist

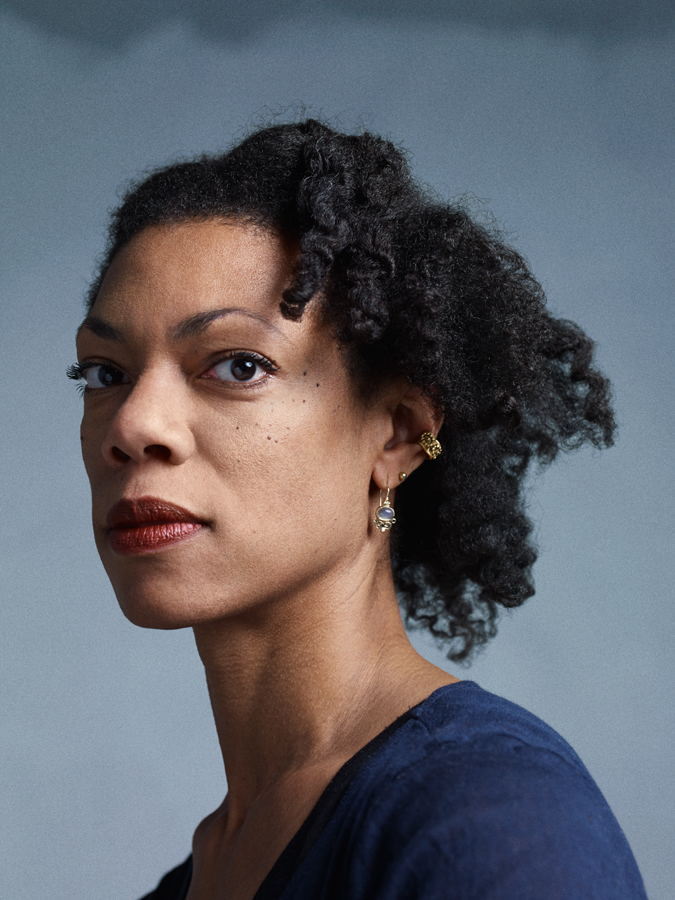
- Born: 1970 (age 55–56); Silver Spring, Maryland
- Education: New York University; University of Michigan
- Occupations: Artist, musician
- Years active: 1990s–present
- Website: norment.net

Camille Norment (born 1970) is an Oslo-based multimedia artist who works with sound, installation, sculpture, drawing, performance, and video. Norment also works as a musician and composer. She performs with Vegar Vårdal and Håvard Skaset in the Camille Norment Trio.

== Education and career ==
Camille Norment was born in Silver Spring, Maryland in 1970. She studied interactive technologies at New York University and literary science and history of art at the University of Michigan. In the late 1990s, Norment worked at Interval Research, a research and development technology laboratory co-founded by Paul Allen and David Liddle. There, she worked on haptically manipulating media, among other projects.

In 2015, the Office for Contemporary Art Norway (OCA) selected her to represent Norway in the Nordic Pavilion at the Venice Biennale, where she presented her work "Rapture".

Additionally, Norment has completed several commissioned works to public spaces, amongst others the sound installation "Within the Toll" (2011) for Henie Onstad Kunstsenter and her 2008 work "Triplight", which in 2013 was featured at the entrance of the MoMA exhibition "Soundings: A Contemporary Score."

In 2017 Camille Norment presented a solo exhibition at Oslo Kunstforening. This constituted her first solo presentation in Norway.

== Public art ==
- "Dead Room," 2000, The Project, New York.
- "Light Like Air," 2007, Vøyenenga Middle School Technical Center, Vøyenenga, Norway
- "The Moss Project," 2007, Moss, Norway
- "Trip Light," 2009, September Gallery, Berlin, Germany
- "Crystallin," 2010
- "Within the Toll," 2011, Henie Onstad Kunstsenter
- "Rhythm Wars - Interval," 2016, Løren train station, Oslo, Norway
- "Pulse - Formations," 2018, Thailand Biennial

== Musical work ==
Within the Camille Norment Trio, Norment notably plays the glass armonica, electric guitar, and the Hardanger fiddle. Her own armonica is composed of 24 glass bowls ranging two octaves. Norment has described the sound of the armonica as "...extremely visceral. It's a very pure crystalline sound."
