= Camille Seaman =

American photographer (born 1969)

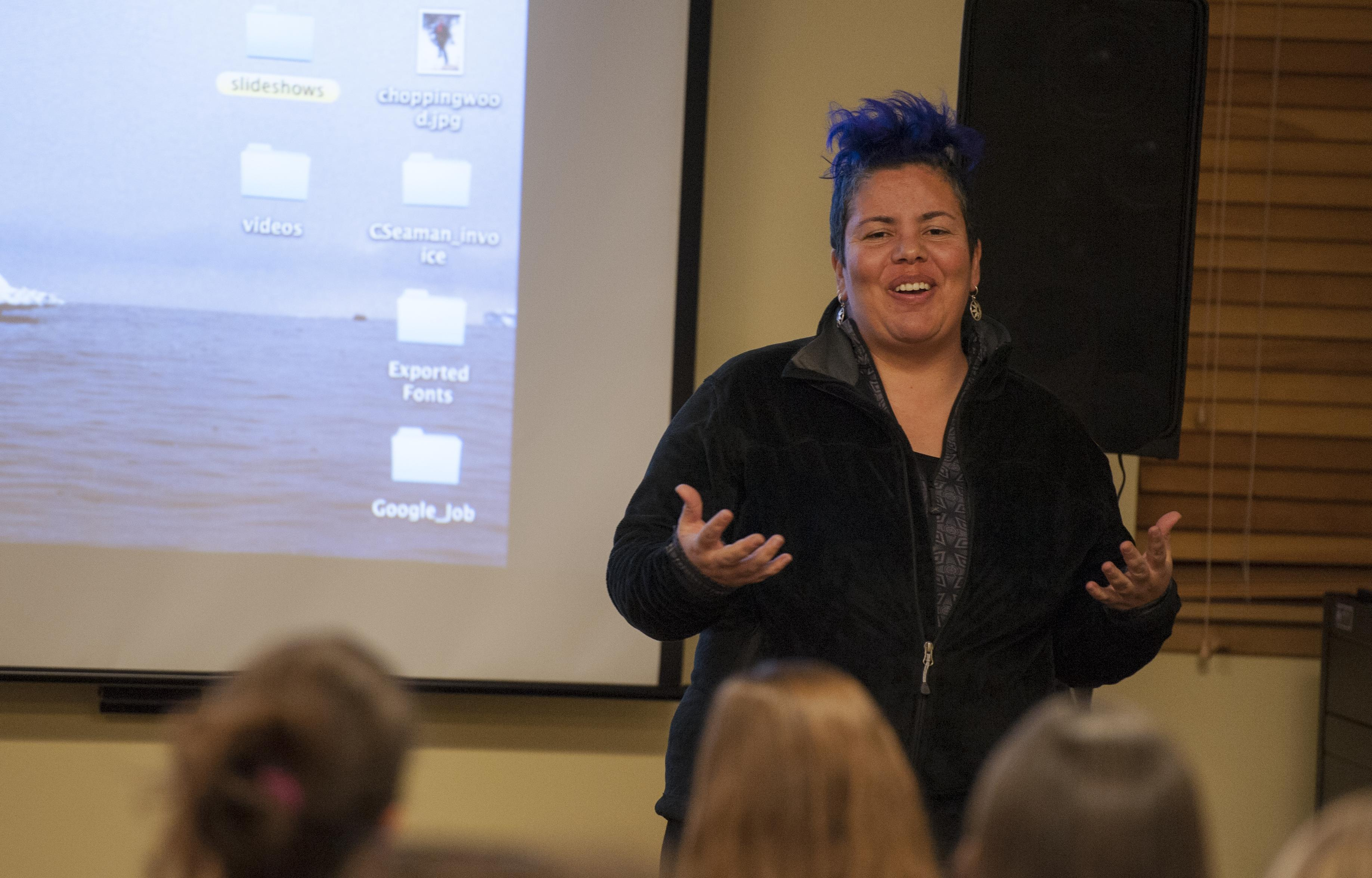
- Born: Camille Seaman; 1969 (age 56–57)
- Education: State University of New York
- Known for: Photography, Portraiture
- Movement: environmental art
- Awards: National Geographic Award
- Website: http://www.camilleseaman.com/

Camille Seaman (born 1969) is an American photographer who applies portraiture strategies to capture the changing natural environment. Her work mainly concerns the polar regions, where she captures the effects of climate change, thus merging the realms of science and art. She is of Native American and African-American descent through her father and mother respectively.

== Background ==
Camille Seaman was born to a Shinnecock father and African-American mother in 1969. She studied photography with Jan Groover at the State University of New York at Purchase, graduating in 1992.

== Work ==
Seaman reached wider attention with the production of her 2003 series of photographs of the Arctic Ocean island of Svalbard. Since then, her work has continued to engage with the effects of climate change through the depiction of icebergs, storms and other natural phenomena. Regarding a major exhibition mounted at the National Academy of Sciences, Ralph J. Cicerone noted that the Academy had two goals in mind, "to encourage wider appreciation of her artistry and to stimulate focused thought about the important roles that ice formations play in climatic change."

For her work merging science with art, Seaman was named a TED Senior Fellow and profiled in Wired and on The New York Times "Lens" photojournalism blog.

In 2014, Seaman received a John S. Knight Journalism Fellowship at Stanford University.

== Awards and recognition ==
In 2006, Seaman was granted a National Geographic Award, and in 2007 she was awarded a Critical Mass Top Monograph Award by the nonprofit organization Photolucida. Her work has been published in Newsweek, Time, The New York Times and Men's Journal.

In 2019, two of her photographs were added to the Native American Art Collection of the New York State Museum.

== Solo exhibitions ==
- 2008: The Last Iceberg, National Academy of Sciences
