= Scialo Bros. Bakery =

Bakery in Providence, Rhode Island, United States

Scialo Bros. Bakery, simply called Scialo’s, was a Federal Hill, Providence, Rhode Island bakery open from 1916 until owners Lois Scialo Ellis and Carol Scialo Gaeta closed it on March 14, 2020, at the onset of the COVID-19 pandemic. Their father Luigi and his brother Gaetano had opened the bakery. It was considered Federal Hill’s last authentic Italian bakery.

After Lois's passing in August 2020, the bakery was sold to an anonymous group of investors who bought the building, and abiding to agreements made at the time of purchase, opened again in May 2021 under the same name, using the same recipes and with Carol working at the bakery.

== Television ==
In 2012, Andrew Zimmern filmed an episode of Bizarre Foods America there. They also appeared on the Bobby Flay show Food Nation. They were recommended by Travel + Leisure.

== Honors and awards ==
Carol’s sister Lois Ellis was honored by the National Organization of Italian American Women in 2012.
