= Kamila Špráchalová =

Czech actress

- Born: 5 September 1971 (age 54); Prague, Czechoslovakia
- Occupation: Actress
- Years active: 1988–present
- Spouse: Jan Pecha
- Children: 2

Kamila Špráchalová (sometimes Kamila Špráchal) (born 5 September 1971, Prague) is a Czech stage and television actress. She provides the dubbed voiceover for Angela Watson from the Czech version of Step By Step, and also provides dubbed voiceovers for Jodie Foster and Nicole Kidman. She studied at the Prague Conservatory.

== Theatre ==
=== ABC Theatre ===
- Dobře rozehraná partie - New housekeeper
- Perfect Wedding - Julie
- České Vánoce - Manča
- U nás v Kocourkově - Lily
- Charley's Aunt - Kitty Verdun
- Le baruffe chiozzotte - Libera
- Arthurovo Bolero - Monika
- The Importance of Being Earnest - Cecilia
- Manon Lescaut

=== Other theaters ===
- Nora -> Divadlo Na Vinohradech (Vinohrady Theatre)
- Kdyby tisíc klarinetů (1991) -> from Conservatory
- Nuns -> musical

== Filmography ==
- Láska za milion (2009)
- Chlipník (2002) (TV)
- Nevěsta s velkýma nohama (2002) (TV)
- Ptačí král (1997) (TV)
- "Draculův švagr" (1996) TV series
- O třech stříbrných hřebenech (1991) (TV)
- Lhát se nemá, princezno (1991) (TV)
- Třináctery hodiny (1991) (TV)
- Černovláska (1988) (TV)
- Nanečisto (1988) (TV)

=== TV episodes ===
- "Drákulův švagr" (1996), playing Mr. Teacher's girlfriend in the episode, "Doktor Damián", 1996
- Melrose Place, dubbing voice of Jane Mancini

== Personal life ==
She is married with two sons, Kryštof and František Kvido.
