= Kamila Filipcikova =

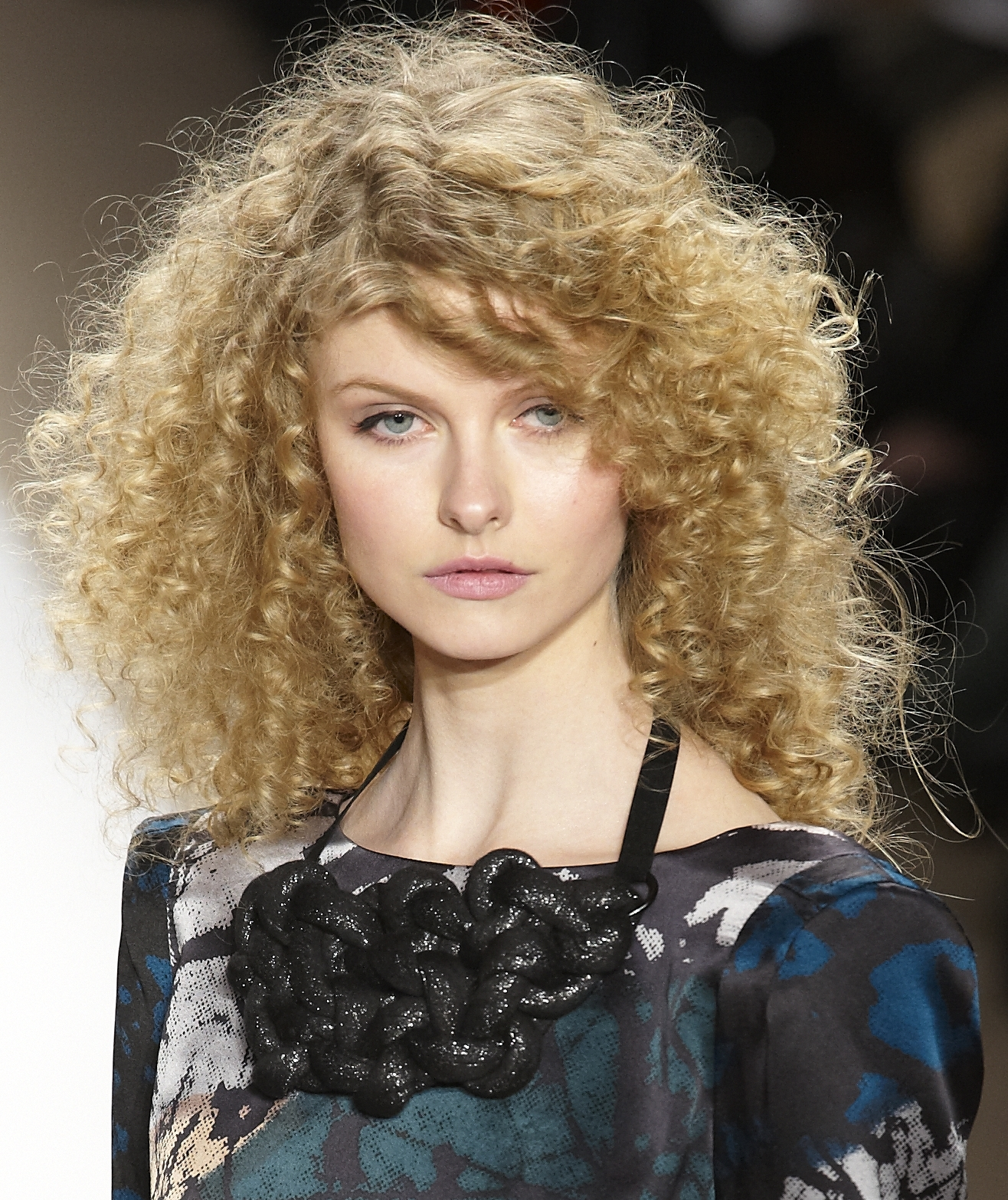
- Filipcikova walks for Tibi in 2010
- Born: August 12, 1991 (age 35); Bratislava, Czechoslovakia (now Slovakia)
- Occupation: Model
- Years active: 2005–present
- Modeling information
- Height: 5 ft 10 in / 178 cm
- Hair color: Blonde
- Eye color: Blue / Grey

Kamila Filipcikova (born 12 August 1991) is a female Slovak fashion model. She has modeled in fashion shows for designers such as Marc Jacobs, Chanel, Givenchy, Dolce & Gabbana, and Sonia Rykiel. And appeared on the cover of Vogue Italia two times in a row.

== Modelling career ==
Filipcikova was discovered in 2005, at the age of 14, in Bratislava, Slovakia. Russell Marsh chose her as a rising star in 2007.

In 2008 she was photographed many times by photographer Steven Meisel, and she appeared on the cover of Vogue Italia (February and March editions), with spreads in both editions. She was included in the advertising campaign for Alberta Ferretti.

In 2009 she scored the Marc Jacobs F/W campaign, photographed by Juergen Teller. She also appeared in spreads for i-D and V Magazine. Still in 2009, Filipcikova appeared two times in Vogue Paris, photographed by David Sims and Inez van Lamsweerde and Vinoodh Matadin.

In 2010, Filipcikova appeared in editorials for the January issue of Vogue Nippon and Vogue Italia, photographed by Steven Meisel. She appeared in W Magazine three times: in January, May and June. She also appeared in LOVE Magazine.

In 2011, Filipcikova appeared in Italian Amica Magazine two times, including on the cover in the June issue. She also appeared on the cover of Rodeo Magazine, and did editorials for Danish Cover Magazine and Czech Dolce Vita magazine.
