= Camille Mansour =

Palestinian academic (born 1945)

- كاميل منصور
- Born: 1945 (age 80–81); Haifa, Mandatory Palestine
- Occupation: Academic
- Years active: 1970s–present
- Title: Professor

Academic background
- Education: American University of Beirut; Paris-Sorbonne University

Academic work
- Discipline: Political science
- Institutions: University of Paris; Birzeit University

Camille Mansour (Arabic: كاميل منصور; born 1945) is a Palestinian academic. In addition to his teaching post at different universities he has worked at the Institute for Palestine Studies (IPS), Beirut, Lebanon, in various capacities, including the secretary-general of its board of trustees.

== Early life and education ==
Mansour was born in Haifa, Mandatory Palestine, in 1945. He graduated from the American University of Beirut. He obtained his Ph.D. in political science and Islamic from the Paris-Sorbonne University.

== Career and activities ==
Mansour served as the editor in chief of The Yearbook of Palestine and the Arab-Israeli Conflict for the IPS in Beirut. He worked at Harvard University as a visiting scholar from 1979 to 1980. He was named as the chair of the IPS's research department in 1980 and remained in office until 1984. He became a professor of international relations and Middle Eastern politics at the University of Paris in 1984 which he left in 2004. He was named as the advisor to the Palestinian negotiation team for the Madrid conference in 1991 and for the Washington conference. His term as legal advisor ended in February 1994. He was tasked to establish the law center of Birzeit University, West Bank, in 1994 and then became its head which he held until 2000. Yasser Arafat, leader of the Palestine Authority, assigned him to a constitutional committee in February 1996.

Mansour is the founder of Al Muqtafi, the Palestine Judicial and Legislative Databank. He served as the dean of its Faculty of Law and Public Administration from 2007 and 2009. He also worked as a senior advisor of the United Nations Development Program for the Palestinian Rule of Law and Judiciary, Jerusalem, between 2004 and 2006.

Later Mansour was named as the secretary-general of IPS's board of trustees, and member of Birzeit University's board of trustees. He is the editor-in-chief of the Interactive Encyclopedia of the Palestine Question.

== Work ==
Mansour has authored many articles and books, including Les Palestiniens de l’intérieur, Beyond Alliance: Israel in U.S. Foreign Policy ISBN 9780231084925, and The Palestinian-Israeli Negotiations: An Overview and Assessment, October 1991–January 1993. He also coedited various books such as Transformed Landscapes: Essays on Palestine and the Middle East in Honor of Walid Khalidi ISBN 978-9774162473.

=== Views ===
Mansour states that Israel have transformed Palestinians into targets through a detailed system of monitoring which he calls "besieging cartography". This system consists of many tools, including "passive sensors, observation towers equipped with day/night and radar surveillance capabilities, satellite images and photographs from reconnaissance planes and electronic data banks for analysis."

In his book entitled Beyond Alliance: Israel in U.S. Foreign Policy Mansour argues that the total support of the US to Israeli policies has a psychological dimension in addition to political, economic and strategic dimensions. He adds that this support is, in fact, a burden to the American government and is not a product of the extensive Jewish lobby in the US, but of the positive approach of the Americans towards Israelis. For him, Americans have a negative view about Palestinians.
