= Old Canteen =

Italian restaurant in Providence, Rhode Island

Coordinates: 41.82312°N 71.42196°W

The Old Canteen was an Italian restaurant in Federal Hill, Providence, Rhode Island. The original, The Old Canteen was opened in the 1930's by Olindo Cipolla and later acquired by Joe Marzilli in 1956. They were Rhode Island’s oldest family owned restaurant and noted for their famous guests, particularly Mayor Buddy Cianci (when he died in 2016, they left his regular table empty in his honor) who has brought Frank Sinatra with him to dine.

Raymond L. S. Patriarca, boss of the Patriarca crime family, was a regular that held "top-level meetings" there according to his FBI files.

Patriarca would use the apartment above the restaurant to host card games "when there was something private going on".

In 2022, owner and head chef Joe Marzilli wanted to retire and was putting the restaurant up for sale after more than 65 years.

== Legacy ==
Food & Wine named it "one of the 50 Best Classic Restaurants in the United States".

The Old Canteen was compared to NYC's Sardi's as a place "to see and be seen".
