= Kamila Nasr =

Canadian musical artist

- Origin: Canada
- Occupation(s): Singer, composer

Kamila Nasr is a Canadian singer, composer and multi-instrumentalist based in Montreal, Quebec. She is the feature subject of director Terry Stone's 2007 film Virtuoso, a Canadian documentary on the Theremin. In September 2012, she released her solo album Paint the Moon under her stage name Kamila and as an independent label.

== Career ==
From 2007 to 2012 Nasr performed as the lead singer for the 15-piece Beijing-based Samba band, Sambasia. Nasr and Sambasia performed at the Evening of the Era concert alongside renowned Chinese rock musician Cui Jian at the Worker's Stadium in Beijing in January 2008, In 2008 she founded the bossa nova quartet Girassol, and performed at venues in China, including Mao Live and OT Lounge as well as the Brazilian, Chilean and French embassies.

Nasr recorded and produced Chasing Fireflies, a full-length album of original folk music with musician Sahara Jane in 2003. The album was nominated for four Music Industry Association of Newfoundland (MIANL) awards. From the late 1990s to early 2000s Nasr and Sahara Jane performed at folk festivals and music events in Canada including the Winnipeg Folk Festival, The Vancouver Island Music Festival, Deep Roots Music Festival, Trout Forest Music Festival and the Thundering Women Festival.

Nasr has regularly performed on stage in China with guitarist Pierre Brahin, with their shows described as a mix of "Brazilian favorites, standard bossa, choro and samba, flamenco guitar, fado and finally Iranian and Afghan popular and folk songs accompanied by Flamenco rhythms" by TimeOut Beijing.

In 2016, Nasr formed world music quartet ASHK with longtime collaborators Sahara Nasr, Ariana Nasr and Ken Shorley. ASHK is a long-term vehicle for Nasr to extend her repertoire beyond solo and accompanying performances and to perform music outside of folk and jazz, including multi-language compositions. As well as performing in local venues in her home province of Nova Scotia, Canada, Nasr has performed with ASHK at Sunfest in London, Ontario and Mosaic Multicultural Festival in Moncton, New Brunswick, the group's first international venues.

== Track listing ==
Paint the Moon
No.	Title	Length
1.	"A Simple Song"	2:41
2.	"Dança Da Solidão"	4:07
3.	"Paint the Moon"	3:03
4.	"A Encontros E Despedidas"	3:55
5.	"Deixa"	4:11
6.	"Manhã De Carnaval"	4:00
7.	"Lullaby"	4:09
8.	"Minha Alma"	2:54
9.	"Medo Feroz"	3:51
10.	"Chasing Fireflies"	3:16
11.	"Night Sky"	3:44
