= Camille Babut du Marès =

Belgian musician

Camille Babut du Marès is a Belgian violinist.

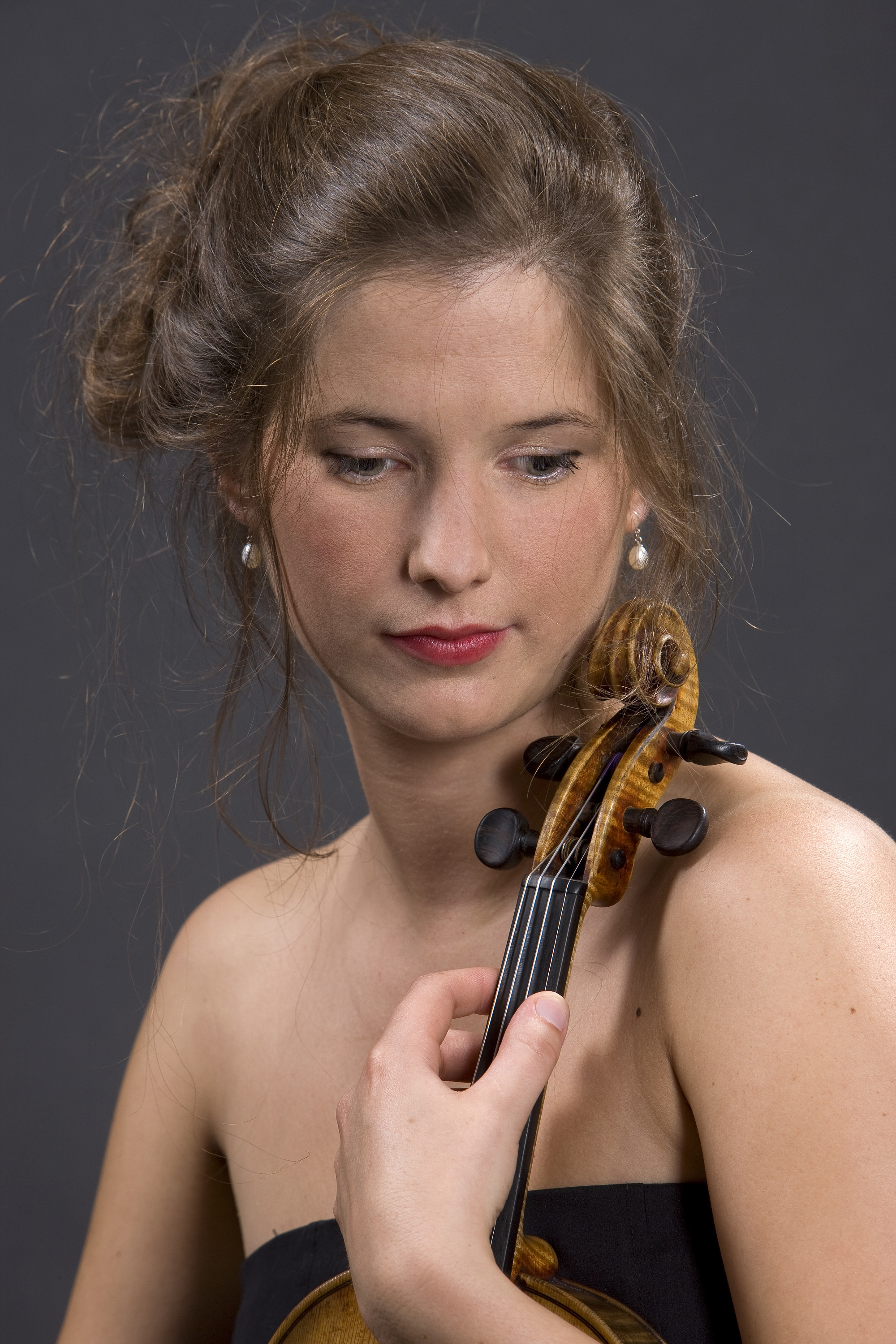
Camille Babut du Marès

== Biography ==
In her native Belgium, Camille was a finalist and prize-winner in several competitions for young musicians, including the “Jeunes Solistes RTBF” and the “Jong Tenuto BRT” competitions. In the Netherlands, Camille was a prize-winner at the SONBU competition, as a member of a piano trio, and she also won the Public Prize at the Maastricht Music Award competition in 2006.

She has given numerous solo concerts and recitals in Japan, Spain, Romania, France, Portugal, Italy, the UK, Germany, Luxembourg, the Netherlands and of course in Belgium, where she has performed at venues including the Brussels Palais des Beaux-Arts, Flagey and the Royal Conservatory of Brussels, and as a soloist with the Liège Symphony Orchestra and the Brussels Philharmonic Orchestra.

Camille worked with other world famous violinists such as Mihaela Martin, Itzhak Rashkovsky, Zakhar Bron, Boris Kuschnir, Pierre Amoyal, Raphaël Oleg, Gérard Poulet, Philippe Graffin, David Grimal, Renaud Capuçon, Miriam Fried, Suzanne Gessner, Boris Belkin, Felix Andrievsky, Mikhail Kopelman, Liviu Prunaru, Yuri Zhislin, Leonid Kerbel and Roman Nodel.

In October 2011, Camille won a first prize at the Osaka International Music Competition in Japan.

She is the founder of the Cosmopolitan Duo (with the pianist Maiko Inoue; they organised a tour in 2015) and the Amethyst Trio (with the viola player Clément Holvoet and the cellist Kacper Nowak).

A committed musician, Camille is the artistic director of the festival Les Musicales de la Woluwe. Recently she played alongside Gérard Caussé, David Cohen, Jean-Claude Vanden Eynden, Pascal Moraguès, Justus Grimm, ...

== Studies ==
Camille Babut du Marès started her studies at the Royal Conservatory of Brussels only at thirteen (graduated in 2002), and she won First prize in Solfege (2001) and an Outstanding First Prize in violin (June 2002) in the class of Véronique Bogaerts. Camille continued her studies at the Koninklijke Conservatorium van Brussel, in the class of Yuzuko Horigome, and two years later she entered the class of world-acclaimed professor and soloist Boris Belkin at the Maastricht Conservatory, graduating with a bachelor's degree. She then went on to obtain a Postgraduate Diploma in Performance from the Royal College of Music, where she studied with Yuri Zhislin. In 2012, Camille finished her studies at the Hochschule für Musik und Tanz Köln, in the class of Michaël Vaiman.
