= Camille de Morel =

French poet and writer

Camille de Morel (1547–1611) was a 16th-century French poet and writer.

== Early life ==
Morel was born in Paris in 1547. Although the exact date is not known, she was baptized on September 18, 1547. Her baptism was at the church of Saint-André-des-Arts. Morel's father was Jean de Morel, and her mother was Antoinette de Loynes. Jean de Morel was the Sieur de Grigny making him a lower aristocrat, and he travelled around, settling in Paris where he held important positions in the household of Henry II and Catherine de Medicis.

She grew up with her two younger sisters, Lucrèce and Diane, and brother Issac. Isaac was kidnapped and taken to Scotland. Camille was instructed by her mother Antoinette in Latin and Ancient Greek from an early age. By age ten, her parents had hired the humanist Charles Utenhove to tutor the four Morel children.

During her studies, Morel focused on Latin, Greek, and Hebrew, and she began to write poetry. Her mother held a salon in their home that was often visited by humanists, writers, and poets, who often read Camille's writings. Her mother's salon was often referred to as a "temple des muses". Contemporary intellectuals frequented the Morel family's salon, including Pierre de Ronsard, Joachim du Bellay, Michel de L'Hospital, Salmon Macrin, Nicolas Bourbon, Charles and Scévole de Sainte-Marthe, Nicolas Denisot, and Jean Dorat.

Camille was courted by a fellow poet, Jean Melissus. They did not marry.

== Religion ==
Morel was born and baptized into the Roman Catholic church and converted to the Reformed religion later in life. Father de Coste spoke of her in one of his books by saying, "I would have praised her in this book if this young lady had not died outside the true Church."

== Writings ==
From youth, Camille was frequently praised by her contemporaries, including Elizabeth I. Her writing style was often compared to the composition of Latin verses by male poets of her time despite the constraints women writers were subjected to. The comparisons often were used to explain and justify the fact that she was a woman, rather than to praise her. Jean Dorat noted this as he described Morel as being neither male nor female and belonging to a "third sex" in his Latin ode to her. Joachim Du Bellay writes of Camille in a 1558 Latin epigram:

Camille plays so well with Latin measures, that you would think Camille was brought up in Latium. Camille speaks Greek so well that you would swear that Athens is less Attic. Camille also forms her Hebrew letters as well as the Romans did theirs. Camille composes in French so well that Ronsard himself might be envious.

Many praised Morel for her intellect compared to other females of her time. Her writing style was direct, as well as the emotions she portrayed in her writings. She did not leave much up to interpretation.

Having Utenhove as her tutor gave Morel a reputable base as she left the humanist circles and moved to central Paris. Camille only published one of her works during her lifetime. It was a collection of poetry in honor of the passing of her father Jean who died in 1581. The Tumulus was printed by Frédéric de Morel in 1583.

The Tumulus is a collection of poems, twelve of which were written by Camille herself. Some poems honor her mother, who had died in 1567; others commemorate her two sisters Diane (d. 1567) and Lucrèce who predeceased Camille and Jean de Morel. Camille's poems were written in Latin, ancient Greek, and French. Jean Dorat contributed to the Tumulus. Camille addressed poems to Ronsard, Scévole de Sainte-Marthe, and Utenhove, in which she criticized their refusal to supply poems for the volume in honor of her father, their friend. Camille de Morel's reputation and popularity seem to have faded after this publication and details about her later life are scarce.

== Death ==
Not much is known about the death of Morel. There is no official date nor official cause of death. It is however known that her sisters, Lucrèce and Diane, who were close to her in age, died in 1580 and 1581, respectively. Some of her last writing dates to the early 1600s, specifically 1611; therefore, it is widely accepted she died that year.

== Sources ==
- Camille de Morel – SiefarWikiEn
- Will, Samuel F. (1936). "Camille de Morel: A Prodigy of the Renaissance". PMLA. 51 (1): 83–119. doi:10.2307/458316. JSTOR 458316.
- "7. The Morel Salon: A Microcosm of the Res publica litterarum". The Judgment of Palaemon. 2013. pp. 203–225. doi:10.1163/9789004245402_008. ISBN 9789004245396.
- Loynes, Antoinette de (fl. 16th c.) | Encyclopedia.com
- The salons
- Women's Involvement in the French Salons (Early 18th Century) – ILS202_fall11
- The Center of Cultural Innovation: Parisian Salons
- Family tree of Diane de MOREL
- Campbell, Julie D.; Larsen, Anne R. (2009). Early Modern Women and Transnational Communities of Letters. ISBN 978-0-7546-6738-4.
- Stevenson, Jane (2005). "Women and Latin in Renaissance France". Women Latin Poets. pp. 177–198. doi:10.1093/acprof:oso/9780198185024.003.0009. ISBN 978-0-19-818502-4.
- Ford, Philip (2004). "An Early French Renaissance Salon: The Morel Household". Renaissance and Reformation / Renaissance et Réforme. 28 (1): 9–20. doi:10.33137/rr.v40i1.8942. JSTOR 43445721.
