= Camille Ralphs =

English poet

- Born: Camille Llawella Ralphs; 1992 (age 33–34); Stoke-on-Trent, England
- Education: Lancaster University; Darwin College, Cambridge; Keble College, Oxford
- Years active: 2015–present

Camille Llawella Ralphs (born 1992) is an English poet, critic and editor. Her debut poetry collection After You Were, I Am was published by Faber & Faber in 2024 to critical acclaim. She is the first woman to serve as poetry editor at The Times Literary Supplement.

== Early life and education ==
Ralphs was born in Stoke-on-Trent. She graduated with a Bachelor of Arts (BA) in English Literature with Creative Writing from Lancaster. She went on to pursue further studies in Theology at Darwin College, Cambridge, before completing an MSt at Keble College, Oxford. During her time at the latter, she was president of the Oxford University Poetry Society.

== Career ==
Ralphs' first collection of poems After You Were, I Am was a book of the year in The Telegraph and The Guardian, and was widely reviewed elsewhere. In the London Review of Books, Ange Mlinko wrote that "Ralphs's talent for subsuming her ego in her subjects may have something to do with her Catholic upbringing, her theological studies or pure instinct. Whichever it is, it gives her a gravitas few think to look for anymore." The US edition of After You Were, I Am was published by McSweeney's in September 2025, and was named a book of the year by Artforum and longlisted for the National Book Critics Circle Award.

Ralphs' poems have appeared in magazines and periodicals including ArtReview, The New York Review of Books, and The Poetry Review, and she has written essays and reviews for venues including the Los Angeles Review of Books, Poetry, and Poetry London.

Since 2020, Ralphs has been poetry editor at The Times Literary Supplement. She is the first woman to hold this role.

== Works ==
=== Poetry ===
- Malkin: An elegy in 14 spels (The Emma Press, 2015) ISBN 978-1-910139-30-1
- uplifts & chains (If A Leaf Falls Press, 2020)
- Daydream College for Bards (Guillemot Press, 2023) ISBN 978-1-913749-43-9
- After You Were, I Am (UK: Faber & Faber, 2024; US: McSweeney's, 2025) ISBN 978-0571384853; ISBN 978-1963270297
