= Newport Creamery =

Restaurant chain in Rhode Island and Massachusetts

Coordinates: 41°30′40.5″N 71°18′10.2″W

- Industry: Food
- Founded: 1940; 86 years ago
- Founder: Samuel Rector
- Headquarters: Middletown, Rhode Island
- Number of locations: 8
- Area served: Rhode Island; Massachusetts
- Key people: Mark Bogosian
- Products: Ice Cream; Milkshake
- Website: www.newportcreamery.com

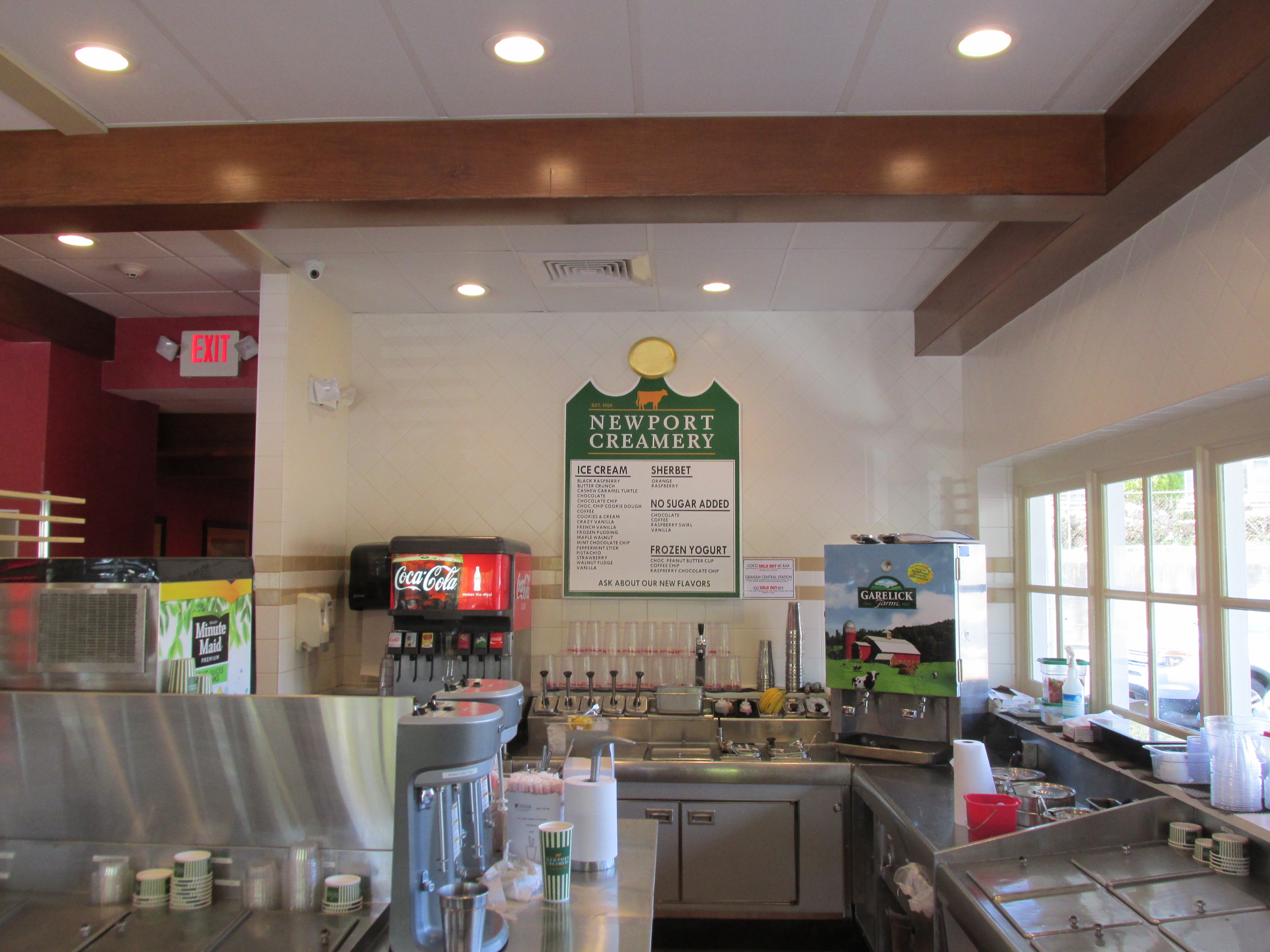
Inside the now closed Newport Creamery in in Barrington, Rhode Island

Newport Creamery is a chain of restaurants in Rhode Island and southern Massachusetts. Since its first restaurant opened in 1940, it has been primarily known for ice cream and, later, the "Awful Awful" milkshake. The company is based in Middletown, Rhode Island.

== History ==
Newport Creamery began with Samuel Rector's Newport, Rhode Island dairy business in 1928. Rector began as a wholesaler and started home delivery in 1932. In 1940, Rector and his son opened their first restaurant in nearby Middletown, where the company is still headquartered. For its first 13 years, the restaurant sold only ice cream, adding other food to the menu in 1953. In the 1950s and 1960s, it was franchised, eventually expanding to 33 restaurants.

In the late 1990s, the company ran into financial trouble, losing money, deferring maintenance, and closing 12 of its locations. In 1999, the Rector family sold the chain to Florida businessman, Robert Swain, for $7.6 million. Swain tried to expand the business's geographic coverage into Massachusetts and Connecticut. The expansion was unsuccessful, and was followed by contraction. The company filed for bankruptcy protection in 2001. In 2001, Jan Companies, a local Burger King franchisee, purchased the company for only $1.55 million.

As of 2026, the company has 8 locations; six are located in Rhode Island, and two are in southeastern Massachusetts.

== Awful Awful ==
The chain is known for Awful Awful milkshakes, made from proprietary ice milk and blended syrups that come in a variety of different flavors. The drink started at the New Jersey–based chain, Bond's, in the 1940s. The name comes from a Bond's customer who called it "awful big and awful good". In 1948, Bond's licensed it to Newport Creamery and then to Massachusetts-based Friendly's. The terms of the license mandated the two New England businesses not sell it in New Jersey, leading the expanding Friendly's chain to rebrand it as a "Fribble", and later changing its formula to be more like a traditional milkshake with ice cream instead of ice milk. When Bond's went out of business in the 1970s, Newport Creamery purchased the trademark and continues to serve the original recipe.

== Locations ==
Massachusetts

- Fall River, MA- 1670 President Ave
- Seekonk, MA- 701 Fall River Ave

Rhode Island

- Coventry, RI- 781 Tiogue Avenue
- Greenville, RI- 568 Putnam Pike
- Middletown, RI- 208 West Main Road
- North Kingstown, RI- 7679 Post Road
- Providence, RI- 673 Smith Street
- Warwick, RI- 1256 Warwick Avenue

Closed in 2020s

- Barrington, RI- 296 County Road (closed January 25th, 2026)
- Cranston, RI- 100 Hillside Rd (closed December 28, 2025)
