= Kamil Ozerk =

Norwegian-Turkish Cypriot academic

Kamil Ozerk (Norwegian: Kamil Øzerk, Turkish: Kamil Özerk; born in Cyprus) is a Norwegian-Turkish Cypriot educator and professor of pedagogy at the University of Oslo.

== Personal life ==
He is married to Meral R. Ozerk who is a senior advisor at Statped, specializing in children with learning disabilities. Together with his wife, they have written children's books in the field of education, bilingualism and autism.
