= Camille's (Providence, Rhode Island) =

Italian restaurant in Providence Rhode Island

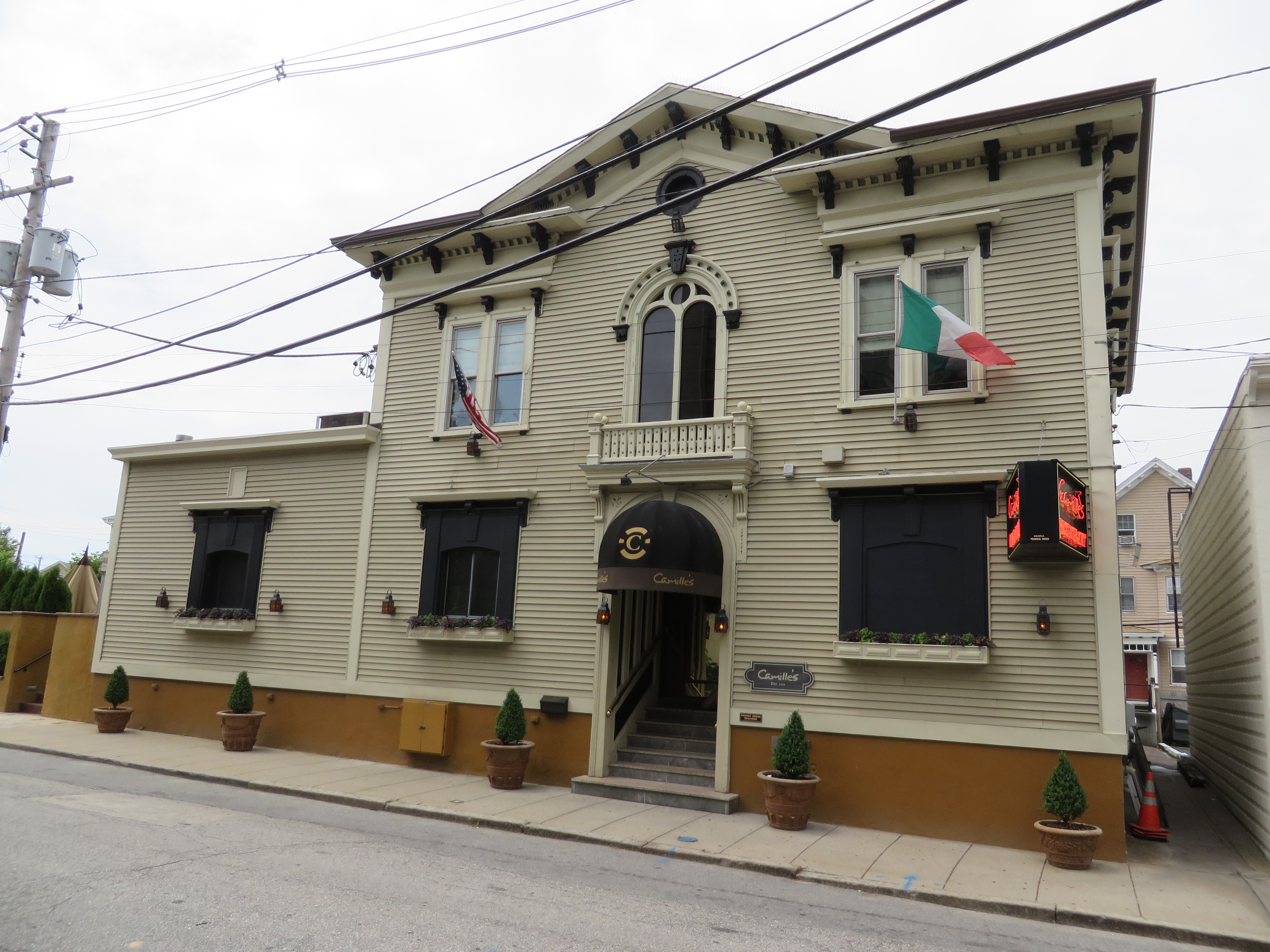
- Camille's restaurant
- Interactive map of Camille's

Restaurant information
- Previous owner: Pasquale Parolisi
- Food type: Italian
- Location: 71 Bradford St, Providence, Providence County, Rhode Island, 02903, US
- Coordinates: 41.822778°N 71.421667°W
- Website: Camille's website

Camille's is the oldest Italian restaurant in Rhode Island, located in Federal Hill, Providence, Rhode Island. Camille's has been open since 1914 when it was known as Marconi’s.

They are known as the best Mafia restaurant in America.

== History ==
In 1914 Camille's opened for business under the name Marconi's. In 1919 The restaurant changed ownership, name and location when Pasquale Parolisi bought the restaurant. In 1952, Jack and Camille, his son and daughter-in-law, inherited the restaurant. Camille's is the second oldest family owned restaurant in the US.

The restaurant is housed in what was a former mansion. Camille's may have been the first restaurant to feature fried calamari.

== Reception ==
Camille's was honored with an Award of Excellence from Wine Spectator.

The Phoenix said “Camille's exudes duende, the rare place that's pure Rhode Island with a dash of Las Vegas, the kind of joint where Frank Sinatra would have felt right at home.”

In fact, Sinatra was supposedly a big fan of their Italian wedding soup. Other famous customers include several US Presidents including John F. Kennedy and his son, Lyndon B. Johnson, Jimmy Carter and Gerald Ford; Jane Fonda, Yoko Ono as well as members of Aerosmith and Led Zeppelin.

Mafia boss Raymond L. S. Patriarca was a frequent customer.
