= Tempera =

Fast-drying painting medium

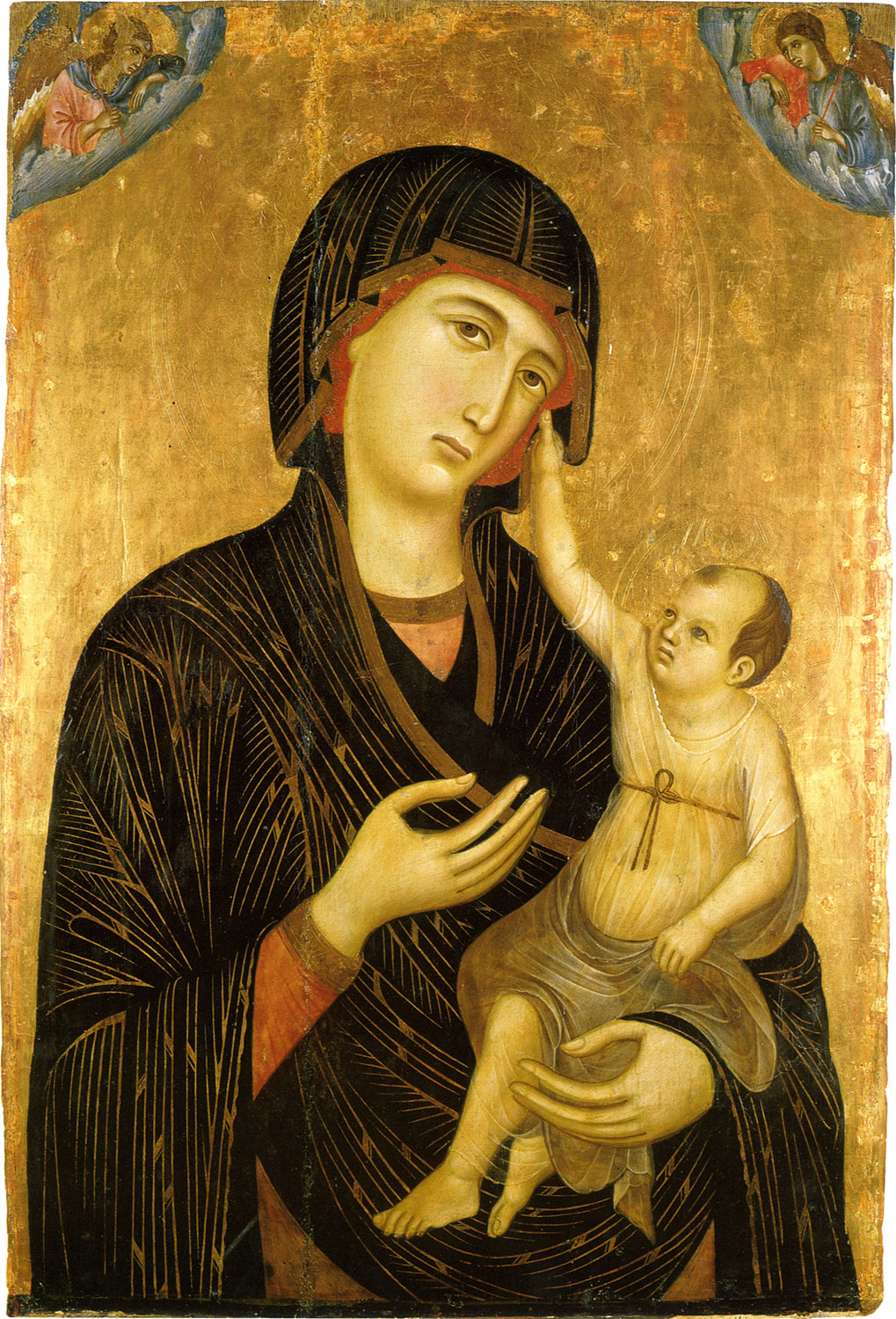
Crevole Madonna by Duccio, tempera with gold ground on wood, 1284, Siena

Tempera (Italian: [ˈtɛmpera]) is a permanent, fast-drying painting medium consisting of pigments mixed with a water-soluble binder medium, usually glutinous material such as egg yolk. Several types of tempera paint exist, but the type containing egg yolk is called egg tempera. Tempera paint made from milk protein is called casein paint. If the binder is synthetic PVA, the result is polyvinyl acetate tempera. A distemper paint consisting of pigment and binders such as cornstarch, gum arabic and other gums is called poster paint in certain parts of the world, and it is also often confusingly referred to as "tempera paint", although the binders in this paint are different from traditional egg tempera paints and the visual effect is more like gouache.

The term tempera also refers to the paintings done in any of these tempera mediums.

== Etymology ==
The term tempera is derived from the Italian dipingere a tempera ("paint in distemper"), from the Late Latin distemperare ("mix thoroughly").

== History ==
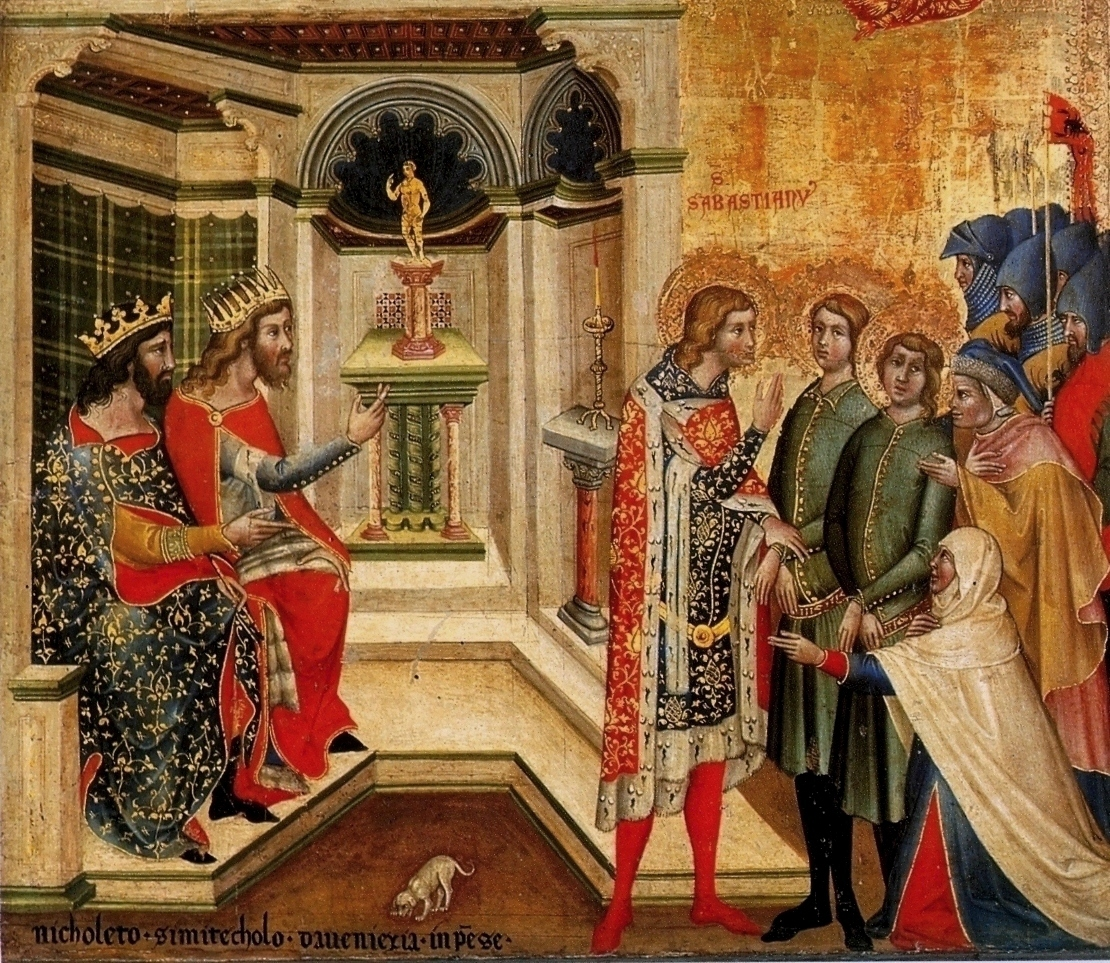
A 1367 tempera on wood by Niccolò Semitecolo

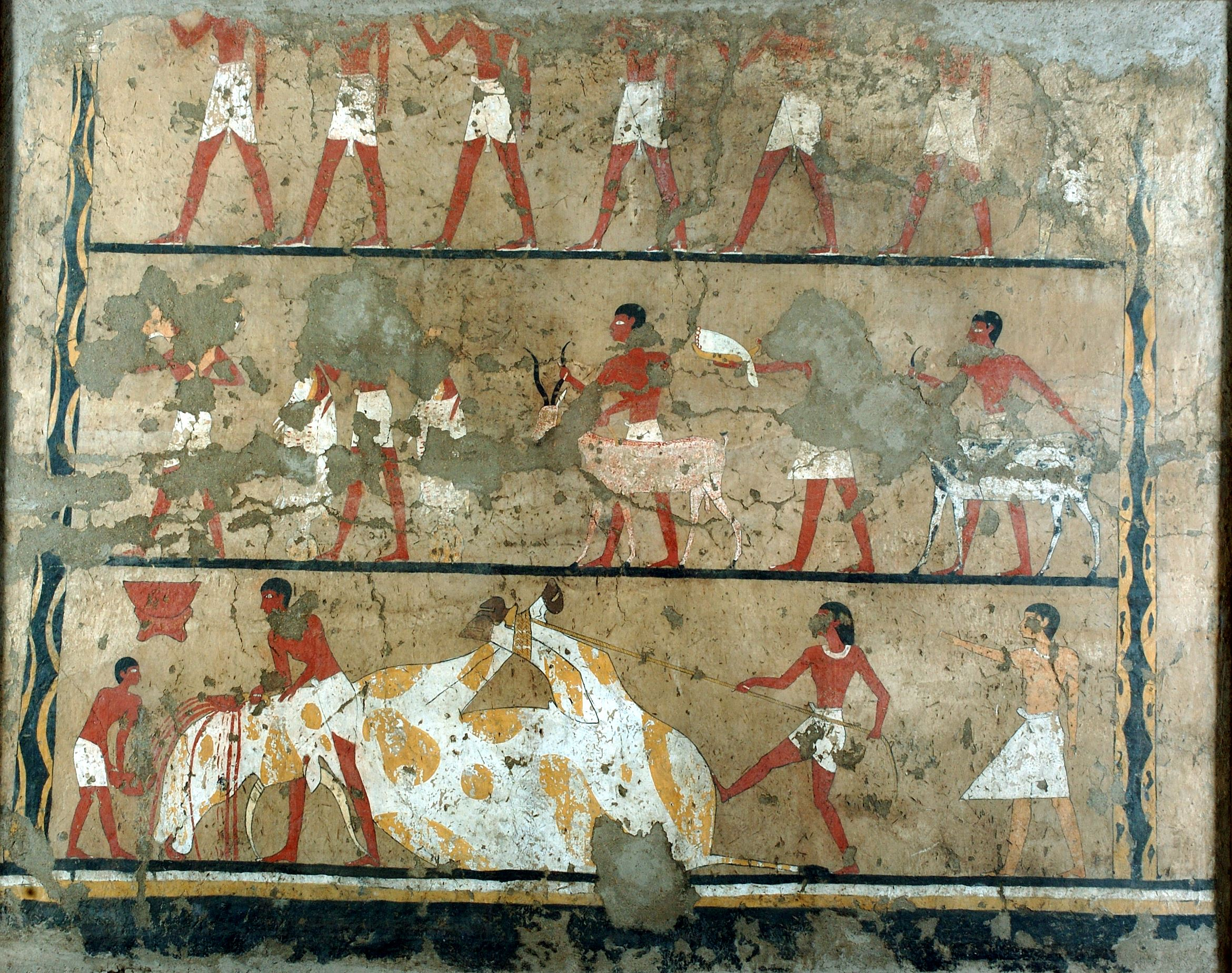
Ancient Egyptian wall painting with tempera on intonaco made with clay and straw, representing offering bearers and a sacrifice scene. From the Tomb of Iti and Neferu, Gebelein, between 2118 and 1980 BC (First Intermediate Period of Egypt). Museo Egizio, Turin (S. 14354/12).

The earliest known examples of egg tempera are the prehistoric murals on the Domus de Janas chamber tombs in Sardinia, dating back to 3400-2700 BCE. Analysed samples dated to 1200 BCE also detected egg tempera in the murals of the Palace of Nestor in Pylos.

It is frequently claimed that egg tempera painting has been found on early Egyptian sarcophagus decorations. Some Fayum mummy portraits also seem to have been done in tempera, sometimes in combination with encaustic painting made with melted wax, an alternative painting technique in the ancient world. However, recent scientific analysis has shown that animal glue was preferred to egg as a binder. It was probably also used for the murals of the 3rd century Dura-Europos synagogue.

A related technique has been used also in ancient and early medieval paintings found in several caves and rock-cut temples in India. High-quality tempera art was created in Bagh Caves between the late 4th and 10th centuries, and in the 7th century in the Ravan Chhaya rock shelter located in Odisha.

Tempera was known from the classical world, where it appears to have taken over from encaustic painting and was the main medium used for panel painting and illuminated manuscripts in the Byzantine world and Medieval and Early Renaissance Europe. Tempera painting was the primary panel painting medium for nearly every painter in the European Medieval and Early Renaissance period up to 1500. For example, most surviving panel paintings attributed to Michelangelo are executed in egg tempera, an exception being his Doni Tondo which uses both tempera and oil paint.

Oil paint, which may have originated in Afghanistan between the 5th and 9th centuries and migrated westward in the Middle Ages, eventually superseded tempera in popularity. Oil replaced tempera as the principal medium used for creating artwork during the 15th century in Early Netherlandish painting in northern Europe. Around 1500, oil paint replaced tempera in Italy. In the 19th and 20th centuries, there were intermittent revivals of tempera technique in Western art among the Pre-Raphaelites, Social Realists, and others. Tempera painting continues to be used in Greece and Russia, where it is the traditional medium for Orthodox icons.

== Technique ==
Tempera is a broad term describing many types of paint, traditionally created by hand-grinding dry powdered pigments into a binding agent or medium, such as egg yolk, milk (in the form of casein) or a variety of plant gums.

=== Egg tempera ===
The most common form of classical tempera painting is "egg tempera". For this form most often only the contents of the egg yolk is used. The white of the egg and the membrane of the yolk are discarded (the membrane of the yolk is dangled over a receptacle and punctured to drain off the liquid inside). The egg yolk is diluted with water and used with pigment. Some kind of remedy is always added in different proportions. One recipe uses vinegar as a preservative, but only in small quantities, as vinegar will discolour pigments such as ultramarine. A few drops of vinegar will keep the solution for a week, but it is better to prepare fresh paint on a daily basis. Some egg tempera schools use different mixtures of egg yolk and water. Usually the ratio of yolk to water is 1:3, but other recipes use white wine (1 part yolk, 2 parts wine).

Powdered pigment, or pigment that has been ground in distilled water, is placed onto a palette or bowl and mixed with a roughly equal volume of the binder. Some pigments require slightly more binder, some require less.

When used to paint icons on church walls, liquid myrrh is sometimes added to the mixture to give the paint a pleasing odor, particularly as worshippers may find the egg tempera somewhat pungent for quite some time after completion. The paint mixture has to be constantly adjusted to maintain a balance between a "greasy" and "watery" consistency by adjusting the amount of water and yolk. As tempera gradually dries on the palette, the artist will add some water to preserve the consistency and to balance the thickening of the yolk on contact with air. Once prepared, the paint cannot be stored. As such, tubed egg tempera tends to be tempera grassa, using a 1:1 ratio of oil and egg yolk, as it must contain several preservatives such as oil. Egg tempera is water-resistant, but not waterproof. Different preparations use the egg white instead of the yolk or even the whole egg for a different effect. Other additives such as oil and wax emulsions can modify the medium. Egg tempera is not a flexible paint and requires stiff boards; painting on canvas will cause cracks to form and chips of paint to fall off.

Egg tempera paint should be cured for at least 3 months, up to 6 months. The surface is susceptible to scratches during the curing process, but will become much more durable after curing. Egg tempera paintings are not normally framed behind glass, as the glass can trap moisture and lead to the growth of mold.

=== Tempera grassa ===
Adding oil in no more than a 1:1 ratio with the egg yolk by volume produces a water-soluble medium with many of the color effects of oil paint, although it cannot be painted thickly as it will crack. Tempera grassa was detected in several Renaissance paintings by artists such as Botticelli.

=== Pigments ===
Some of the pigments used by medieval painters, such as cinnabar (contains mercury), orpiment (contains arsenic), or lead white (contains lead) are highly toxic if accidentally ingested or inhaled. Most artists today use modern synthetic pigments, which are less toxic but have similar color properties to the older pigments. Even so, many (if not most) modern pigments are still dangerous unless certain precautions are taken; these include keeping pigments wet in storage to avoid breathing their dust.

=== Application ===
Tempera paint dries rapidly. It is normally applied in thin, semi-opaque or transparent layers. Tempera painting allows for great precision when used with traditional techniques that often require the application of numerous small brush strokes applied in a cross-hatching technique. When dry, it produces a smooth satin or slightly matte finish. Because it cannot be applied in thick layers as oil paints can, tempera paintings rarely have the deep color saturation that oil paintings can achieve because the paint can hold less pigment (lower pigment load). In this respect, the colors of an unvarnished tempera painting resemble a fresco, although the color deepens if a varnish is applied. On the other hand, tempera colors do not change over time, whereas oil paints darken, yellow, and become transparent with age.

=== Ground ===
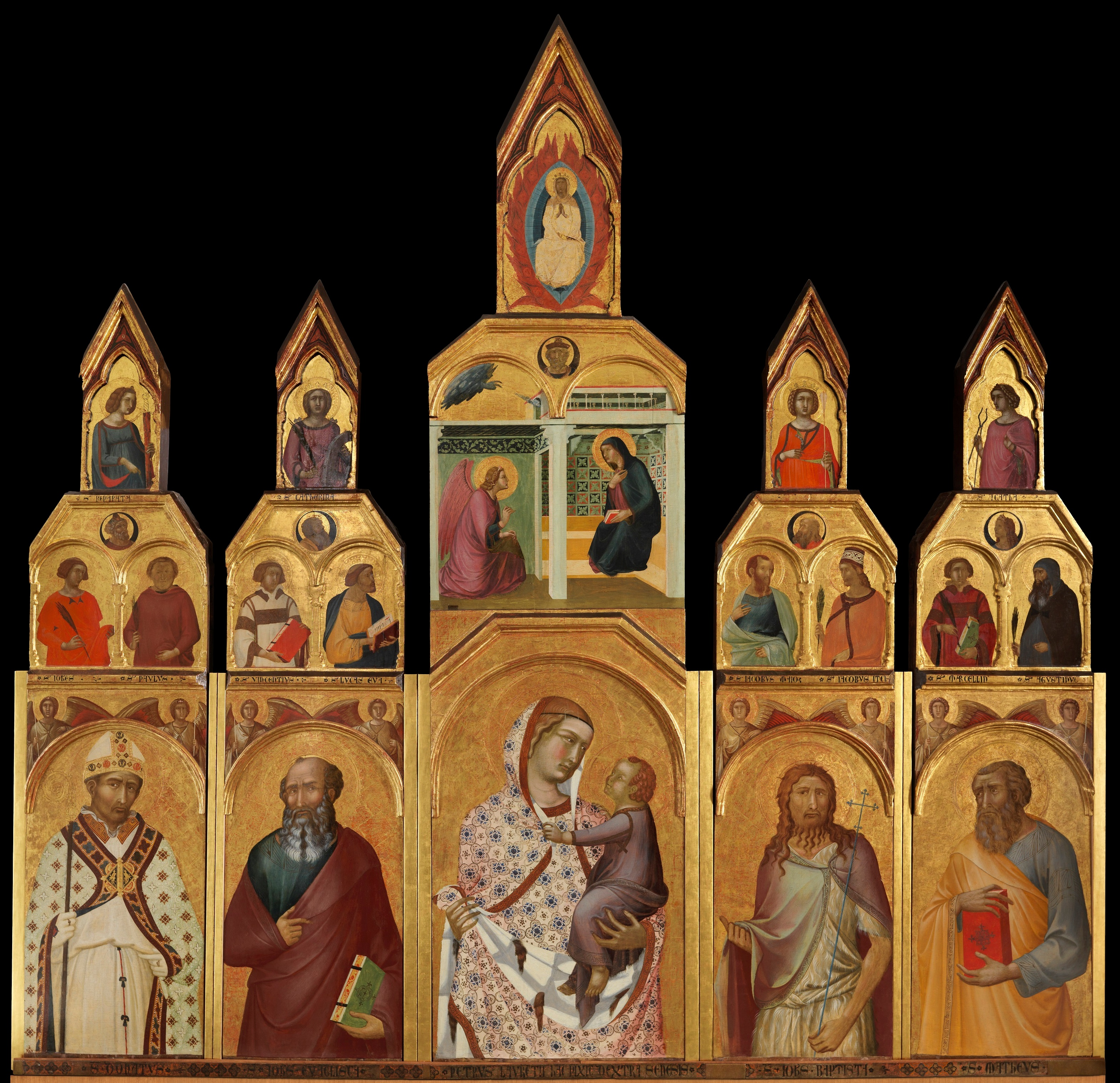
Pietro Lorenzetti's Tarlati polyptych, Tempera and gold on panel, 1320

Tempera adheres best to an absorbent ground. The ground traditionally used is inflexible Italian gesso, and the substrate is usually rigid as well. Historically wood panels were used as the substrate, and more recently un-tempered masonite or medium density fiberboard (MDF) have been employed; heavy paper is also used.

=== Pre-made paints ===
Apart from the traditional process of mixing pigment with egg yolk, new methods include egg tempera sold in tubes by manufacturers such as Sennelier and Daler-Rowney. These paints contain a slight amount of oil in order to extend longevity within the container. Notable egg tempera artist and author Koo Schadler points out that because of this addition of oil, "tubed 'egg tempera' paints are actually 'tempera grassa', an emulsion of egg yolk and a drying oil (generally with other additives, such as preservatives and stabilizers). Tempera grassa has some of the working properties of both egg tempera and oil painting and is a perfectly viable medium – however it is not the same as pure, homemade egg tempera and behaves differently." Marc Chagall used Sennelier egg tempera tube paints extensively.

Tempera paint was the original ingredient used by American inventor Bette Nesmith Graham when she was developing the stationary correction product Liquid Paper.

== Artists ==
Although tempera has been out of favor since the Late Renaissance and Baroque eras, it has been periodically rediscovered by later artists such as William Blake, the Nazarenes, the Pre-Raphaelites, and Joseph Southall. The 19th and 20th century saw a significant revival of tempera, partially due to the publication of Cennino Cennini's Il libro dell'arte in 1821, and the Society of Painters in Tempera being created in 1901. European painters who worked with tempera include Giorgio de Chirico, Otto Dix, Eliot Hodgkin, Pyke Koch, and Pietro Annigoni, who used an emulsion of egg yolks, stand oil and varnish.

Spanish surrealist painter Remedios Varo worked extensively in egg tempera.

=== Revival in 20th-century American art ===
The tempera medium was used by American artists such as the Regionalists Andrew Wyeth, Thomas Hart Benton and his students James Duard Marshall and Roger Medearis; expressionists Ben Shahn, Mitchell Siporin and John Langley Howard, magic realists George Tooker, Paul Cadmus, Jared French, Julia Thecla and Louise E. Marianetti, realist painter David Hanna; Art Students League of New York instructors Kenneth Hayes Miller and William C. Palmer, Social Realists Kyra Markham, Isabel Bishop, Reginald Marsh, and Noel Rockmore, Edward Laning, Anton Refregier, Jacob Lawrence, Rudolph F. Zallinger, Robert Vickrey, Peter Hurd, and science fiction artist John Schoenherr, notable as the cover artist of Dune.

=== 20th-century Indian art ===
In the early part of the 20th century, a large number of Indian artists, most notably of the Bengal school, took up tempera as one of their primary media of expression. Artists such as Gaganendranath Tagore, Asit Kumar Haldar, Abanindranath Tagore, Nandalal Bose, Kalipada Ghoshal and Sughra Rababi were foremost in this movement. After the 1950s, artists such as Jamini Roy and Ganesh Pyne established tempera as a medium for the new age artists of India.

=== In contemporary art ===
Other practicing tempera artists include Philip Aziz, Ernst Fuchs, Antonio Roybal, George Huszar, Donald Jackson, Tim Lowly, Altoon Sultan, Shaul Shats, Sandro Chia, Alex Colville, Robert Vickrey, Andrew Wyeth, Andrew Grassie, Soheila Sokhanvari, and Ganesh Pyne.

Ken Danby (1940–2007), a Canadian realist artist, used egg tempera for his best known works, such as At the Crease, Lacing Up, and Pancho.

Robert Clinch (b. 1957) is an Australian realist painter who, thanks to the 1993 Marten Bequest Travelling Scholarship, was able to conduct extensive research into egg tempera and has since completed multiple works in the medium.

In 2013, American fine artists Elena Vladimir Baranoff and Anastasia Elena Baranoff founded Egg Tempera Movement in London, United Kingdom. Elena Vladimir Baranoff and Anastasia Elena Baranoff established Egg Tempera Movement to promote and preserve the egg tempera painting technique.

== Gallery ==
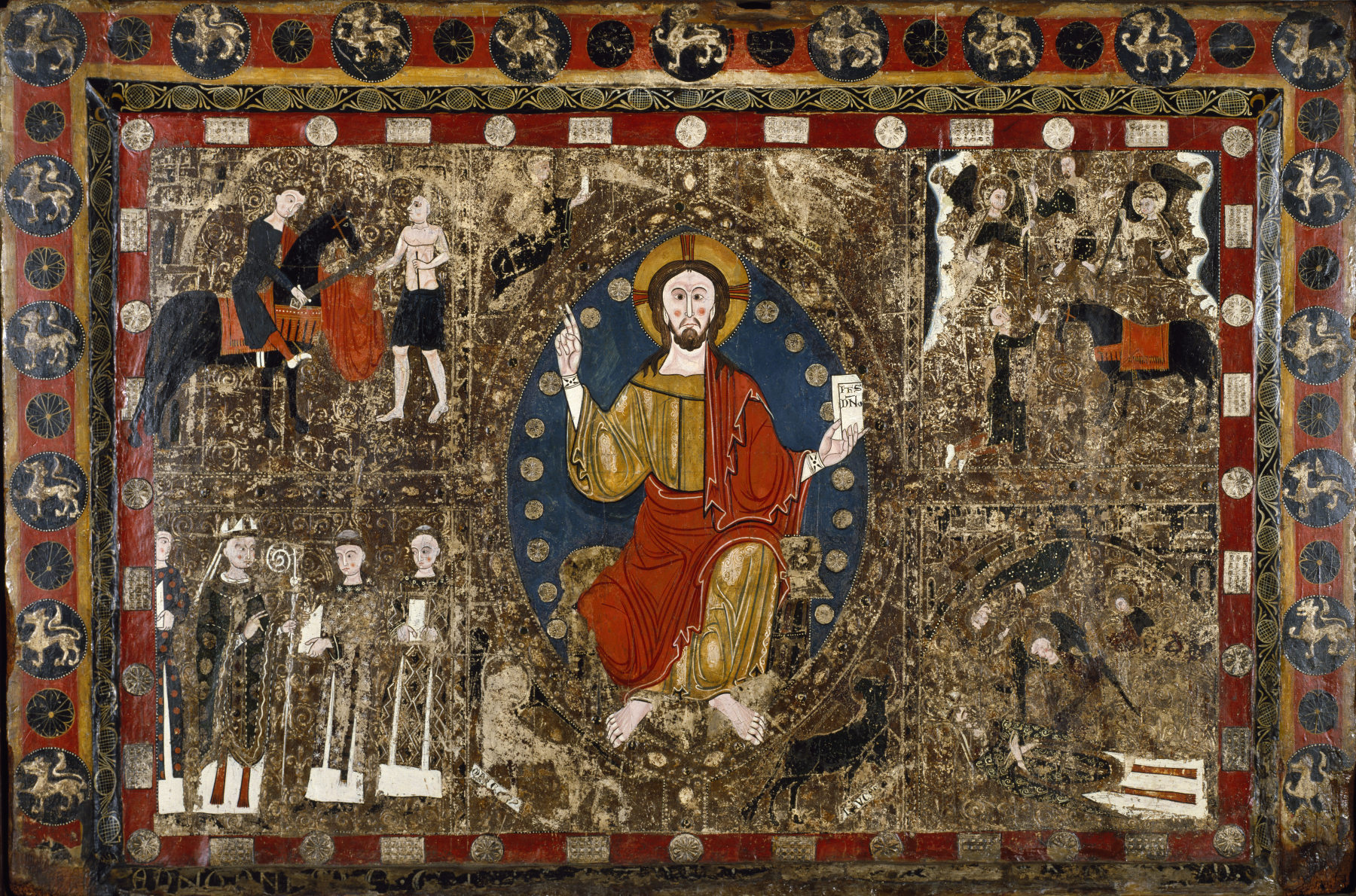
Spanish, Altar Frontal with Christ in Majesty and the Life of Saint Martin, 1250, The Walters Art Museum

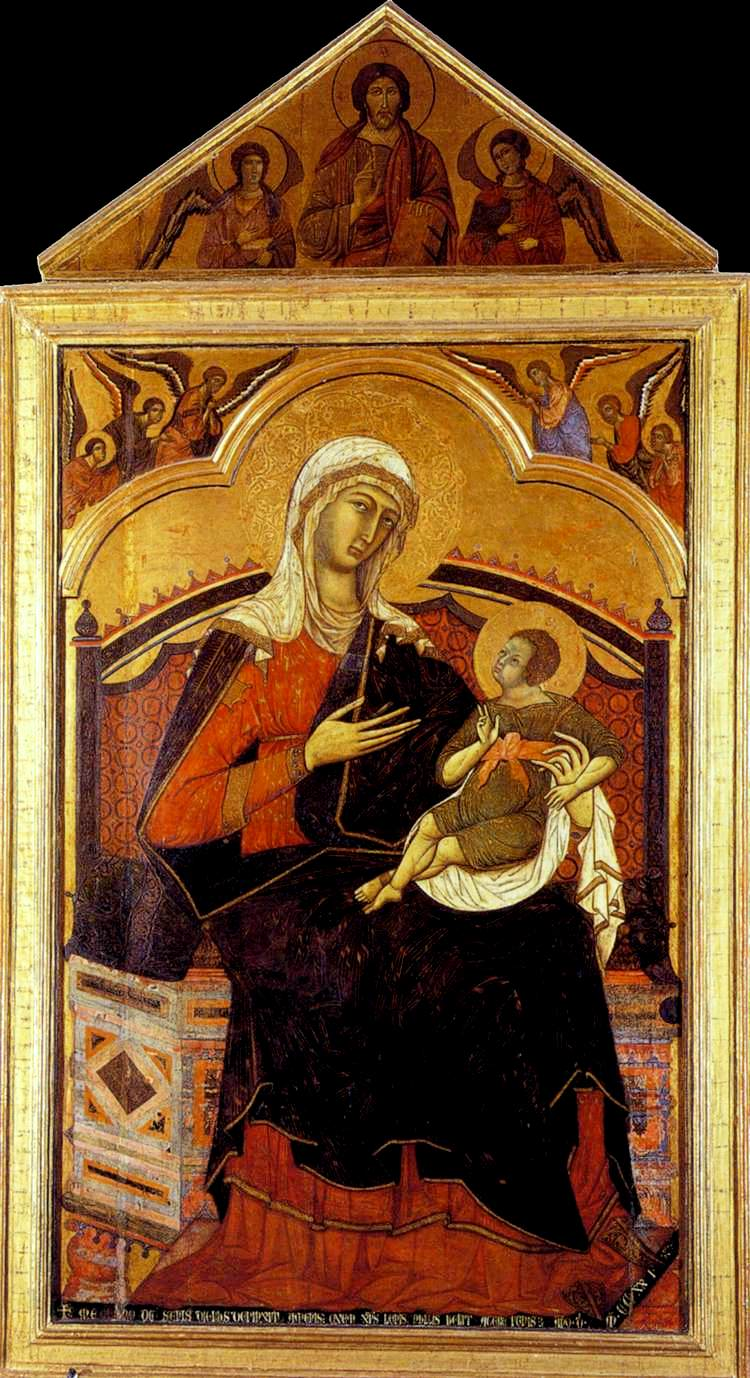
Guido da Siena, Madonna, Church of San Regolo, Siena, tempera and gold on panel, 1285–1295

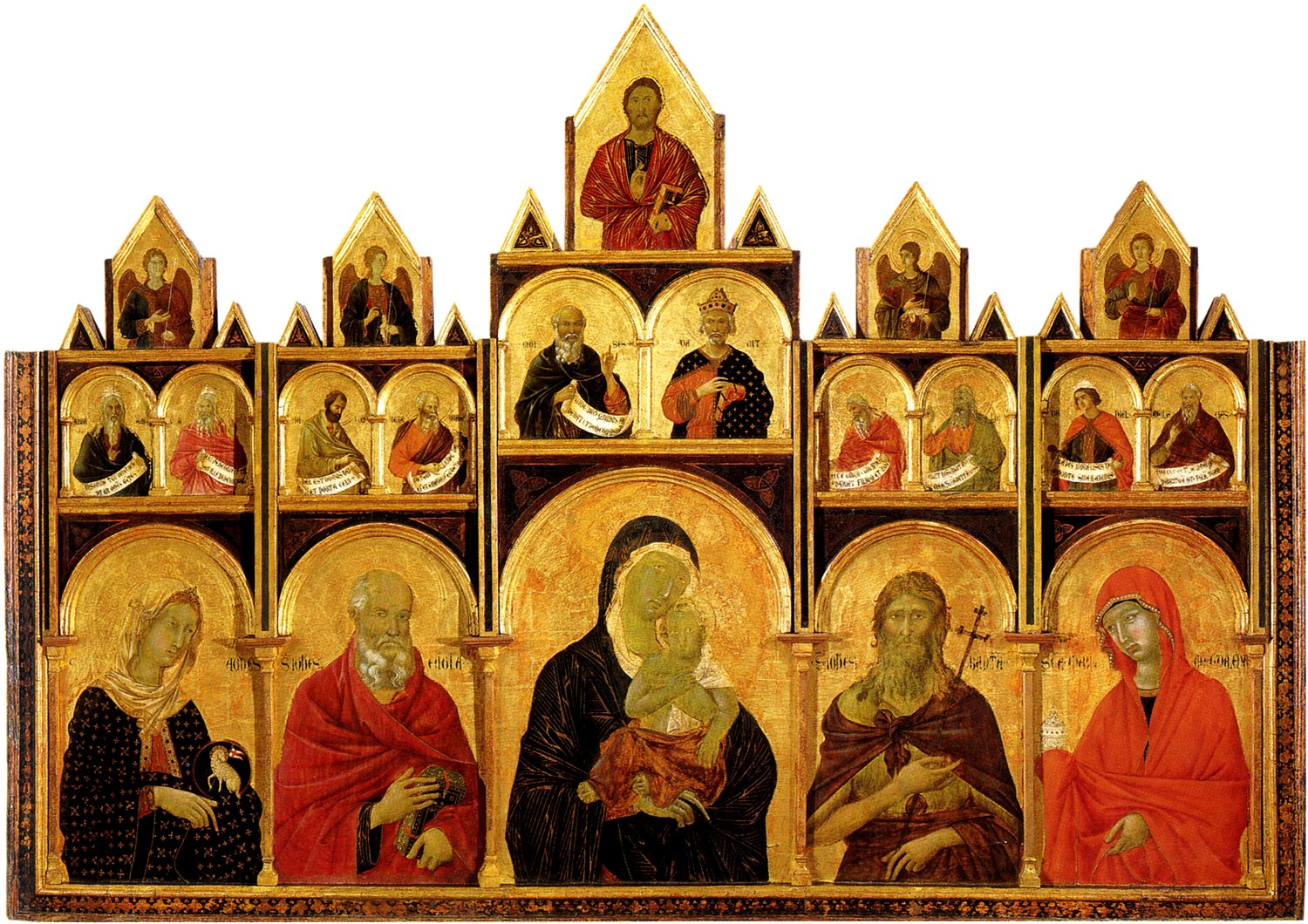
Duccio, Madonna and Child with Saints Polyptych, tempera and gold on wood, 1311–1318

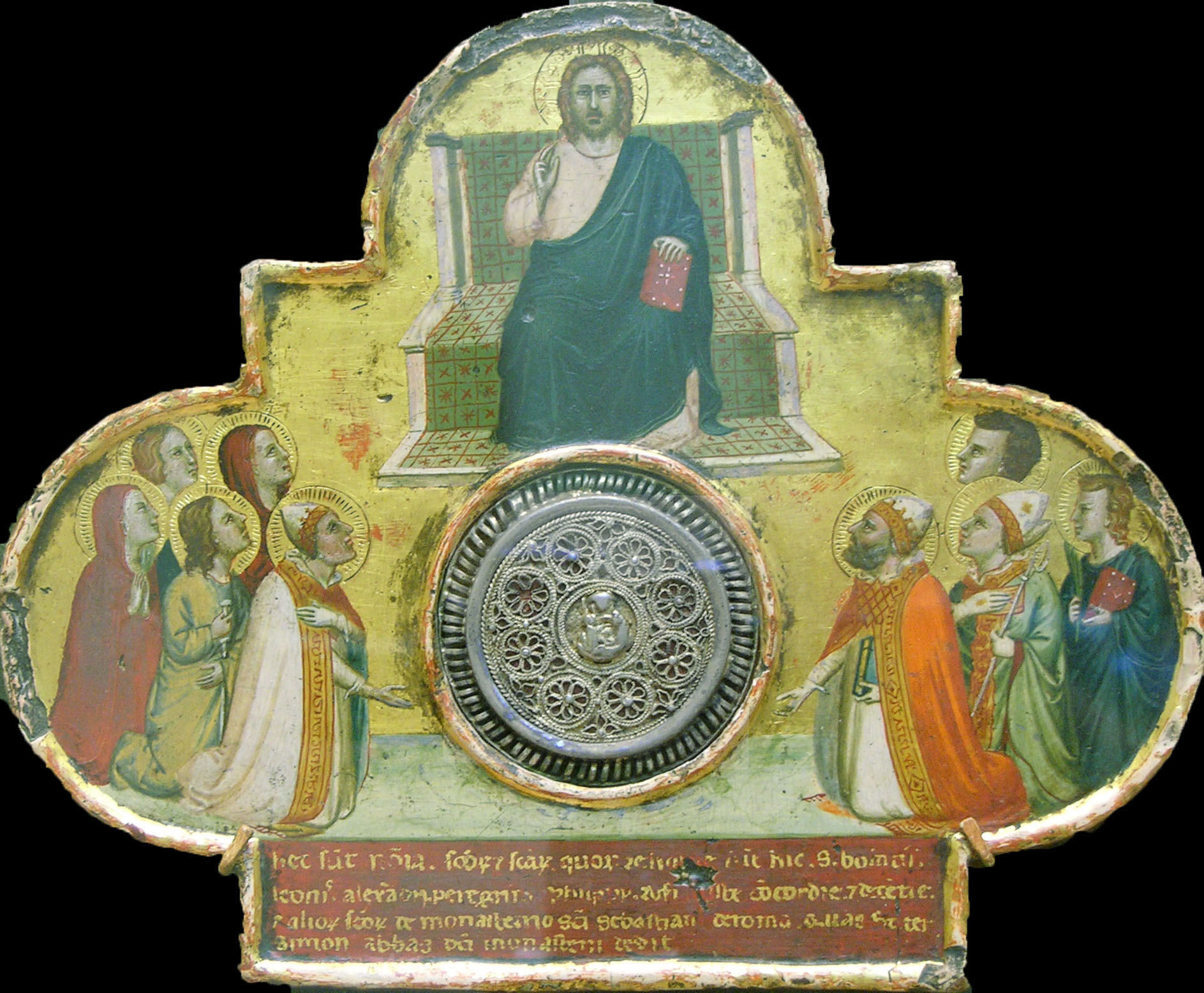
Bernardo Daddi, Christ Enthroned with Saints Sebastian, Leo, Alexander, Peregrine, Philip, Rufianiaus, Justa, Concordius and Decentius, 14th century

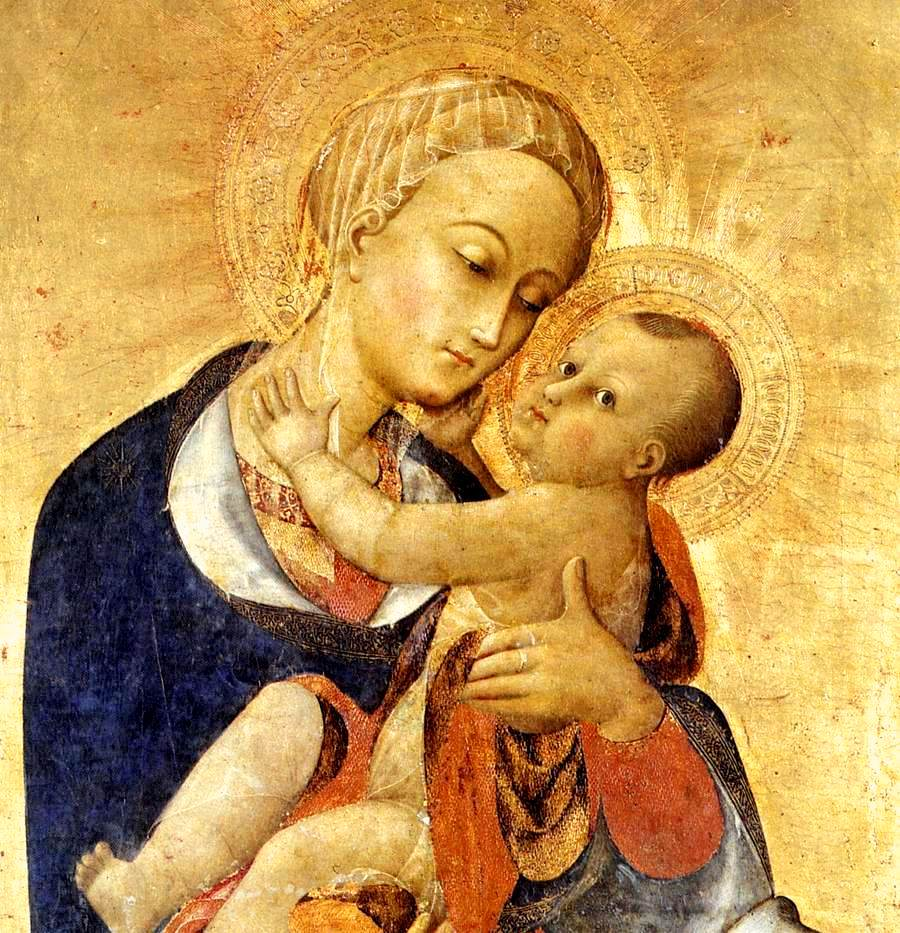
Sassetta, detail of Virgin and Child with Four Saints, tempera on wood, 1435

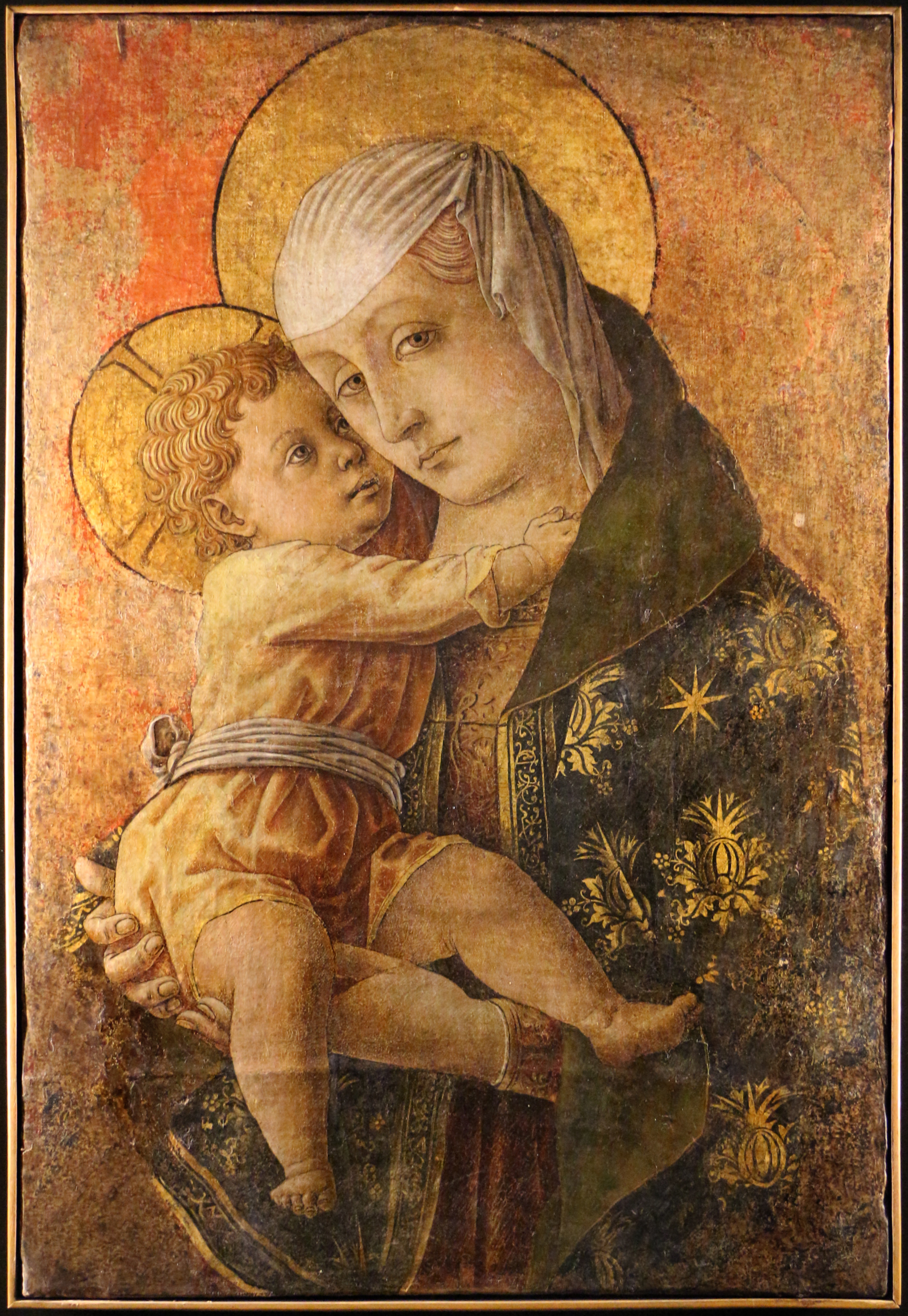
Carlo Crivelli, Madonna with Child, tempera on wood, transferred to canvas, 1470

Sandro Botticelli, The Birth of Venus, tempera on canvas, c. 1486

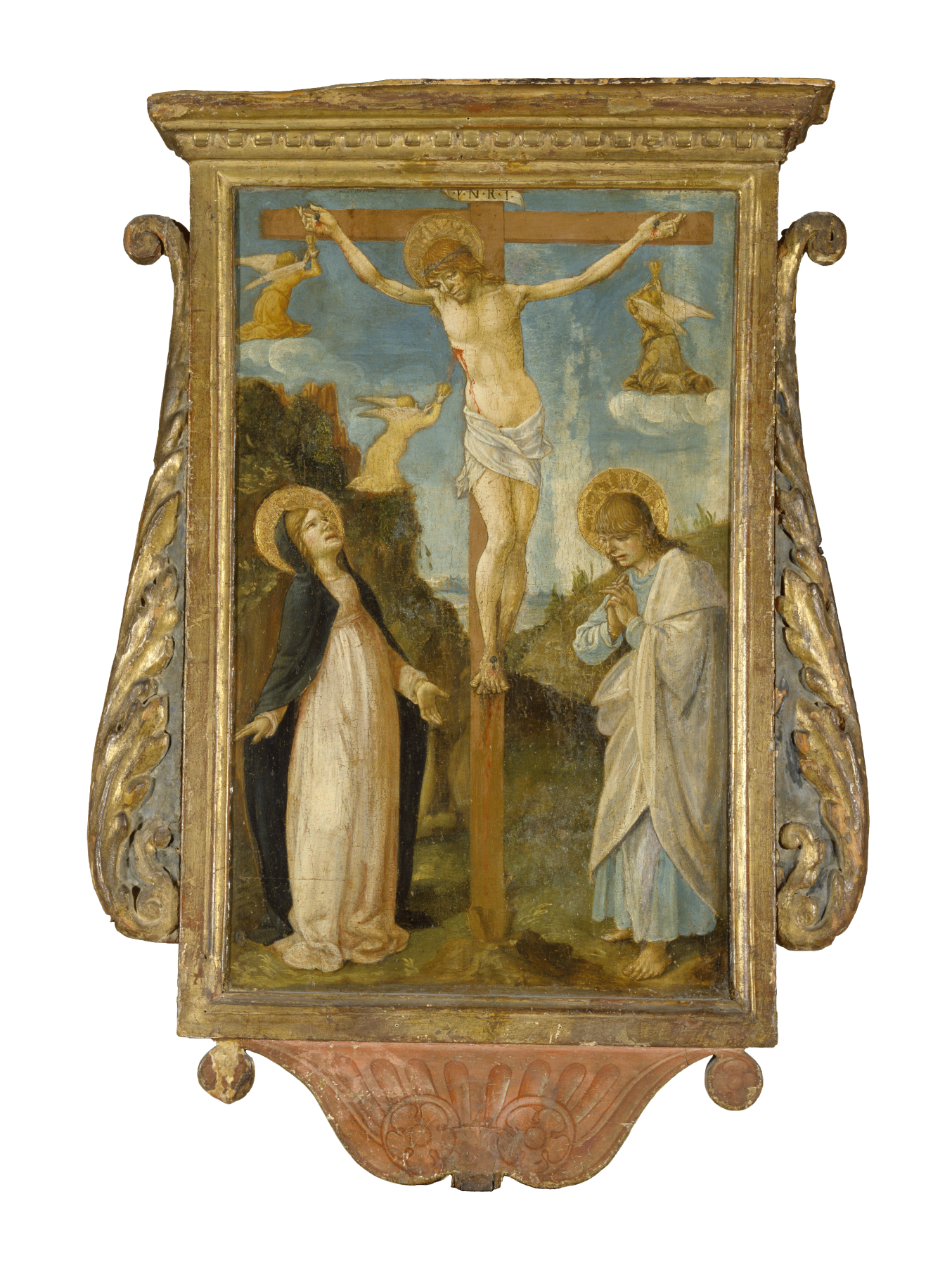
Lorenzo d'Alessandro, The Crucifixion; Saint Michael, c. 1480–1490, The Walters Art Museum

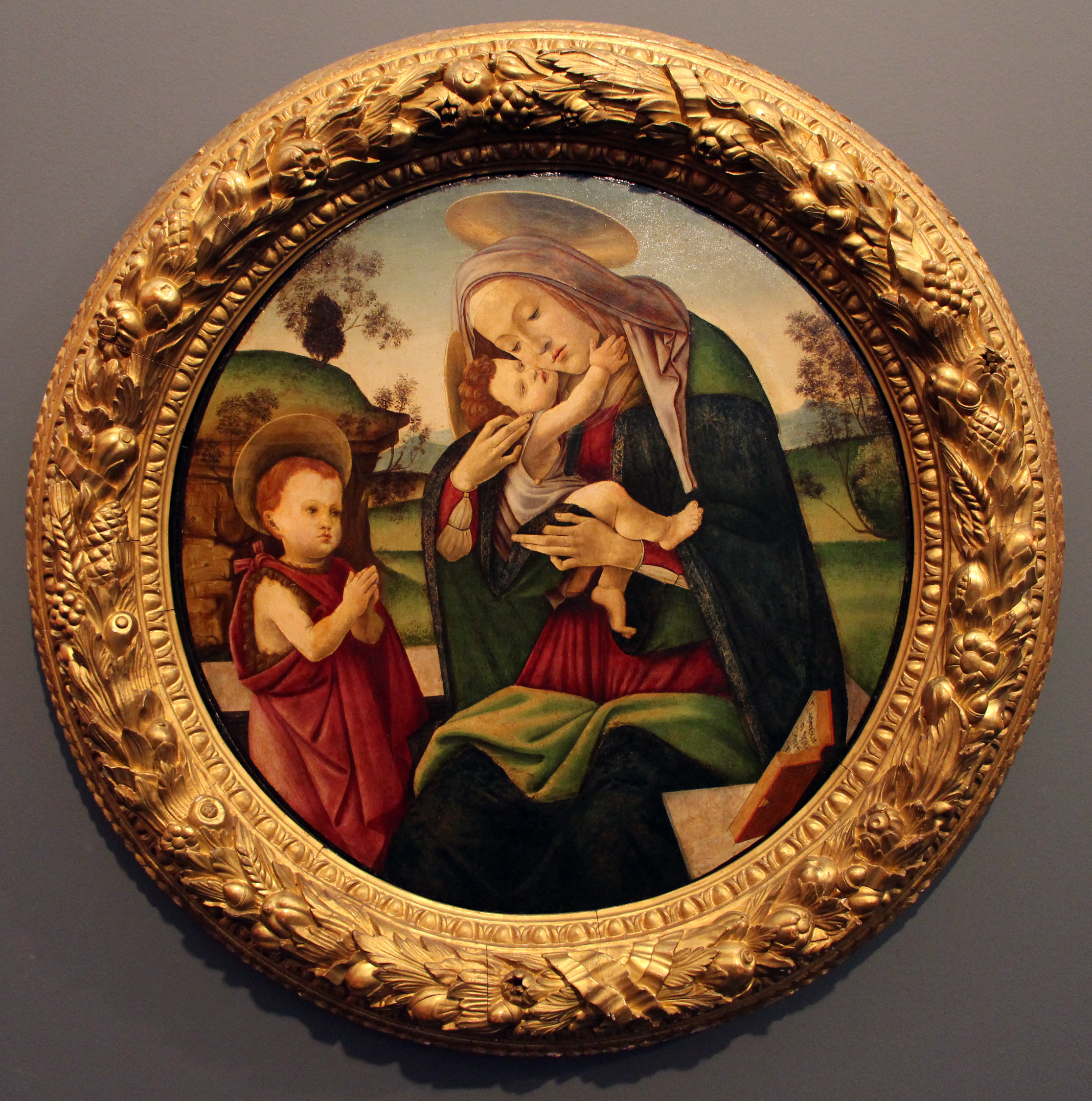
Sandro Botticelli, tempera on panel, 1490–1500

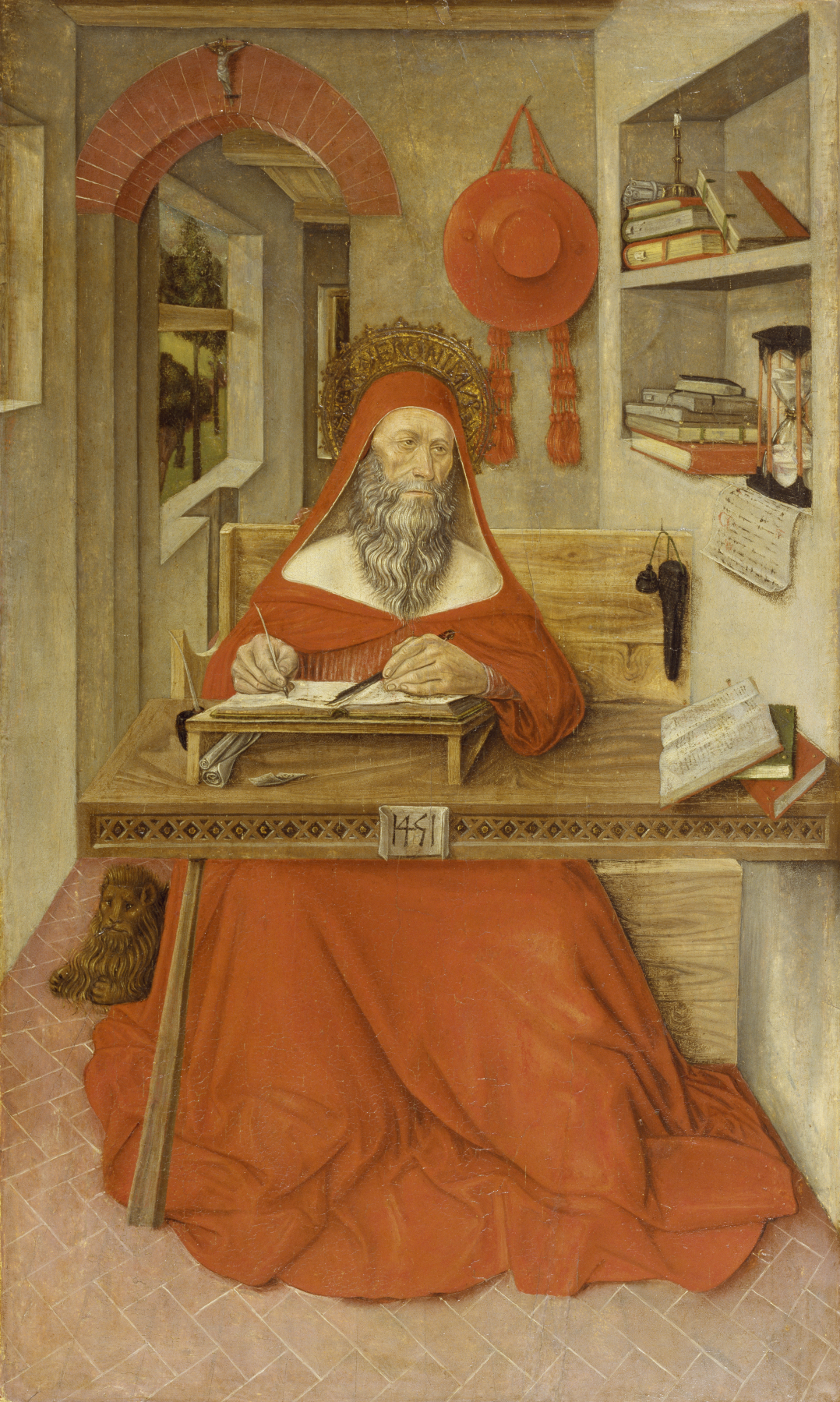
Antonio da Fabriano, Saint Jerome in His Study, 1451, The Walters Art Museum

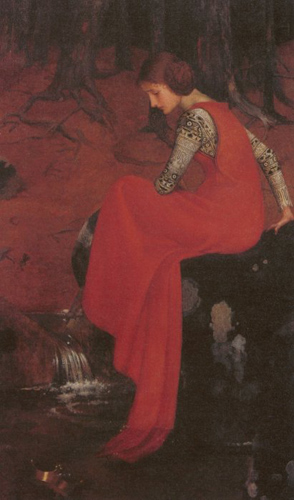
Marianne Stokes, Melisande, tempera on canvas, 1895–1898

== See also ==
- Glue-size
- Gold ground
