= Melisande =

Melisande may refer to:

- Mélisande (électrotrad), a Canadian folk music group.
- Melisande (Stokes), an 1890s painting by Marianne Stokes.
- a main character in the 1893 play Pelléas and Mélisande and the 1902 opera based on it.
- Melisande, female lead character in the 1925 film The Big Parade.
- Melisande Shahrizai, the primary villain of Jacqueline Carey's Kushiel's Legacy series.
- "Melisande," a short story by E. Nesbit.
- Melisande! What Are Dreams?, a 2012 novel by Hillel Halkin.

== See also ==
- Pelléas and Mélisande (disambiguation)
- Melisende (disambiguation)
- Millicent (disambiguation)
- Melisandre, a character in George R. R. Martin's A Song of Ice and Fire and its adaptation Game of Thrones.
