= Millicent =

Millicent or Milicent is a feminine given name that has been in use since the Middle Ages. The English form Millicent derives from the Old French Melisende, stemming from the Gothic name Amalaswinþa/Amalaswintha (from amal meaning 'work' and swinth meaning 'strength'). The name has gone through many variations, with Melisent first being more usual, eventually giving way to the now more common Millicent.

== People ==
- Millicent Armstrong (1888–1973), Australian playwright
- Milicent Bagot (1907–2006), British intelligence officer
- Millicent Bandmann-Palmer (1845–1926), English actress
- Barbara Millicent Roberts (Barbie) (March 9, 1959–), American Doll
- Millicent Baxter (1888–1984), New Zealand pacifist
- Millicent Borges Accardi, Portuguese-American poet and writer
- Millicent Browne (1881–1975), British suffragette
- Millicent Dillon (1925–2025), American writer
- Millicent Fawcett (1847–1929), English suffragist, feminist, intellectual, political and union leader and writer
- Millicent Fenwick (1910–1992), American fashion editor and politician
- Millicent S. Ficken (1933–2020), American ornithologist
- Millicent Hearst (1882–1974), American socialite and philanthropist, wife of media tycoon William Randolph Hearst
- Millicent Leveson-Gower, Duchess of Sutherland (1867–1955), British society hostess, social reformer, author, editor, journalist and playwright
- Millicent Mackenzie (1863–1942), British professor of education, first female professor in Wales and the first appointed to a fully chartered university in the United Kingdom
- Millicent Martin (born 1934), British actress, singer and comedian
- Millicent Preston-Stanley (1883–1955), Australian feminist and politician, first female member of the New South Wales Legislative Assembly
- Millicent Rogers (1902–1953), American socialite and art collector
- Millicent Selsam (1912–1996), American children's author
- Milicent Shinn (1858–1940), American child psychologist, first woman to receive a doctorate from the University of California, Berkeley
- Millicent Silver (1905–1986), British harpsichordist, pianist and violinist
- Millicent Simmonds (born 2003), a deaf actor
- Millie Small (1947–2020), Jamaican singer-songwriter
- Millicent Sowerby (1878–1967), English painter and illustrator,
- See also Amalasuintha, queen of the Ostrogoths

== Fictional characters ==
- Millicent Quibb, eccentric mad scientist from the 2024 book The Millicent Quibb School of Etiquette for Young Ladies of Mad Science by Kate McKinnon.
- Millicent, character in the action role-playing game Elden Ring
- Millicent Carew, fiancée to Dr. Jekyll in the 1920 film adaptation of Dr. Jekyll and Mr. Hyde
- Millicent Higgens, secretary to Dr. Turner in Call The Midwife
- Millicent, in the 1957 Bugs Bunny cartoon Rabbit Romeo
- Millicent, fictional term for police officers in the nadsat slang of the 1962 novel A Clockwork Orange by Anthony Burgess
- Millicent, character in the 1973 Brady Bunch episode "Never Too Young" (Season 5, No. 4)
- Millicent Collins, comic book heroine best known as Millie the Model
- Millicent Bulstrode, in the Harry Potter series
- Millicent Bystander, the mistaken alias of Roddy St. James in the 2006 film Flushed Away
- Millicent Min, heroine of Millicent Min, Girl Genius, 2003 novel by Lisa Yee
- Millicent Huxtable, in the television series One Tree Hill
- Millicent Mudd, in the webcomic Ozy and Millie
- Millicent Weems, in the 2008 film Synecdoche, New York
- Millicent Carter, recurring character in ER.
- Millicent Arnold, in the short story "Initiation" by Sylvia Plath
- Millicent "Penny" Woods, a character on the television series Good Times
- Millicent "Millie" Princey, a character on the episode "Wet Saturday" of the series Alfred Hitchcock Presents
- Millicent Barnes, main character in the 1960 Twilight Zone episode "Mirror Image"
- Millicent Gergich, recurring character in the television series Parks and Recreation
- Millicent Collins, a Collins family ancestor in the 1960s soap opera Dark Shadows
- Milicent Darnham, in the 1831 novel Mothers and Daughters (vol. 3) by Catherine Gore
- Millicent Crosswire, mother of Muffy Crosswire in the 1996 cartoon adaption Arthur (TV series)
- Millicent Fritton, headmistress of St Trinian's School in the British cartoon series and films.
- Millicent "Minx" Lawrence, a young girl who becomes a friend of Drill and player of his game in the television series The Whispers
- Aunt Millicent, an original character created for the 2003 film adaptation of Peter Pan, portrayed by Lynn Redgrave
- Millicent Margaret Amanda, full name of the title character in the Milly-Molly-Mandy series
- Millicent Griffith, Surgeon General of the United States in The West Wing
- "U.S.S." Millicent Kent, a student at Enfield Tennis Academy in the 1996 novel Infinite Jest by David Foster Wallace
- Millicent Torkelson, matriarch of the titular family in the television series The Torkelsons

== See also ==
- Melisende (disambiguation)
- Melisande (disambiguation)
- Millie (disambiguation)
- Amalasuntha
