= Khouzestan Oxin Steel Company =

Iranian steel company

- Company type: Public company
- Industry: Steel
- Founded: 2005 in Ahvaz, Iran
- Headquarters: Ahvaz, Iran
- Website: oxinsteel.ir

Khouzestan Oxin Steel company (Persian: شرکت فولاد اکسین خوزستان) is an Iranian steel company that produces various types of steel sheets needed to manufacture storage tanks for petroleum products and other steel products. Oxin Steel was founded in 2005 and began mass production in 2009. Currently, the company's production capacity is equivalent to one million tons of steel products per year. The company's head office and manufacturing plant are located in Ahvaz. From 2009 to 2021, the company's annual production was about 700,000 tons, while its stated capacity is one million and 50 thousand tons.

== History ==
Khouzestan Oxin Steel Company was established in 2005. The company started mass production in 2009. After its establishment from 2005 to 2008, the plant installation operations took place. In 2009, the plant was launched and started operating, and in 2010, mass production began. In 2012, it surpassed the production threshold of 600 thousand tons. Also in 2013, it launched heat treatment furnaces and production of specialty products, and was introduced by the Iran Standards Organization as the top steel company in the country.

== Products ==
Products used in oil and gas transmission lines account for 53% of the products manufactured by the company, more than 30% are related to companies producing pressure vessels and tanks for oil and gas storage, and about 10% are used in building materials. The nominal capacity of Oxin Steel Company is one million and 50 thousand tons per year. The nominal production capacity of sheets in this company is announced to be 1,050 thousand tons per year, about 210 thousand tons of which have the possibility of heat treatment operations. The raw material consumed in this company is steel slabs supplied from continuous casting steel plants. The dimensions of these steel slabs are 110 to 130 millimeters in thickness, 1,200 to 2,200 millimeters in width and 3,000 to 4,500 millimeters in length.
