= Melisende =

Melisende was a popular French name in the Middle Ages, and may refer to:

- Melisende, Queen of Jerusalem (1105–1161), queen regnant of the Kingdom of Jerusalem
- Melisende, Viscountess of Châteaudun (died before 1040)
- Melisende of Arsuf (born before 1177), French noblewoman
- Melisende of Lusignan (1200–after 1249), Princess of Antioch
- Melisende of Piquigny, possible mother of Godfrey de Saint-Omer (11th–12th century)
- Melisende of Tripoli (fl. c. 1160), cousin of the King of Jerusalem

== See also ==
- Melisande (disambiguation)
- Millicent (disambiguation)
