= Phileas =

Phileas can refer to:

- Phileas (public transport), in the Netherlands
- Phileas Fogg, the lead figure from Around the World in Eighty Days
- Phileas Fogg snacks, in the United Kingdom
- Phileas and Philoromus, early Egyptian martyrs

== See also ==
- Pelleas and Pelleas and Melisande (disambiguation)
