= Pelléas and Mélisande (disambiguation) =

Pelléas and Mélisande is a Symbolist play by Maurice Maeterlinck.

Pelléas and Mélisande may also refer to several adaptations:

- Pelléas et Mélisande (opera), a 1902 opera by Claude Debussy
- Pelleas und Melisande (Schoenberg), a symphonic poem by Arnold Schoenberg
- Pelléas et Mélisande (Fauré), a suite written by Gabriel Fauré for the Maeterlinck play
- Pelléas et Mélisande (Sibelius), incidental music written by Jean Sibelius
- Pelléas et Mélisande (Herbert von Karajan recording)
- Pelléas and Mélisande, a musical suite by composer William Wallace, which predates the more well-known settings
- Pelléas and Mélisande, a ballet choreographed by Roland Petit with music by Arnold Schoenberg which debuted in 1969 at the Royal Opera House, London

== See also ==
- Melisande (disambiguation)
- Pelleas, an Arthurian Knight of the Round Table
- Phileas (disambiguation)
