= Petroleum product =

Products ultimately derived from crude oil

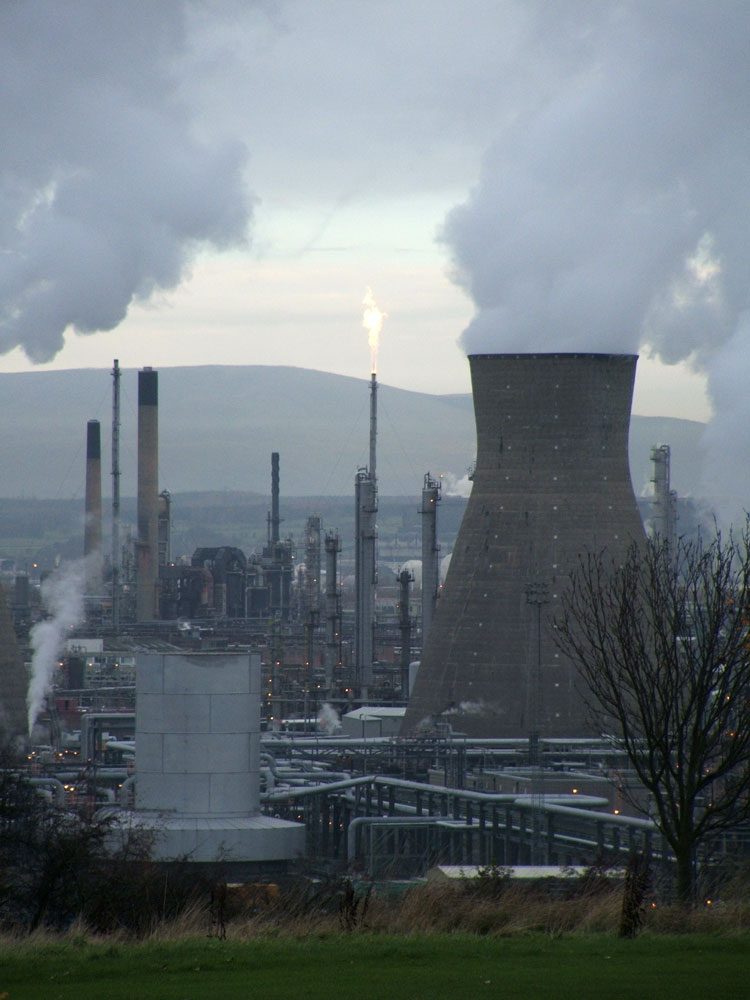
A petrochemical refinery in Grangemouth, Scotland

Petroleum products are materials derived from crude oil (petroleum) as it is processed in oil refineries. Unlike petrochemicals, which are a collection of well-defined usually pure organic compounds, petroleum products are complex mixtures. Most petroleum is converted into petroleum products, which include several classes of fuels.

According to the composition of the crude oil and depending on the demands of the market, refineries can produce different shares of petroleum products. The largest share of oil products is used as "energy carriers", i.e. various grades of fuel oil and gasoline. These fuels include or can be blended to give gasoline, jet fuel, diesel fuel, heating oil, and heavier fuel oils. Heavier (less volatile) fractions can also be used to produce asphalt, tar, paraffin wax, lubricating and other heavy oils. Refineries also produce other chemicals, some of which are used in chemical processes to produce plastics and other useful materials. Since petroleum often contains a few percent sulfur-containing molecules, elemental sulfur is also often produced as a petroleum product. Carbon, in the form of petroleum coke, and hydrogen may also be produced as petroleum products. The hydrogen produced is often used as an intermediate product for other oil refinery processes such as hydrocracking and hydrodesulfurization.

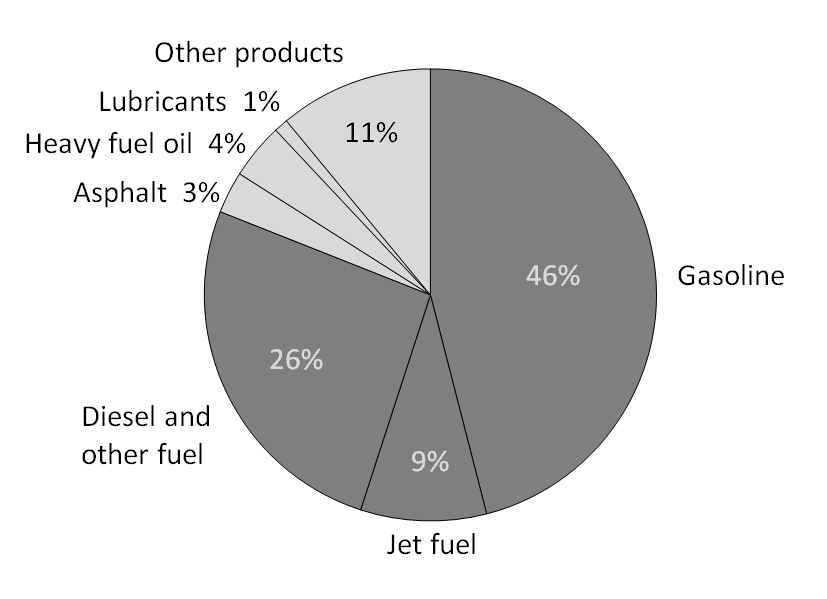
A breakdown of the products made from a typical barrel of US oil

== Specialty and by-products ==
Oil refineries will blend various feedstocks, mix appropriate additives, provide short-term storage, and prepare for bulk loading to trucks, barges, product ships, and railcars.

- Gasses like propane and methane are stored within petroleum.
- Liquid fuels blending (producing automotive and aviation grades of gasoline, kerosene, various aviation turbine fuels, and diesel fuels, adding dyes, detergents, antiknock additives, oxygenates, and anti-fungal compounds as required). Shipped by barge, rail, and tanker ship. May be shipped regionally in dedicated pipelines to point consumers, particularly aviation jet fuel to major airports, or piped to distributors in multi-product pipelines using product separators called pipeline inspection gauges ("pigs").
- Lubricants (produces light machine oils, motor oils, and greases, adding viscosity stabilizers as required), usually shipped in bulk to an offsite packaging plant.
- Paraffin wax, used in illumination (candle wax) and other uses. May be shipped in bulk to a site to prepare as packaged blocks.
- Slack wax, a raw refinery output comprising a mixture of oil and wax used as a precursor for scale wax and paraffin wax and as-is in non-food products such as wax emulsions, construction board, matches, candles, rust protection, and vapour barriers.
- Sulfur, by-product of sulfur removal from petroleum, which contain percent of organosulfur compounds.
- Bulk tar shipping for offsite unit packaging for use in tar-and-gravel roofing or similar uses.
- Asphalt, used as a binder for gravel to form asphalt concrete, which is used for paving roads, lots, etc. An asphalt unit prepares bulk asphalt for shipment.
- Petroleum coke, used in specialty carbon products such as certain types of electrodes, or as solid fuel.
- Petrochemicals or petrochemical feedstocks such as ethylene,

== Petroleum by-products ==
Over 6,000 items are made from petroleum waste by-products, including: fertilizer, flooring (floor covering), perfume, insecticide, petroleum jelly, soap, vitamins and some essential amino acids.

== Gallery ==
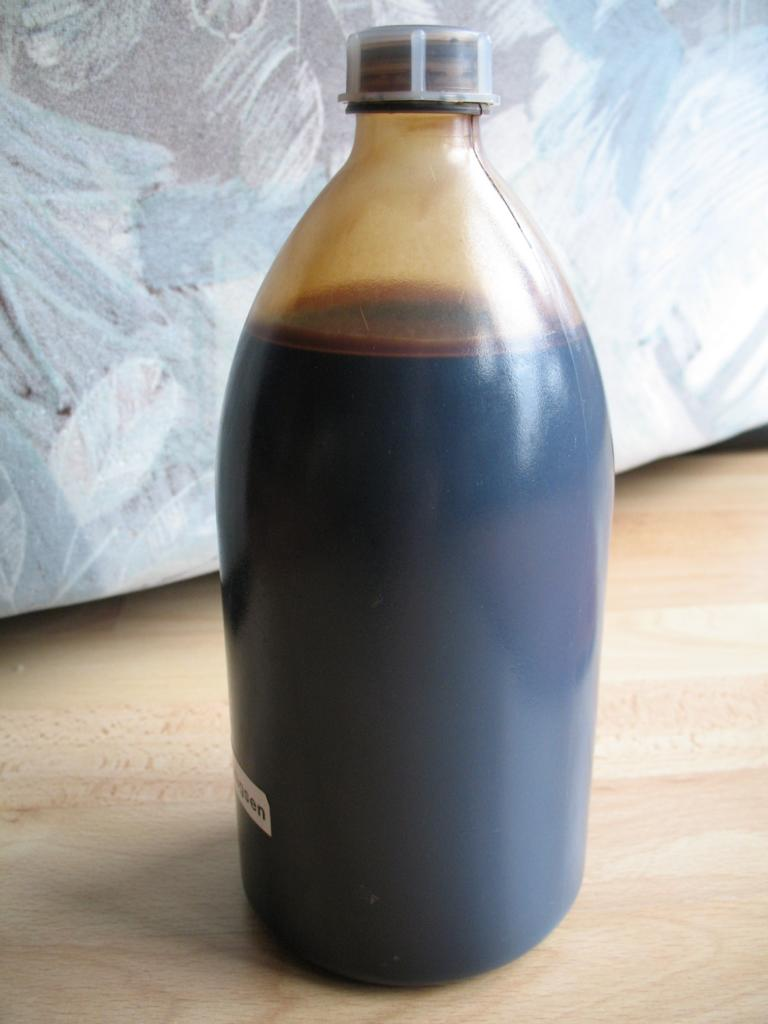
Sample of crude oil (petroleum)

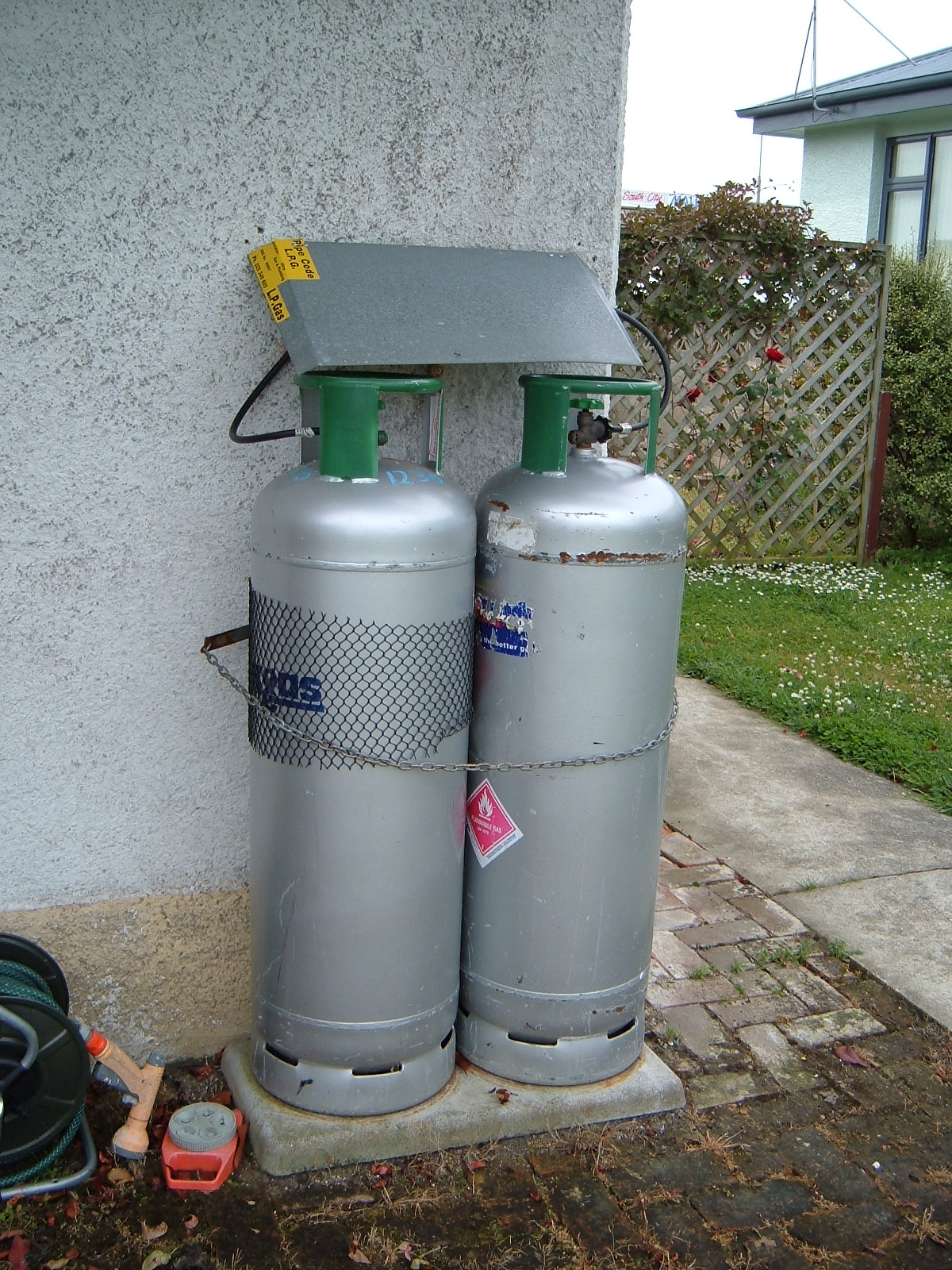
Cylinders of liquified petroleum gas

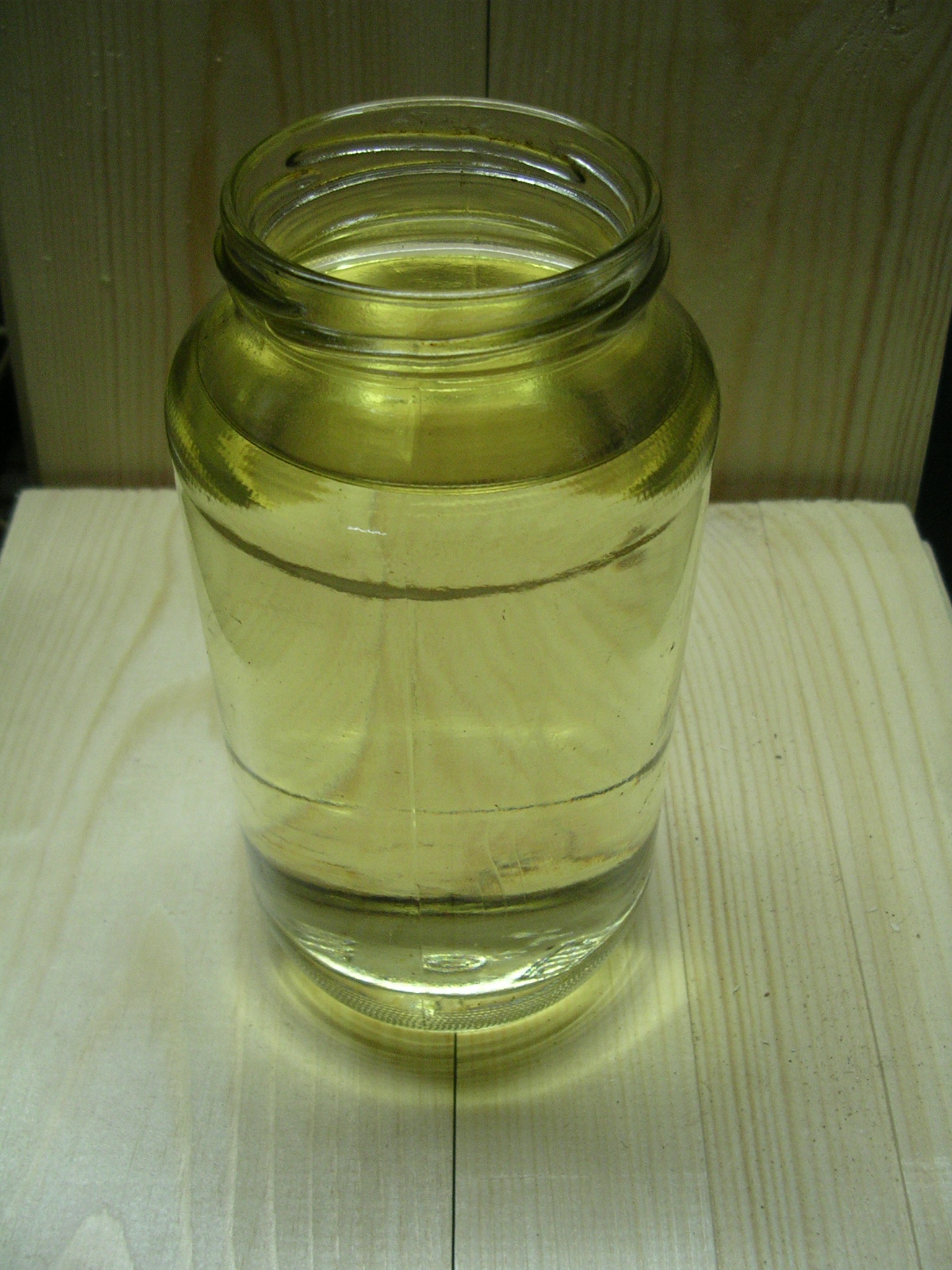
Sample of gasoline (petrol)

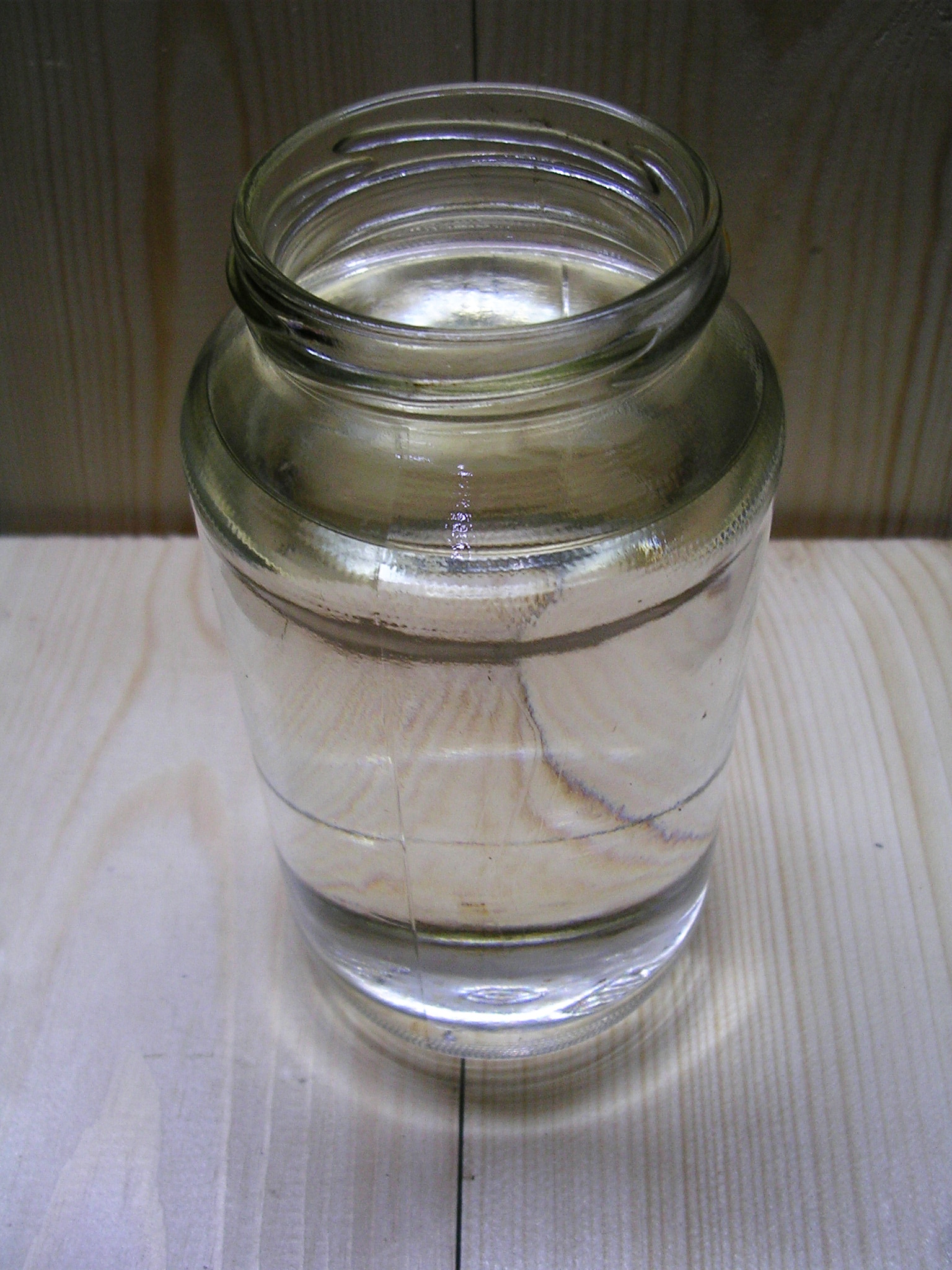
Sample of kerosene

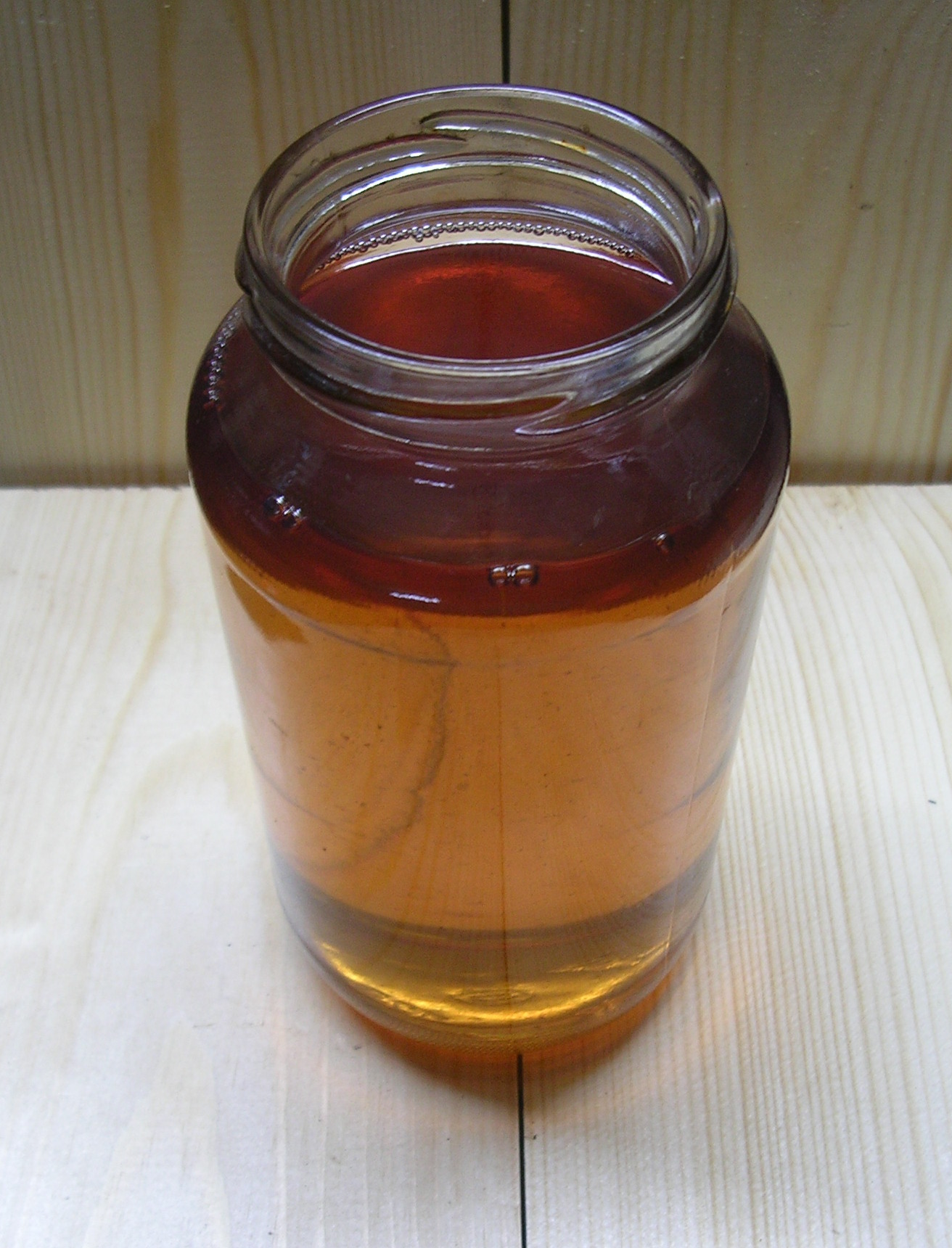
Sample of diesel fuel

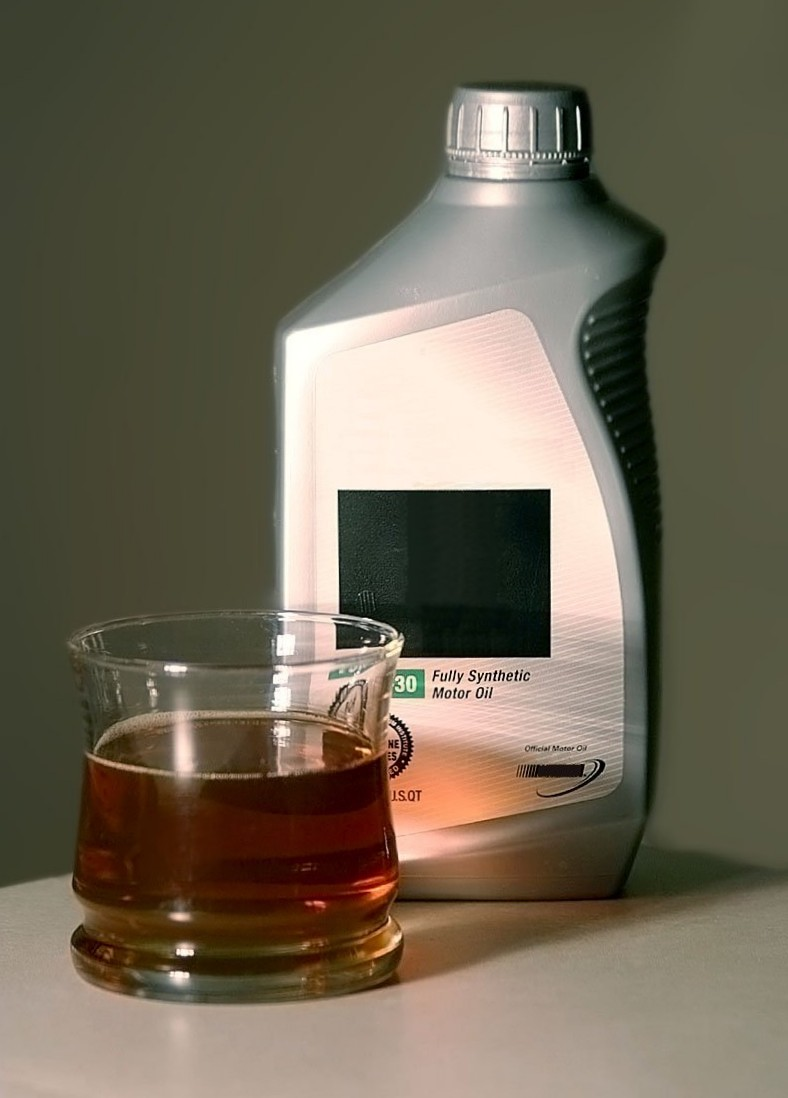
Motor oil

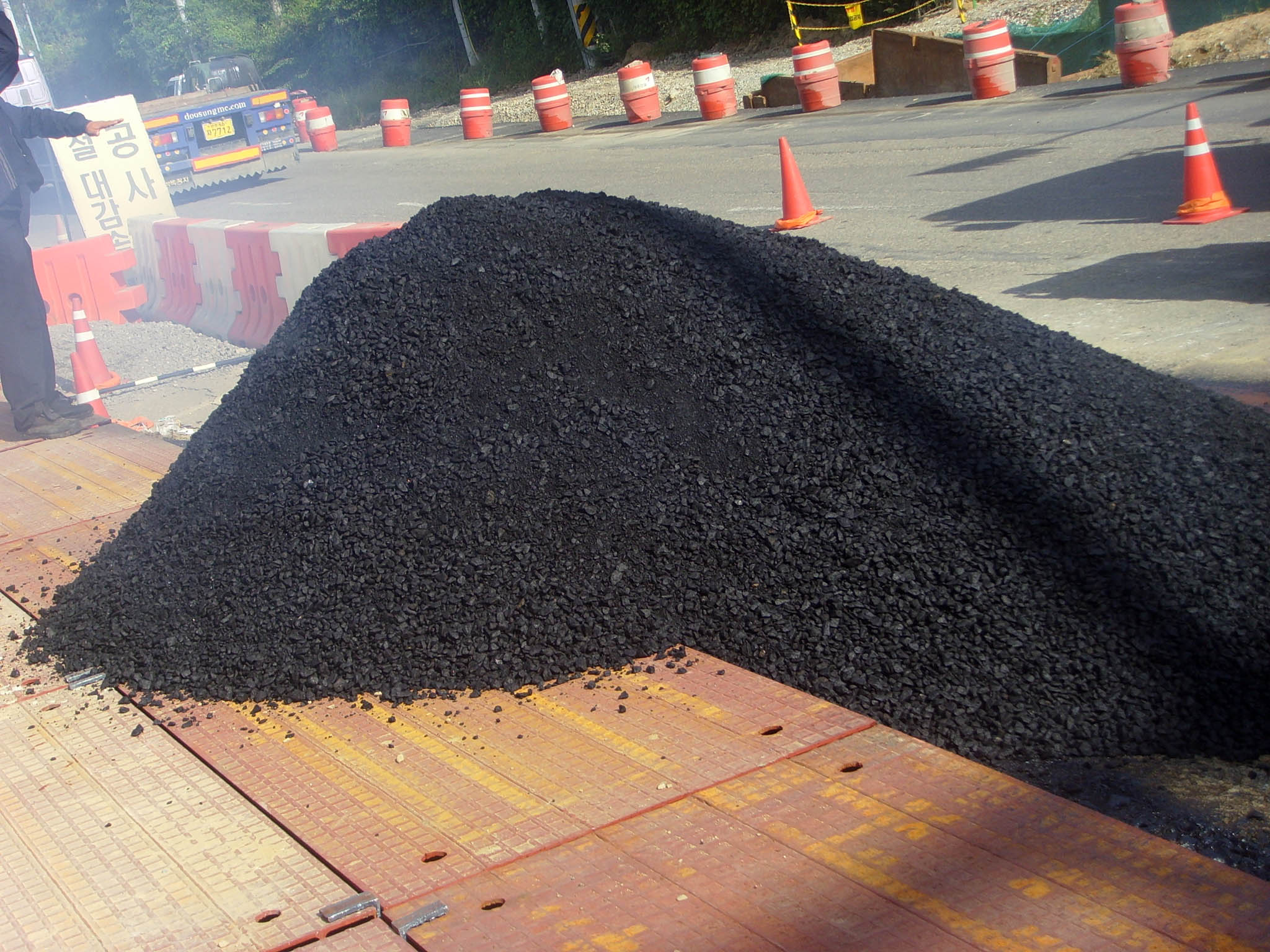
Pile of asphalt-covered aggregate for formation into asphalt concrete
