= Painting in Ancient Egypt =

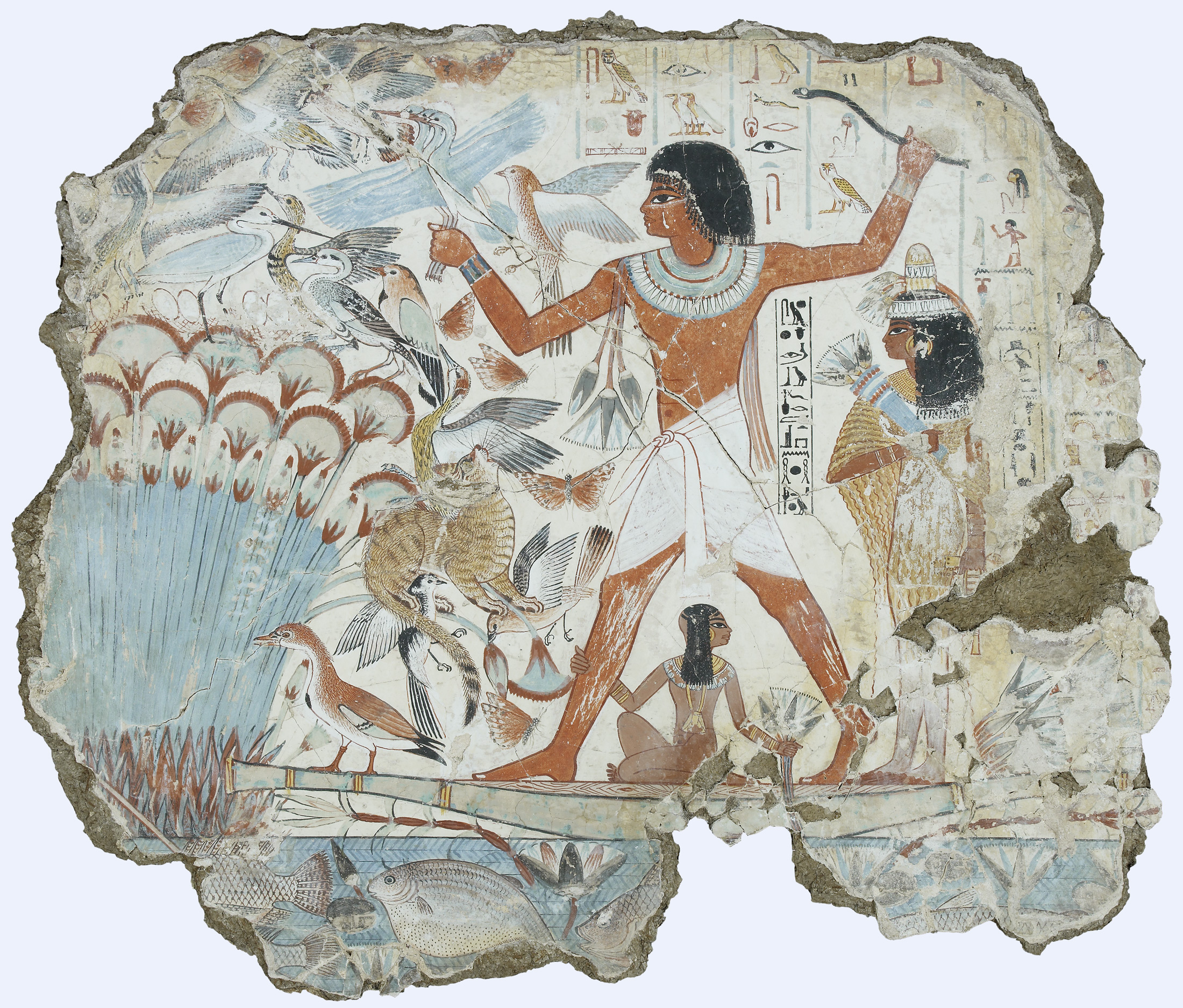
Tomb of Nebamun, Thebes

Painting in ancient Egypt is an important field of Egyptian art that extends from Prehistoric Egypt to the prohibition by Christianity of the polytheistic religion of ancient Egypt (Roman period of Egypt) which profoundly influenced the art of this period. Throughout the history of ancient Egypt, painting remained, for aesthetic and religious reasons, closely linked to sculpture: bas-reliefs are generally painted, as are statues. However, there are many examples of wall paintings without relief, whether from the Old (the Meidum Geese for example) or from the New Kingdom (the tombs of the Theban necropolis in particular).

Ancient Egypt, a civilization with very strong traditions of architecture and sculpture (both originally painted in bright colours) also had many mural paintings in temples and buildings, and painted illustrations on papyrus manuscripts. Egyptian wall painting and decorative painting is often graphic, sometimes more symbolic than realistic. Egyptian painting depicts figures in bold outline and flat silhouette, in which symmetry is a constant characteristic. Egyptian painting has close connection with its written language – called Egyptian hieroglyphs. Painted symbols are found amongst the first forms of written language. The Egyptians also painted on linen, remnants of which survive today. Ancient Egyptian paintings survived due to the extremely dry climate. The ancient Egyptians created paintings to make the afterlife of the deceased a pleasant place. The themes included journey through the afterworld or their protective deities introducing the deceased to the gods of the underworld. Some examples of such paintings are paintings of the gods and goddesses Ra, Horus, Anubis, Nut, Osiris and Isis. Some tomb paintings show activities that the deceased were involved in when they were alive and wished to carry on doing for eternity. In the New Kingdom and later, the Book of the Dead was buried with the entombed person. It was considered important for an introduction to the afterlife.

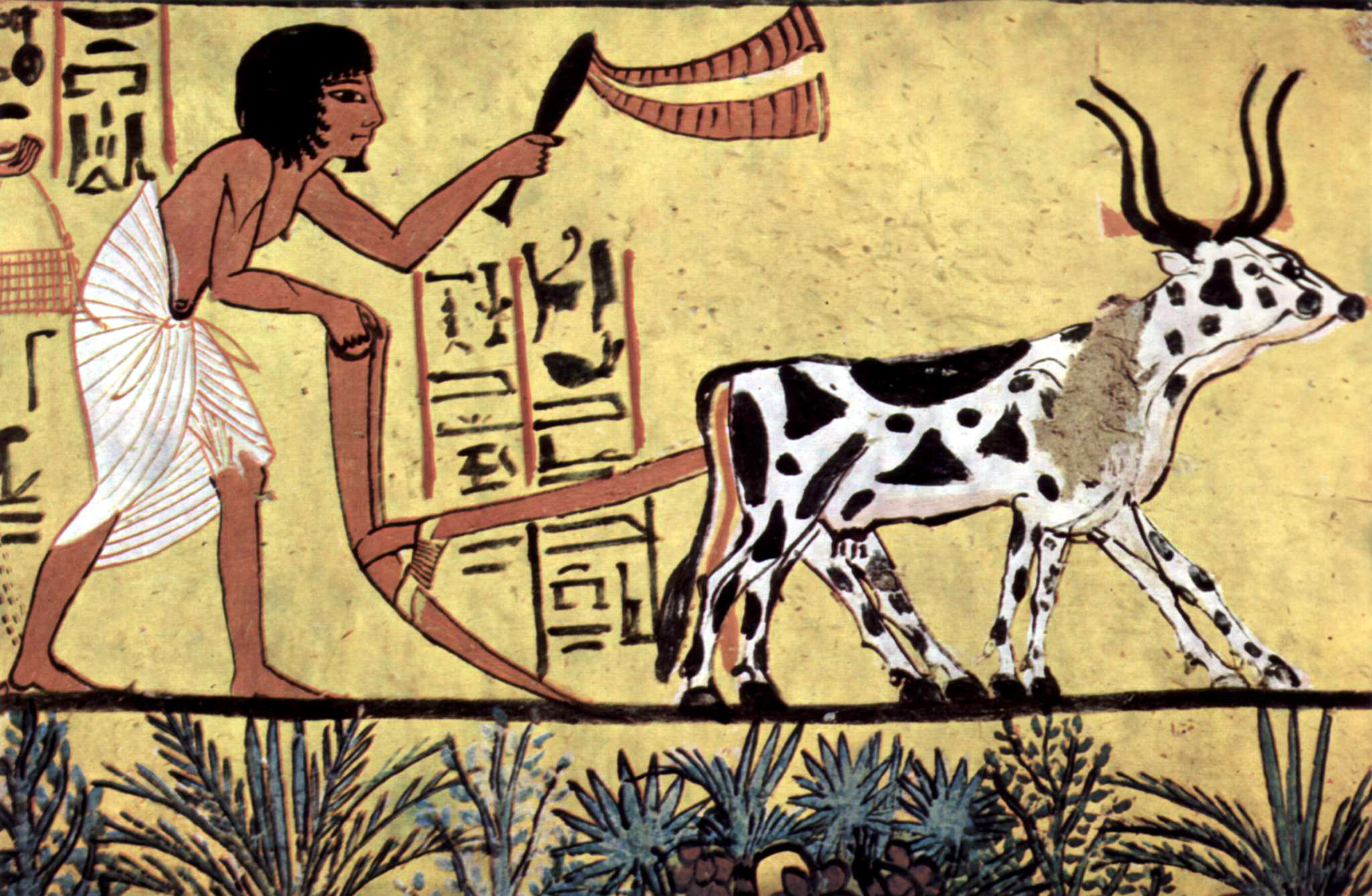
Sennedjem plows his fields with a pair of oxen, c. 1200 BC

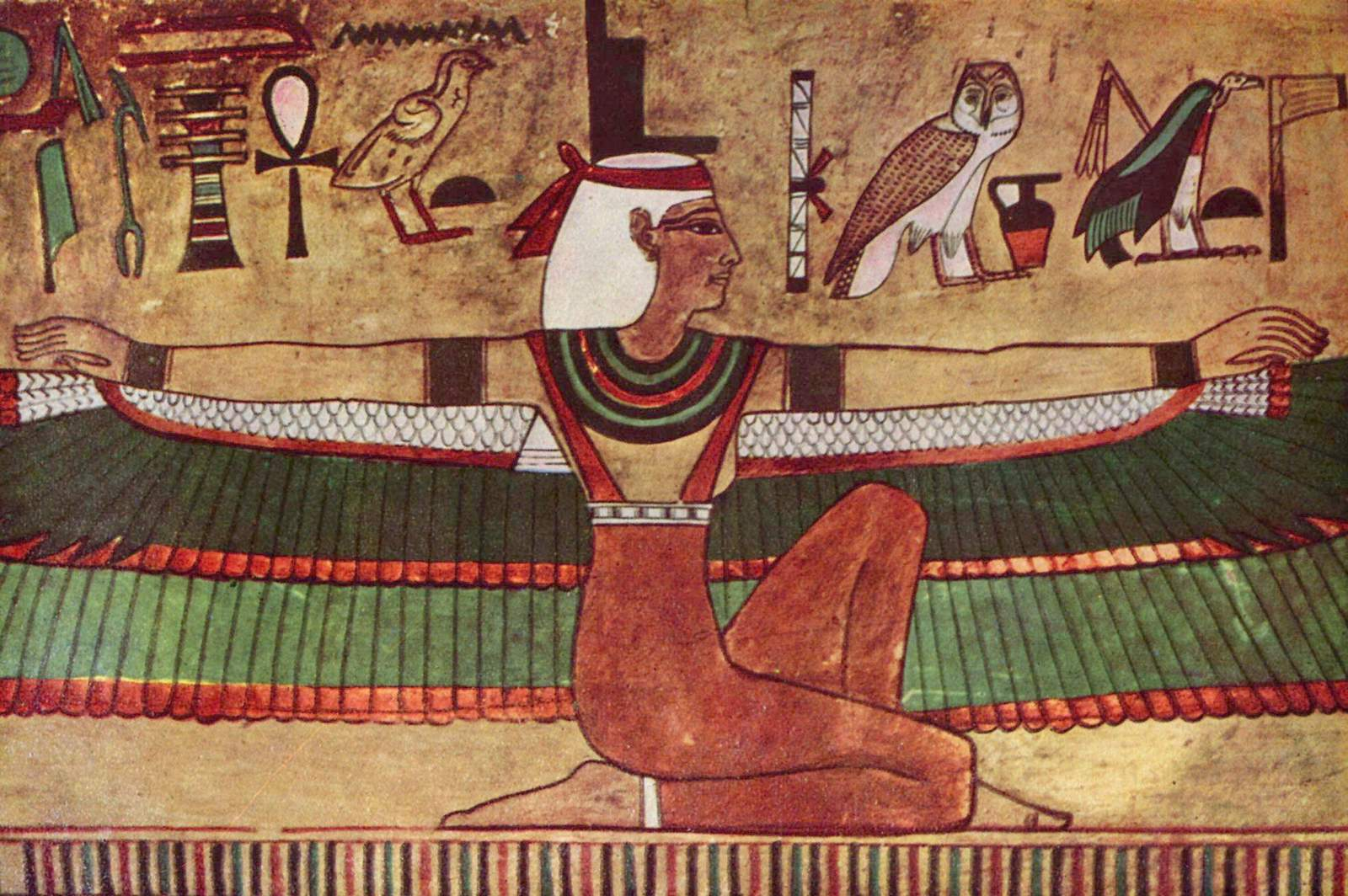
Ancient Egypt,The Goddess Isis, wall painting, c. 1360 BC

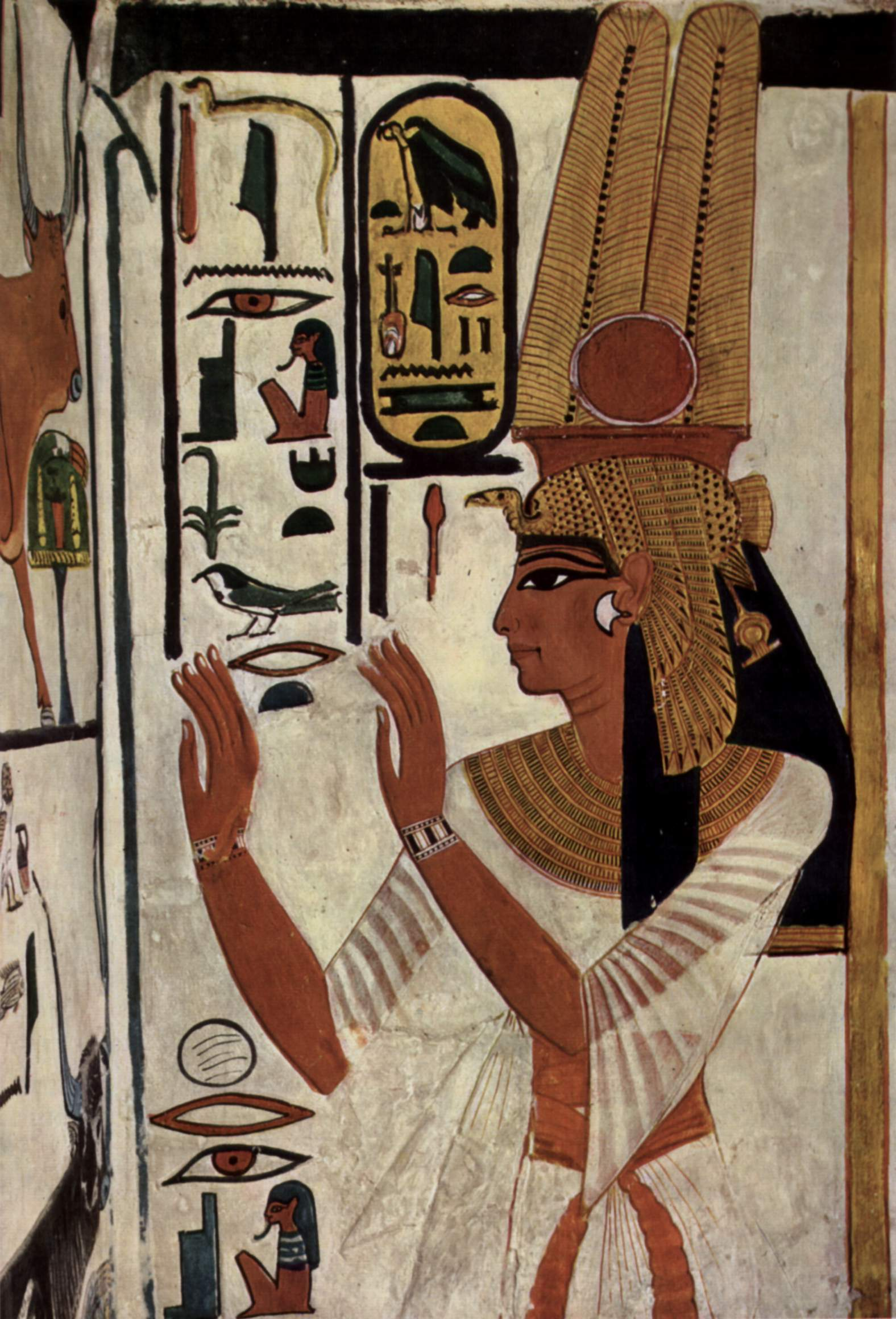
Ancient Egypt, Queen Nefertari

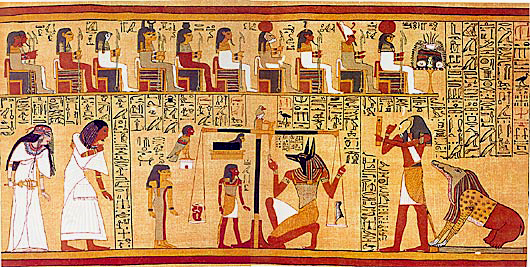
Ancient Egypt, papyrus

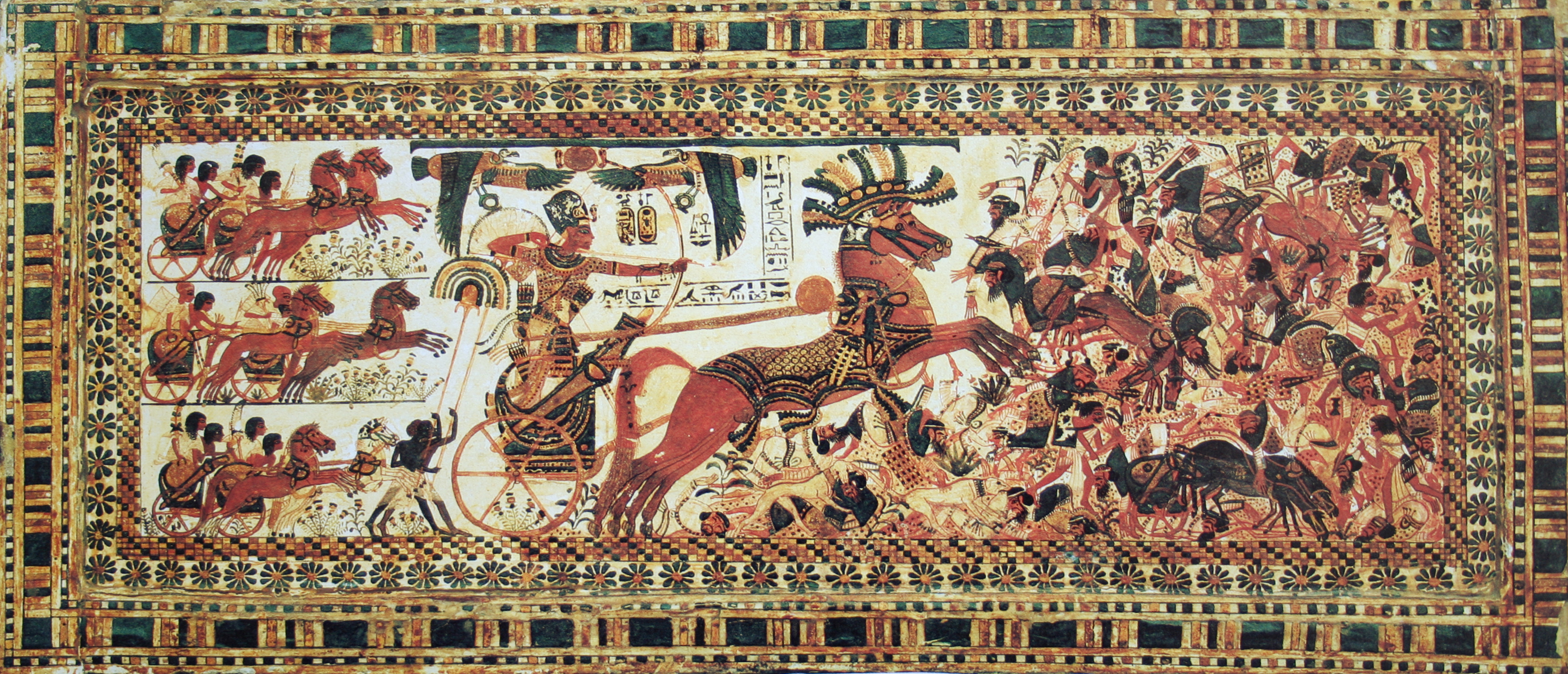
Ancient Egypt

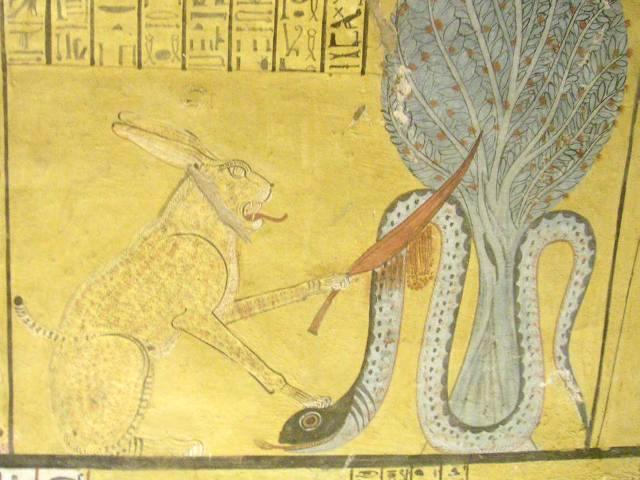
Ancient Egypt

== History ==
=== Old Kingdom ===
During the predynastic period, relief and painting were inseparable; in most cases, the artist used both the brush and the chisel to create a work, although the main purpose of painting was to enhance the sculpture with colours.

=== Middle Kingdom ===
The First Intermediate Period marks the decline of Egyptian art, which only seems to be reborn during the 11th Dynasty, at the end of the second millennium, during the political reunification of the country by the Antef and the Mentuhotep. However, painting will not regain its former splendor.

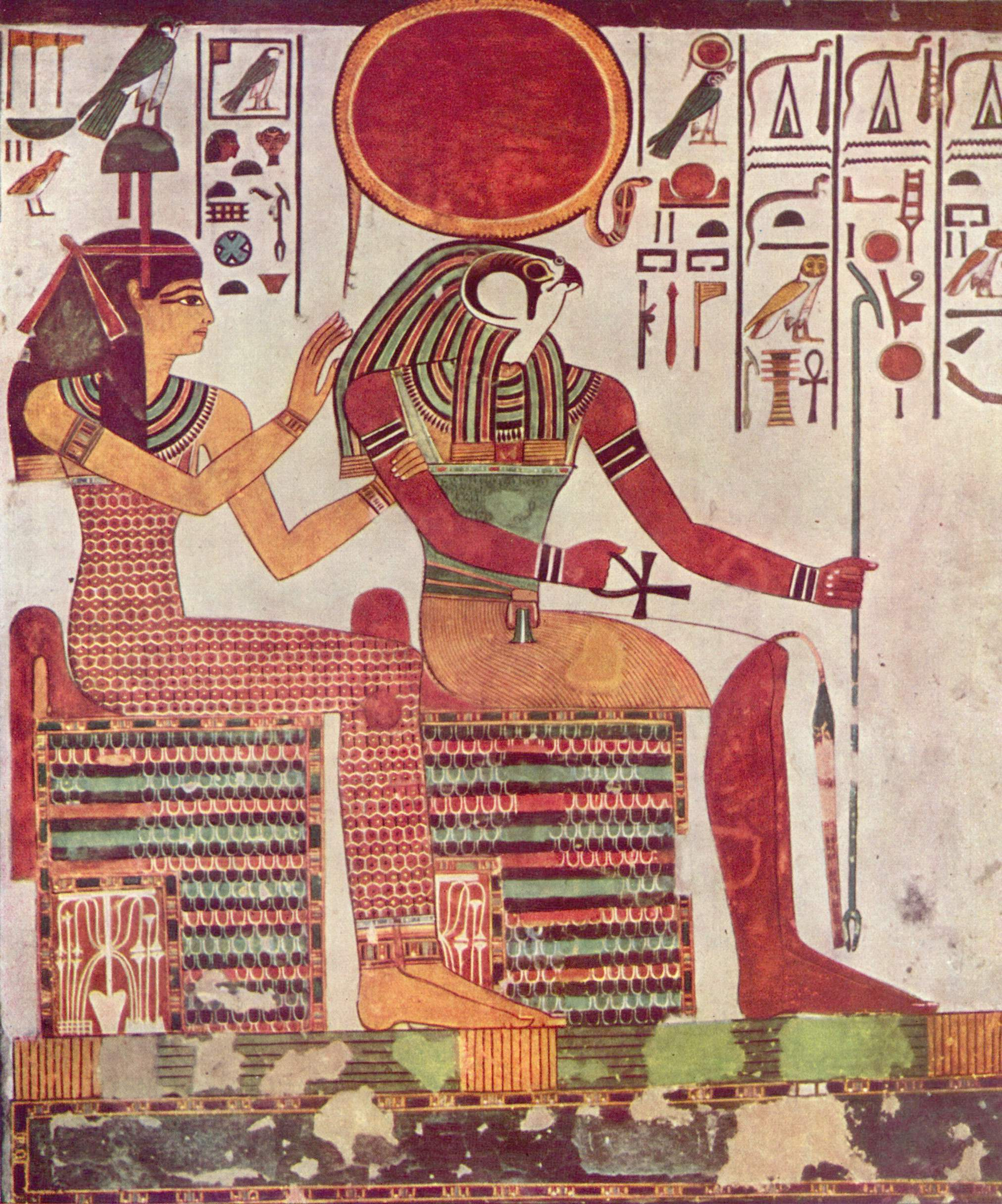
Ra and the Goddess of the West - Tomb of Nefertari

=== New Kingdom ===
As in other artistic fields, the New Kingdom experienced an unparalleled renewal in painting, after the decline in standards of the Second Intermediate Period.

Archaeologists agree that the New Kingdom began with the reign of Ahmose I. The decorations of the Chapel of the Boat at Karnak, in the sanctuary of Amun, and that of the Temple of Millions of Years at Deir el-Bahari, including scenes of the expedition to the marvelous and mysterious Land of Punt, allowed the royal workshops to exercise their talents and achieve a pictographic richness that did not exist until then.
