= Melisande (Stokes) =

Painting by Marianne Stokes

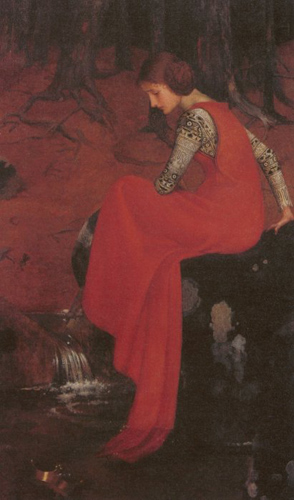
- Artist: Marianne Stokes
- Year: 1895–1898
- Medium: tempera on canvas
- Dimensions: 87 cm × 52 cm (34 in × 20 in)
- Location: Ateneum, Helsinki

Melisande is a painting by the Austrian painter Marianne Stokes. It was painted with tempera on canvas, 1895–1898. It is currently at the Ateneum Art Museum in Helsinki, Finland. It depicts a scene from the play Pelléas and Mélisande by the Belgian playwright Maurice Maeterlinck.
