= Millicent (disambiguation) =

Millicent is a feminine given name. It may also refer to:

- Millicent, South Australia, a town
- Electoral district of Millicent, South Australia, a former Australian electoral district
- Millicent, Alberta, Canada, an unincorporated community
- Millicent Library, Fairhaven, Massachusetts, United States
- Millicent, a micropayment system
- Mount Millicent, a mountain in Utah, US
