= Wax emulsion =

Stable mixtures of waxes in water

Wax emulsions are stable mixtures of one or more waxes in water. Waxes and water are normally immiscible but can be brought together stably by the use of surfactants and a clever preparation process. Strictly speaking a wax emulsion should be called a wax dispersion since the wax is solid at room temperature. However, because the preparation takes place above the melting point of the wax, the actual process is called emulsification, hence the name wax emulsion. In praxis, wax dispersion is used for solvent based systems.

A wide range of emulsions based on different waxes and blends thereof are available, depending on the final application. Waxes that are found in wax emulsions can be of natural or synthetic origin. Common non-fossil natural waxes are carnaubawax, beeswax, candelilla wax or ricebran wax. Paraffin, microcrystalline and montanwax are the most used fossil natural waxes that are found in emulsions. Synthetic waxes that are used include (oxidised) LDPE and HDPE, maleic anhydride grafted polypropylene and Fischer-Tropsch waxes.

A range of different emulsifiers or surfactants are used to emulsify waxes. These can be anionic, cationic or non-ionic in nature. The most common however are fatty alcohol ethoxylates as non-ionic surfactants due to their superb stability against hard water, pH-shock and electrolytes. Some applications demand different emulsifier systems for example anionic surfactants for better hydrophobicity or cationic surfactants for better adhesion to certain materials like textile fibers.

== Applications ==
Wax emulsions are widely used in a variety of technical applications like printing inks & lacquers, leather and textiles, paper, wood, metal, polishes, glass fiber sizing, glass bottle protection among other things. The most important properties that can be improved by the addition of wax emulsions are matting & gloss, hydrophobicity, soft touch, abrasion & rub resistance, scratch resistance, release, corrosion protection and anti-blocking.

Emulsions based on natural waxes are used for coating fruits and candies and crop protection. Synthetic wax based emulsions are often used in food packaging.

Wax emulsions based on beeswax, carnauba wax and paraffin wax are used in creams and ointments.

The emergence of soybean waxes with varying properties and melt points has led to the use of vegetable wax emulsions in applications such as paper coatings, paint and ink additives, and even wet sizing for pulp and paper applications. These wax emulsions can be formulated to deliver some of the same properties that petroleum-based wax emulsions deliver, but offer advantages of being a green product and offer more consistent availability.
