= Emiliano =

Emiliano is a male given name. Notable people with the name include:

== A–C ==
- Emiliano Abeyta (1911–1981), Pueblo-American painter
- Emiliano Agüero (born 1995), Argentine footballer
- Emiliano Aguirre (1925–2021), Spanish paleontologist
- Emiliano Albín (born 1989), Uruguayan footballer
- Emiliano Alfaro (born 1988), Uruguayan footballer
- Emiliano Álvarez (1912–1987), Spanish cyclist
- Emiliano Amor (born 1995), Argentine footballer
- Emiliano Ancheta (born 1999), Uruguayan footballer
- Emiliano Armenteros (born 1986), Argentine footballer
- Emiliano Astorga (born 1960), Chilean football manager and former player
- Emiliano Barrera (born 1981), Argentine football manager and former player
- Emiliano Bergamaschi (born 1976), Argentine rugby union coach and former player
- Emiliano Bigica (born 1973), Italian footballer
- Emiliano Boffelli (born 1995), Argentine rugby union player
- Emiliano Bogado (born 1997), Argentine footballer
- Emiliano Bolongaita, Australian academic
- Emiliano Bombini (1543–1592), Italian Roman Catholic prelate, Bishop of Umbriatico
- Emiliano Bonazzoli (born 1979), Italian footballer
- Emiliano Bonfigli (born 1989), Argentine footballer
- Emiliano Brembilla (born 1978), Italian swimmer
- Emiliano Brienza (born 2002), Mexican footballer
- Emiliano Buale (born 1969), Equatoguinean middle-distance runner
- Emiliano Buendía (born 1996), Argentine footballer
- Emiliano Caffera (born 1978), Uruguayan rugby union coach and former player
- Emiliano Caffini (born 1989), Italian rugby union player
- Emiliano Camargo (1917–2007), Colombian épée and foil fencer
- Emiliano Ceccatelli (born 1978), Italian lightweight rower
- Emiliano Çela (born 1985), Albanian football coach and former player
- Emiliano Chamorro Vargas (1871–1966), Nicaraguan military figure and politician, President of Nicaragua 1917–1921 and 1926
- Emiliano Contreras (born 1994), Argentine cyclist
- Emiliano Cotelo (born 1958), Uruguayan journalist and radio personality

== D–L ==
- Emiliano Dei (born 1971), Italian footballer
- Emiliano Di Cavalcanti (1897–1976), Brazilian painter
- Emiliano Díaz (born 1982), Italian footballer
- Emiliano Díez (born 1953), Cuban-American actor
- Emiliano Dudar (born 1981), Argentine footballer
- Emiliano Dumestre (born 1987), Uruguayan rower
- Emiliano Ellacopulos (born 1992), Greek-Argentine footballer
- Emiliano Endrizzi (born 1994), Argentine footballer
- Emiliano Fenu (born 1977), Italian politician
- Emiliano R. Fernández (1894–1949), Paraguayan poet, musician, and soldier
- Emiliano Figueroa (1866–1931), President of Chile 1925–1927
- Emiliano Franco (born 1994), Spanish-Argentine footballer
- Emiliano Fruto (born 1984), Colombian Major League Baseball pitcher
- Emiliano Fusco (born 1986), Argentine footballer
- Emiliano García (born 2003), Mexican footballer
- Emiliano García-Page (born 1968), Spanish politician
- Emiliano Garré (born 1981), Argentine footballer
- Emiliano Ghan (born 1995), Uruguayan footballer
- Emiliano Rudolf Giambelli (born 1989), stage name Emis Killa, Italian rapper
- Emiliano Giron (born 1972), Dominican baseball pitcher
- Emiliano Gómez (born 2001), Uruguayan footballer
- Emiliano González (disambiguation), multiple people
- Emiliano Grillo (born 1992), Argentine golfer
- Emiliano Ibarra (born 1982), Argentine cyclist
- Emiliano Insúa (born 1989), Argentine footballer
- Emiliano Landolina (born 1986), Italian footballer
- Emiliano Lasa (born 1990), Uruguayan long jumper
- Emiliano Lauzi (born 1994), Italian snowboarder

== M–R ==
- Emiliano Madriz (c. 1800–1845), Nicaraguan lawyer and politician
- Emiliano Marcondes (born 1995), Danish footballer
- Emiliano Marsili (born 1976), Italian boxer
- Emiliano Martínez (born 1992), Argentine football goalkeeper
- Emiliano Martínez (footballer, born 1999), Uruguayan football midfielder
- Emiliano Mascetti (1943–2022), Italian footballer and football executive
- Emiliano Massa (born 1988), Argentine tennis player
- Emiliano Massimo (born 1989), Italian footballer
- Emiliano Mayola (born 1987), Argentine footballer
- Emiliano Melis (born 1979), Italian footballer
- Emiliano Méndez (born 1989), Argentine footballer
- Emiliano Mercado del Toro (1891–2007), Puerto Rican military veteran who was the world's oldest person
- Emiliano Esono Michá, Equatoguinean political activist
- Emiliano Mondonico (1947–2018), Italian footballer and coach
- Emiliano Monge (born 1978), Mexican short story writer and novelist
- Emiliano Morbidelli (born 1977) Italian Vatican City long-distance runner
- Emiliano Moretti (born 1981), Italian footballer
- Emiliano Morlans (born 1952), Spanish cross-country skier
- Emiliano Mozzone (born 1998), Uruguayan footballer
- Emiliano Mundrucu (1791–1863), Brazilian soldier, abolitionist, and civil rights activist
- Emiliano Mutti (born 1933), Italian geologist
- Emiliano Ortega (born 1937), Chilean politician
- Emiliano Ozuna (born 1996), Argentine footballer
- Emiliano Papa (born 1982), Argentine footballer
- Emiliano Pattarello (born 1999), Italian footballer
- Emiliano Pedreira (born 1985), Argentine footballer
- Emiliano Pedrozo (born 1972), Argentine-born Salvadoran football manager and former player
- Emiliano Piedra (1931–1991), Spanish film producer
- Emiliano Pizzoli (born 1974), Italian hurdler
- Emiliano Purita (born 1997), Argentine footballer
- Emiliano Qirngnuq, Canadian politician
- Emiliano Ramos (born 1979), Mexican left-wing politician
- Emiliano Reali (born 1976), Italian writer and blogger
- Emiliano Redondo (1937–2014), Spanish actor
- Emiliano Revilla (born 1928), Spanish industrialist and kidnapping victim
- Emiliano Rey (born 1975), Argentine footballer
- Emiliano Reyes (born 1984), American business executive and humanitarian activist
- Emiliano Rigoni (born 1993), Argentine footballer
- Emiliano Rodríguez (born 1937), Spanish basketball player
- Emiliano Romay (born 1977), Argentine footballer
- Emiliano Romero (disambiguation), multiple people
- Emiliano Rodolfo Rosales-Birou (born 1990), alias Chuggaaconroy, American YouTuber and Let's Player

== S–Z ==
- Emiliano Saguier (fl. 1960s), Paraguayan chess player
- Emiliano Sala (1990–2019), Argentine footballer
- Emiliano Salinas (born 1976), Mexican venture capitalist and businessman
- Emiliano Salvetti (born 1974), Italian footballer
- Emiliano Sanchez (born 1977), Argentine speedway rider
- Emiliano Sciarra (born 1971), Italian board-, card-, and video-game designer
- Emiliano Serres (born 1997), Uruguayan basketballer
- Emiliano Spataro (born 1976), Argentine racing driver
- Emiliano Storani (born 1993), Italian footballer
- Emiliano Strappini (born 1986), Argentine footballer
- Emiliano Tabone (born 1991), Argentine footballer
- Emiliano Tade (born 1988), Argentine footballer
- Emiliano Tarana (born 1979), Italian footballer
- Emiliano Tardif (1928–1999), Canadian Roman Catholic priest and missionary
- Emiliano Té (born 1983), Bissau-Guinean footballer
- Emiliano Tellechea (born 1987), Uruguayan footballer
- Emiliano Teodo (born 2001), Dominican baseball player
- Emiliano Terzaghi (born 1993), Argentine footballer
- Emiliano Testini (born 1977), Italian footballer
- Emiliano Torres (born 1971), Argentine film director, screenwriter, and producer
- Emiliano Tortolano (born 1990), Italian footballer
- Emiliano Vecchio (born 1988), Argentine footballer
- Emiliano Velázquez (born 1994), Uruguayan footballer
- Emiliano Velázquez Esquivel (born 1964), Mexican politician
- Emiliano Veliaj (born 1985), Albanian footballer
- Emiliano Villar (born 1999), Uruguayan footballer
- Emiliano Viviano (born 1985), Italian footballer
- Emiliano Yacobitti (born 1975), Argentine politician
- Emiliano Zapata (1879–1919), Mexican revolutionary
- Emiliano Elias Zapata (born 1986), Argentine footballer
- Emiliano Zuleta (1912–2005), Colombian vallenato composer, accordion player, and singer
- Emiliano Zurita, Mexican actor, writer and producer

== See also ==
- Emiliano Zapata (disambiguation)
- Emilia (given name)
- Emilian (disambiguation)
- Emiliana (disambiguation)
