= Emily (disambiguation) =

Emily is a female given name.

Emily may also refer to:

== Film ==
- Emily (1976 film), a British film
- Emily (2017 film), an American drama film
- Emily (2022 film), a film about Emily Brontë

== Television ==
=== Episodes ===
- "Emily", an episode of the American teen drama Beverly Hills, 90210
- "Emily", an episode of the American Western series Bonanza
- "Emily", an episode of the British children's anthology series Dramarama
- "Emily", an episode of the American sitcom Empty Nest
- "Emily", the ninth episode of the American science fiction romance series Journeyman
- "Emily" (Shameless), an episode of the American comedy-drama series Shameless
- "Emily" (Skins), an episode of the British teen drama Skins
- "Emily", the last episode of the British drama series The New Avengers
- "Emily", an episode of the British children's series The Return of the Antelope
- "Emily" (The X-Files), a two-part episode of the American science fiction series The X-Files

=== Shows ===
- Emily (TV series), a French cartoon series

== Music ==
- Emily Records (later Emily Productions), founded by Anita O'Day
- "Emily" (1964 song), title song by Johnny Mandel and Johnny Mercer to the film The Americanization of Emily
- "Emily" (Dave Koz song), a 1990 song on Dave Koz's album Dave Koz
- "Emily" (Bowling for Soup song), a 2003 song on Bowling for Soup's album Drunk Enough to Dance
- Emily, an EP by Lower Than Atlantis
- "Emily", a 2009 song on Clan of Xymox's album In Love We Trust
- "Emily", a 2019 song on Tourist's album Everyday
- "Emily", a song on Adam Green's album Gemstones
- "Emily", a song on Alice in Videoland's album Outrageous!
- "Emily", a song on Elton John's album The One
- "Emily", a song on Asian versions of Feeder's album Comfort in Sound
- "Emily", a song on From First to Last's album Dear Diary, My Teen Angst Has a Bodycount
- "Emily", a song on Kelly Jones' album Only the Names Have Been Changed
- "Emily", a song by Lower Than Atlantis's album Lower Than Atlantis
- "Emily", a song on Joanna Newsom's album Ys
- "Emily", a song on Manic Street Preachers' album Lifeblood
- "Emily", a song on Michael W. Smith's album Go West Young Man
- "Emily", a song on Mika's album The Origin of Love
- "Emily", a song on The Mowgli's album Waiting for the Dawn
- "Emily", a song on Since October's album This Is My Heart
- "Emily", a song by Stephen Fretwell, on The Acoustic Album
- "Emily", a song by Inzie featuring Owl City

== Places ==
- Emily Township, Ontario, Canada, a former municipality
- Emily Provincial Park, Ontario, Canada - see List of provincial parks of Central Ontario
- Emily, Minnesota, United States, a city
- Mount Emily, Oregon, United States
- Lake Emily (disambiguation), various lakes in the United States and New Zealand (as well as one ghost town)

== Other uses ==
- List of storms named Emily, various tropical cyclones
- Kawanishi H8K, Allied identification code Emily, a World War II Japanese flying boat
- Emily (cow), a cow that escaped from a slaughterhouse and became a figurehead of animal rights
- E.M.I.L.Y., a robotic device for rescuing swimmers
- Emily (novel), 1975 British novel by Jilly Cooper

== See also ==
- Amelia (disambiguation)
- Amélie, 2001 romantic comedy film
- Emilia (given name)
- Emilian (disambiguation)
- Emiliana (disambiguation)
- Émilie, a French feminine given name
- EMILY's List, political action committee in the United States
- Emly, a village in County Tipperary, Ireland
