= Emiliano Zapata (disambiguation) =

Emiliano Zapata was a leading figure in the Mexican Revolution.

Emiliano Zapata may also refer to:

- Emiliano Zapata (film), a 1970 film
- Emiliano Zapata Municipality (disambiguation), several municipalities in Mexico
- Emiliano Zapata, Aguascalientes
- Emiliano Zapata, Hidalgo
- Emiliano Zapata, Jalisco
- Emiliano Zapata, Morelos
- Emiliano Zapata, Tabasco
- Emiliano Zapata, Veracruz
- Emiliano Zapata (footballer) (born 1986), Argentinian footballer
