= Tortolano =

Tortolano is an Italian surname. Notable people with the surname include:

- Emiliano Tortolano (born 1990), Italian footballer
- Joe Tortolano (born 1966), Scottish footballer
