= Reali =

Reali is an Italian surname. Notable people with the surname include:

- Antonio Reali (1891–1975), Italian World War I flying ace
- Cristiana Reali (born 1965), French actress
- Emiliano Reali (born 1976), Italian writer
- Ivan Reali (born 1991), Italian footballer
- Mario Reali (1939–2017), Italian poet and writer
- Tony Reali (born 1978), American television host
