= Emiliano Ramos =

Emiliano Ramos may refer to:

- Emiliano Ramos (politician) (born 1979), Mexican politician
- Emiliano Ramos (footballer) (born 2005), Chilean footballer
