= Dos Ríos, Veracruz =

Locality in Veracruz, Mexico

Dos Ríos
- Locality
- Location within Veracruz Location within Mexico
- Coordinates: 19°29′03″N 96°47′58″W
- Country: Mexico
- State: Veracruz
- Municipality: Emiliano Zapata

Area
  - Total: 0.70 km^{2} (0.27 sq mi)
- Elevation: 940 m (3,080 ft)

Population (2020)
  - Total: 1,698
  - Density: 2,400/km^{2} (6,300/sq mi)
- Time zone: UTC-6 (Central)
- Postal code: 91640

Dos Ríos is a locality in the municipality of Emiliano Zapata, Veracruz, Mexico. It is located on the southeastern part of the country, about 77 kilometers northwest of the city of Veracruz. As of the year 2020, it had a total population of 1,698.

== Geography ==
Dos Ríos is situated along Federal Highway 140. It has an average elevation of 940 meters above the sea level.

== Climate ==
Dos Ríos has a humid subtropical climate (Cfa). It sees the most precipitation in September, with an average rainfall of 237 mm; and the least precipitation in February, with an average rainfall of 40 mm.

Climate data for Dos Ríos
Month	Jan	Feb	Mar	Apr	May	Jun	Jul	Aug	Sep	Oct	Nov	Dec	Year
Mean daily maximum °C (°F)	21.2 (70.2)	23.1 (73.6)	25.1 (77.2)	27.4 (81.3)	27.6 (81.7)	26.4 (79.5)	26.2 (79.2)	26.5 (79.7)	25.7 (78.3)	24.6 (76.3)	22.7 (72.9)	21.9 (71.4)	24.9 (76.8)
Daily mean °C (°F)	16.7 (62.1)	18.1 (64.6)	20.0 (68.0)	22.3 (72.1)	23.2 (73.8)	22.7 (72.9)	22.4 (72.3)	22.6 (72.7)	22.2 (72.0)	21.0 (69.8)	18.8 (65.8)	17.5 (63.5)	20.6 (69.1)
Mean daily minimum °C (°F)	13.2 (55.8)	14.3 (57.7)	15.8 (60.4)	18.0 (64.4)	19.3 (66.7)	19.6 (67.3)	19.1 (66.4)	19.4 (66.9)	19.4 (66.9)	18.0 (64.4)	15.5 (59.9)	14.0 (57.2)	17.1 (62.8)
Average rainfall mm (inches)	48 (1.9)	40 (1.6)	60 (2.4)	85 (3.3)	121 (4.8)	232 (9.1)	176 (6.9)	191 (7.5)	237 (9.3)	151 (5.9)	80 (3.1)	42 (1.7)	1,463 (57.5)
Source: Climate-Data.org
