= Jalcomulco =

- Municipality
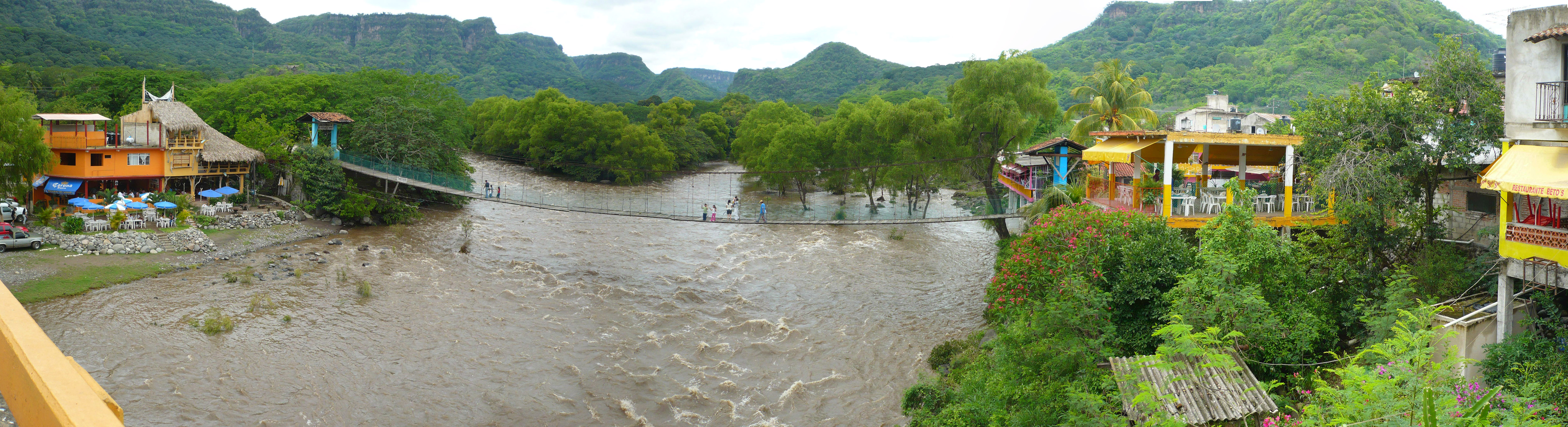
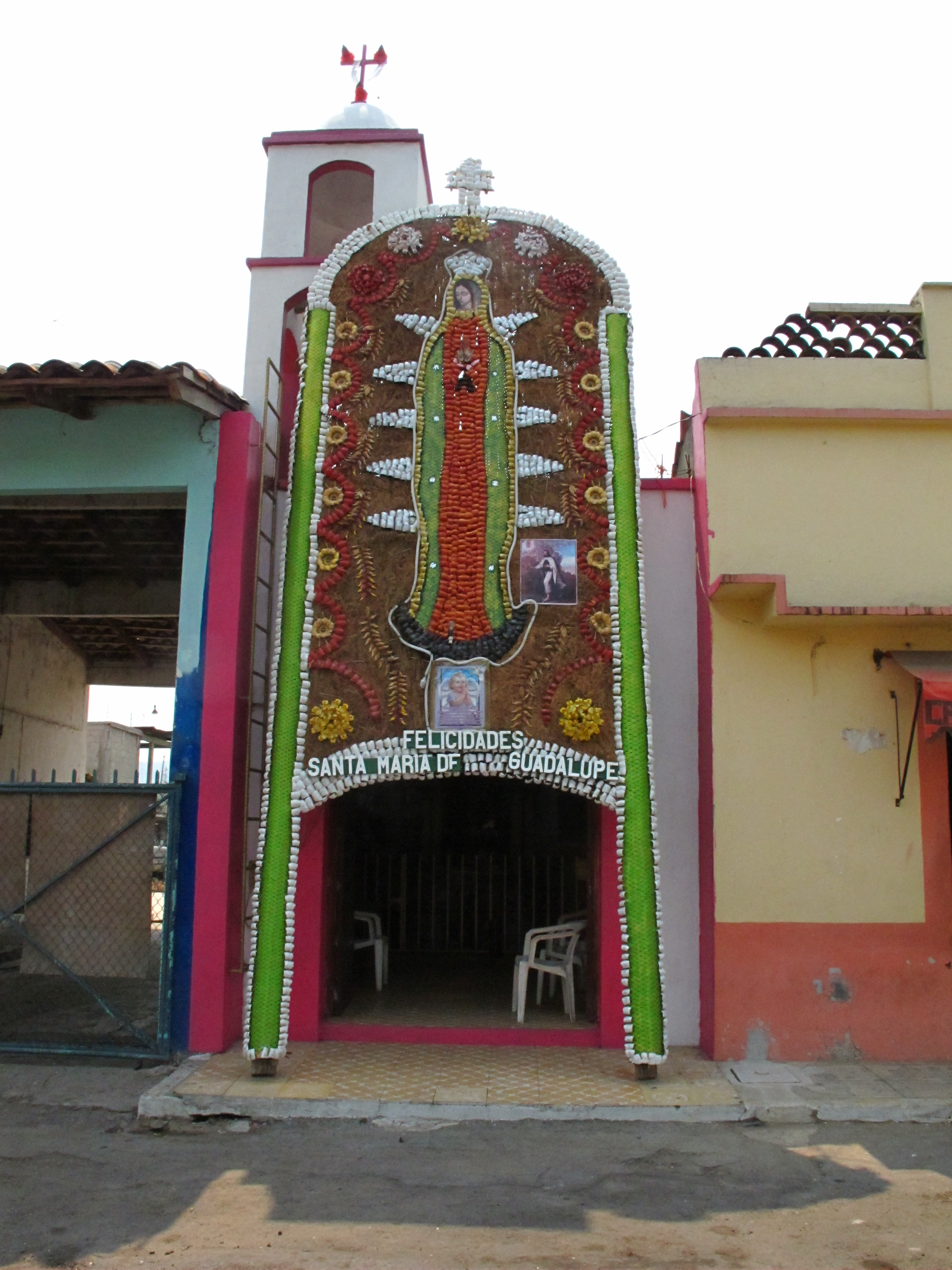
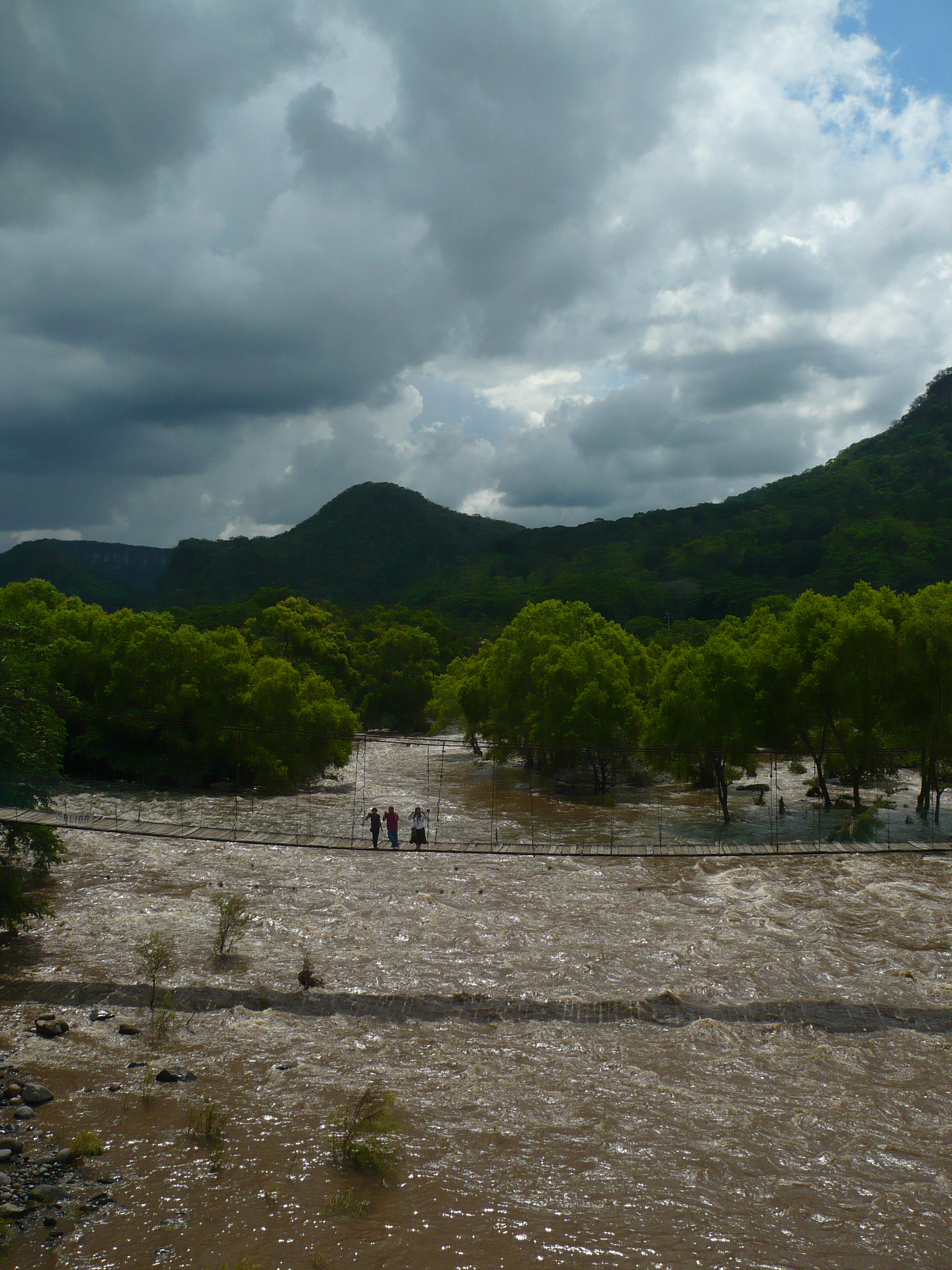
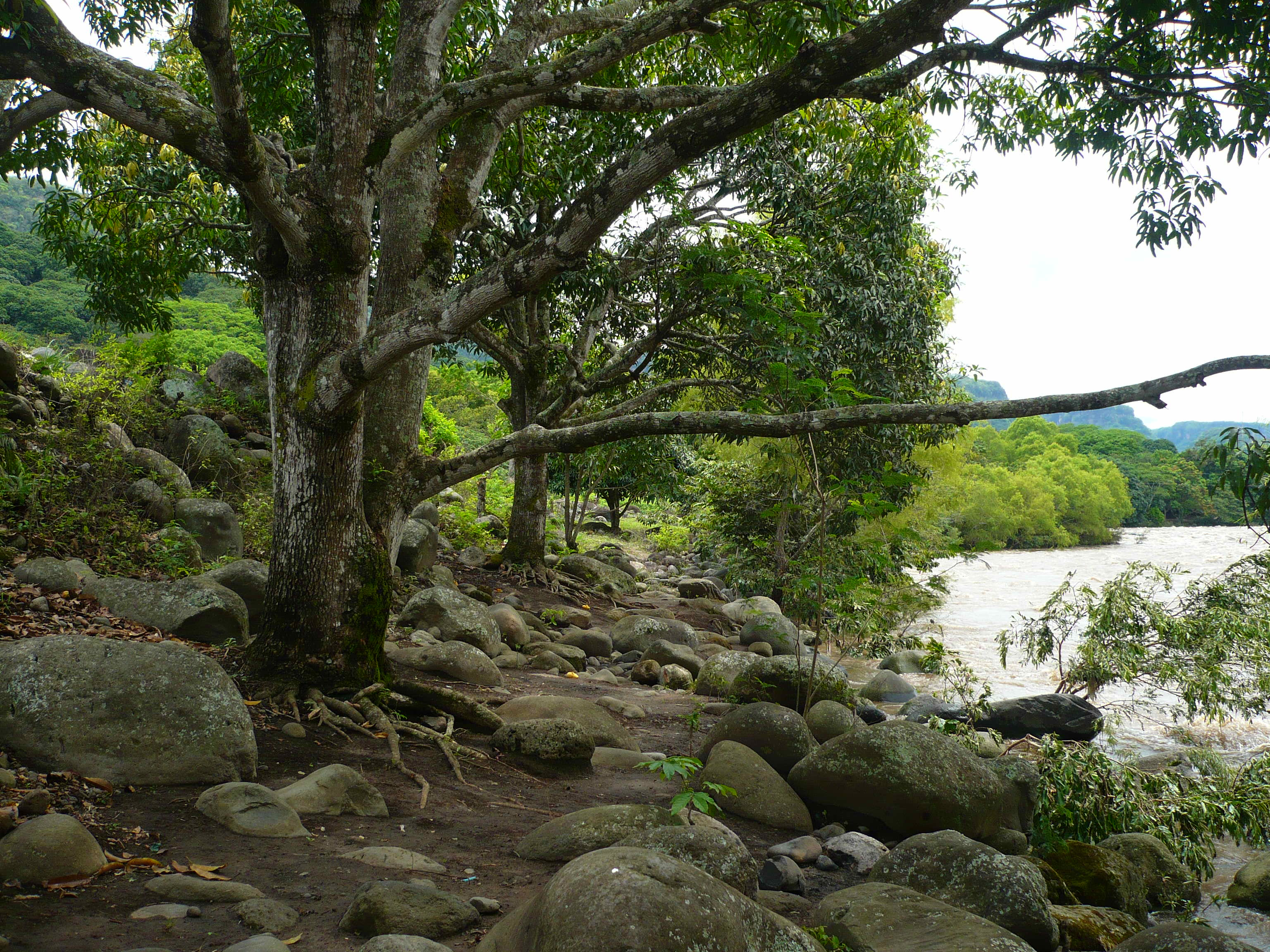
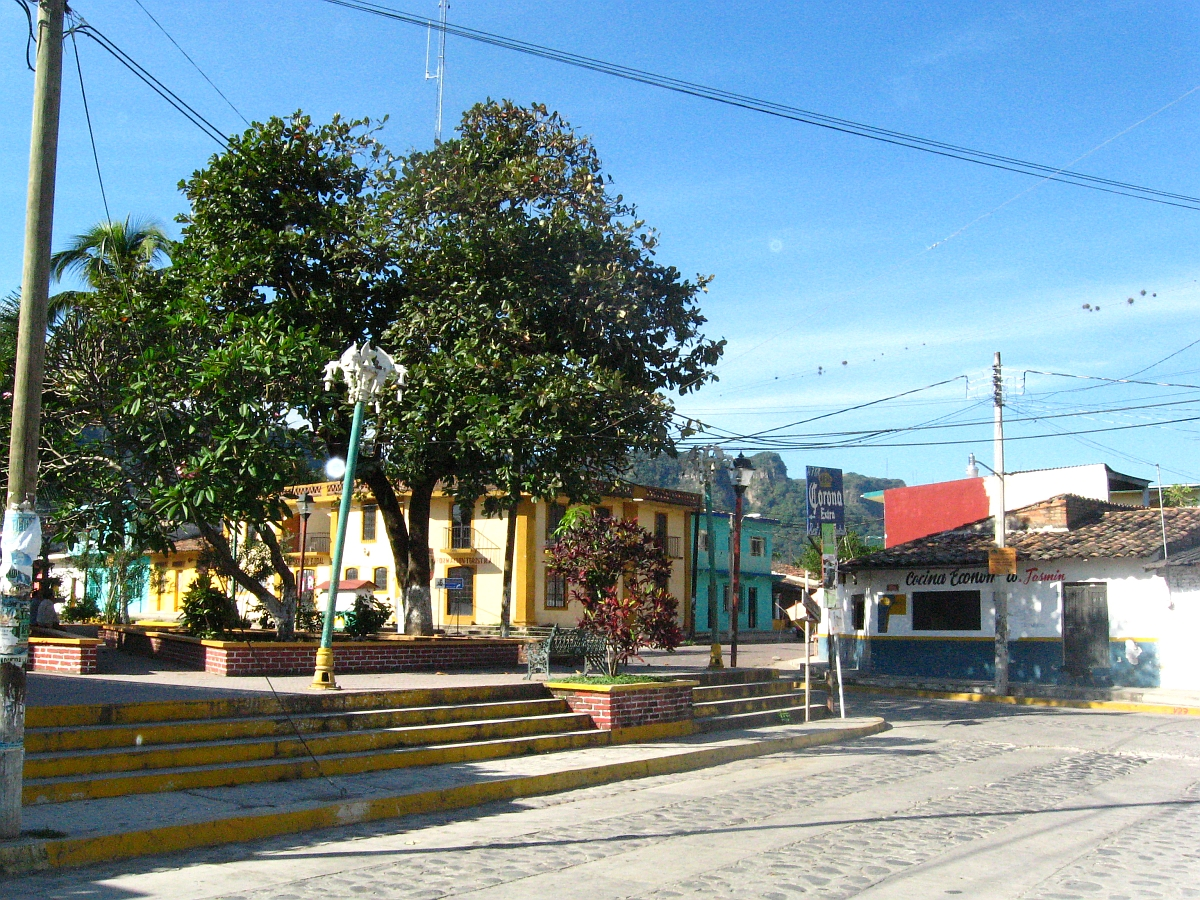
- Top: La Antigua river; Middle: San Juan Bautista Parish, Bridge over Pescados river; Bottom: Jalcomulco landscape, Jalcomulco downtown

- Location in Mexico Jalcomulco (Mexico)
- Coordinates: 19°16′00″N 96°41′00″W
- Country: Mexico
- State: Veracruz
- Region: Capital Region
- Municipal seat and largest town: Jalcomulco

Government
  - Mayor: David Meza Hernández (MC)

Area
  - Total: 72.4 km^{2} (28.0 sq mi)
- Elevation (of seat): 383 m (1,257 ft)

Population (2020)
  - Total: 5,054
  - Density: 69.9/km^{2} (181/sq mi)
  - Seat: 3,150
- Time zone: UTC-6 (Central (US Central))
- Postal code (of seat): 94000
- Website: (in Spanish)

Historical population
Year	Pop.	±%
1995	4,517	—
2000	4,416	−2.2%
2005	4,690	+6.2%
2010	4,940	+5.3%
2015	5,006	+1.3%
2020	5,054	+1.0%

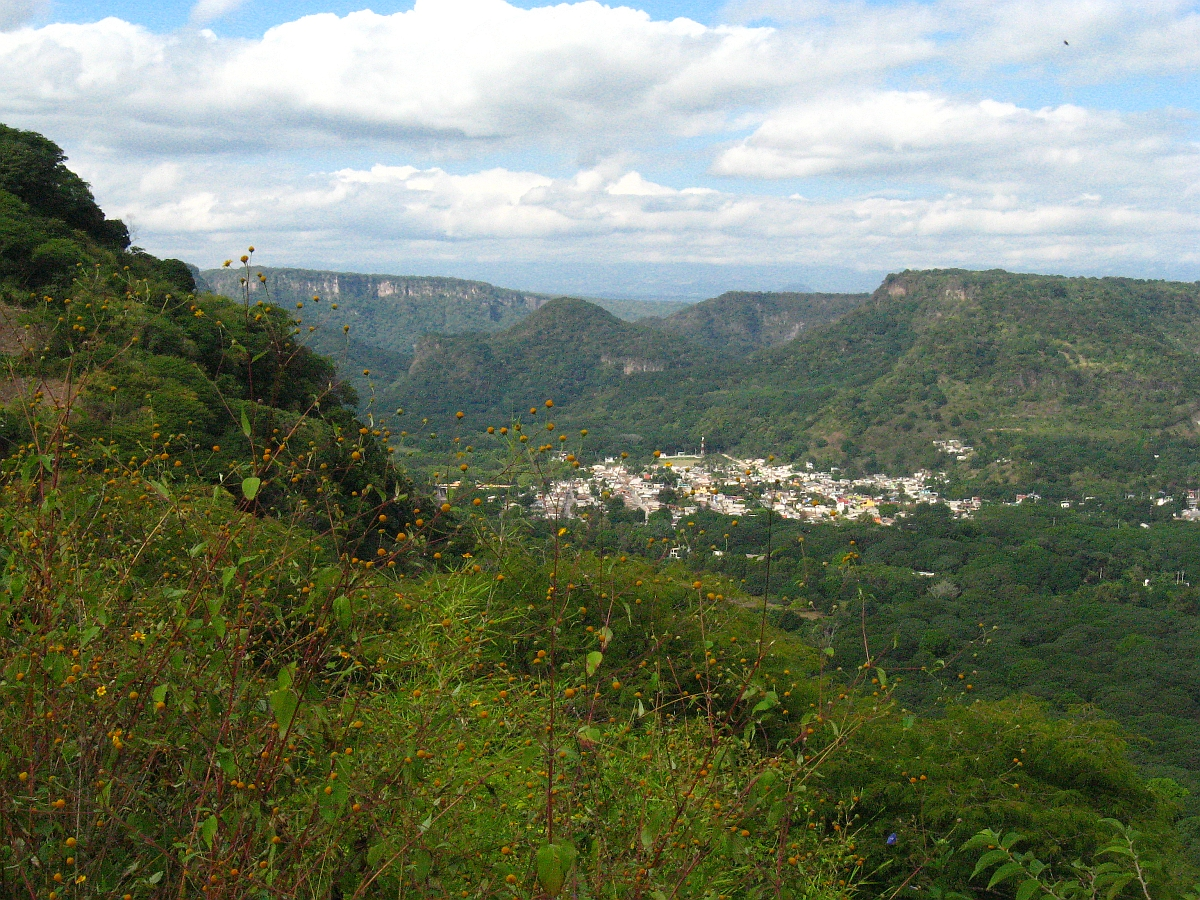
View over Jalcomulco, Veracruz

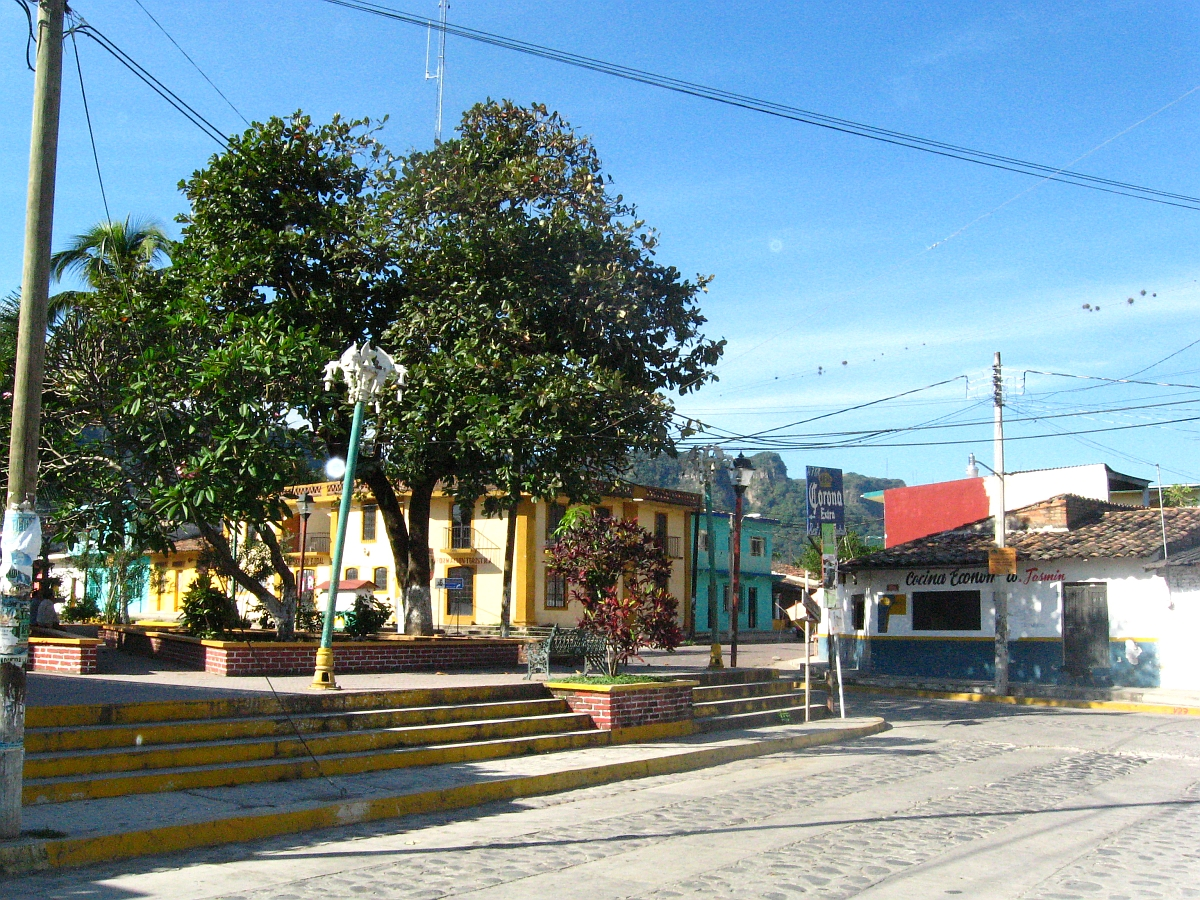
Jalcomulco town centre

Jalcomulco is a municipality in the Mexican state of Veracruz, founded in 1825.

== Geography ==
The municipality is located in the central zone of the state, about 29 km (18 mi) from Xalapa, the state capital and 359 km (223 mi), from Mexico City. It has a land area of 72.4 km^{2}.

The municipality of Jalcomulco is bounded to the north by Emiliano Zapata, to the east by Apazapan, to the south and south-west by Tlaltetela, and to the north-west by Coatepec.

=== Climate ===
The weather in Jalcomulco is warm all year with rain in summer and autumn.

Annual precipitation is 1,125 mm.

The average temperature is 24 °C, (75 °F).

== Demographics ==
As of 2020, the municipality had a population of 5,054 inhabitants in just 4 localities. The localities are Jalcomulco (3,150 hab.), Santa María Tatetla (1,707 hab.), Tacotalpan (153 hab.) and Rivera del Río (44 hab.).

== Economy ==
The region principally produces maize, coffee, sugarcane, and mango. It also produces cattle and poultry.

Since the early 1990s ecotourism has been an important part of the economy of the region, with more than a dozen hotels and professional dealers of adventure travel.

== Culture ==
In May, a celebration takes place in Jalcomulco to honor San Juan Bautista, the Patron saint of the town.

== Sports and activities ==
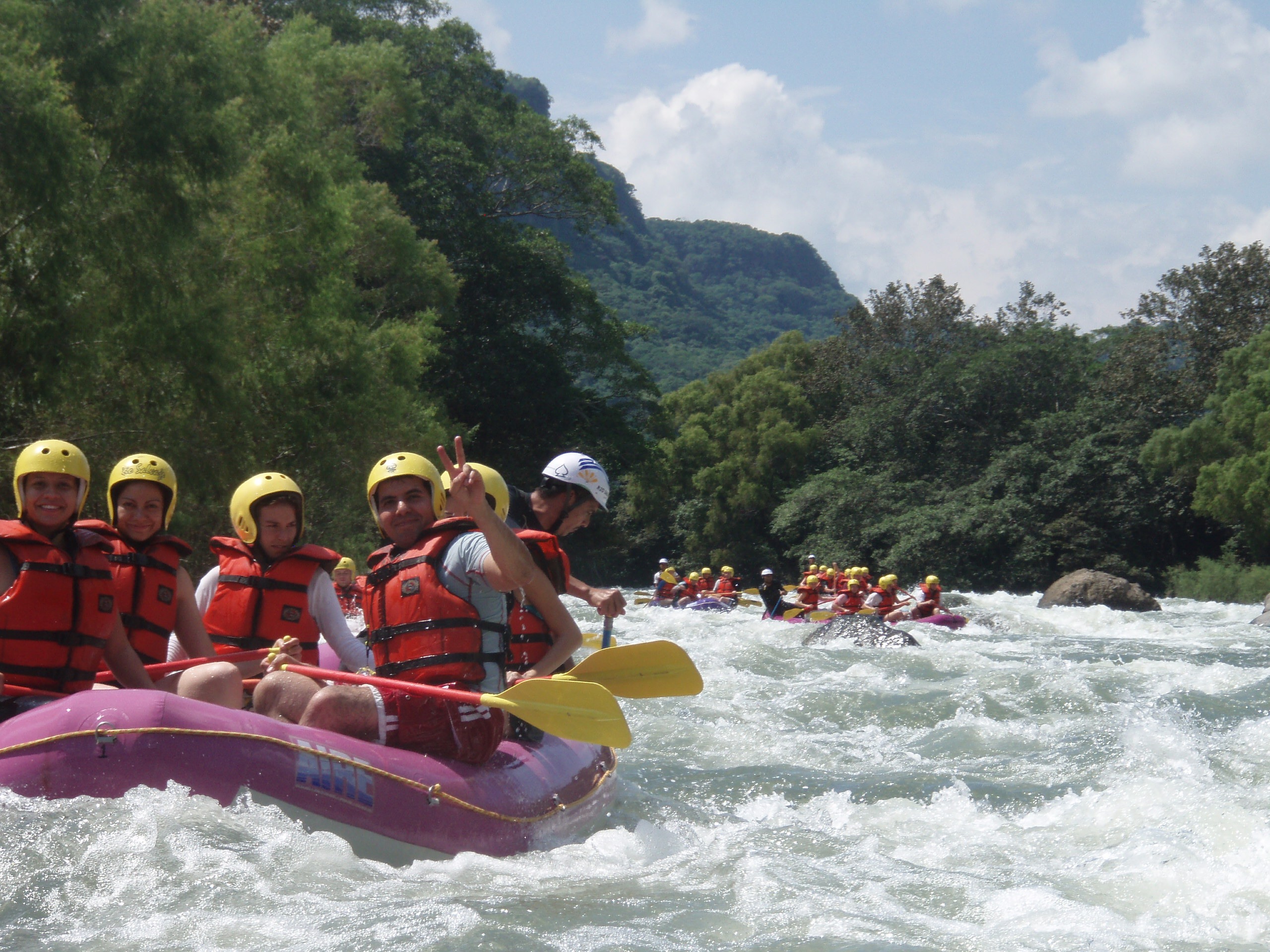
Rafting in Río Antigua

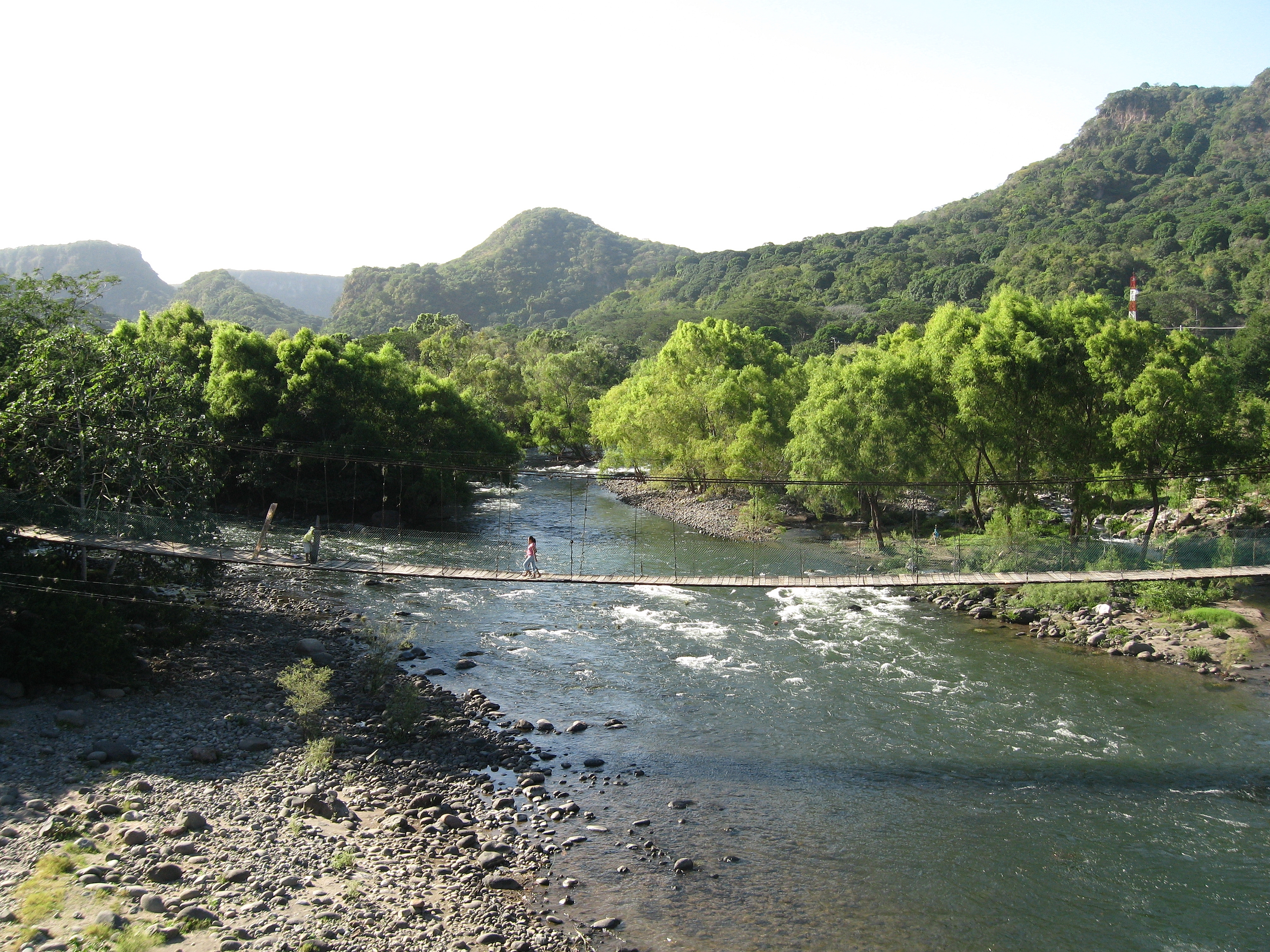
Footbridge across Río Antigua (Río de los Pescados Section), Jalcomulco

The Río de los Pescados section of the Rio Antigua is a whitewater river that flows through the town of Jalcomulco and is commercially rafted.

Other activities to practice in town are rappelling, climbing, hiking, tyrolean crossing, mountain biking, landscape photography, and temazcal.

== Filming location ==
Two-thirds of the scenes of the movie Romancing the Stone (1984) was filmed in this area.
