= Coatepec, Veracruz =

Coatepec
- City and municipality
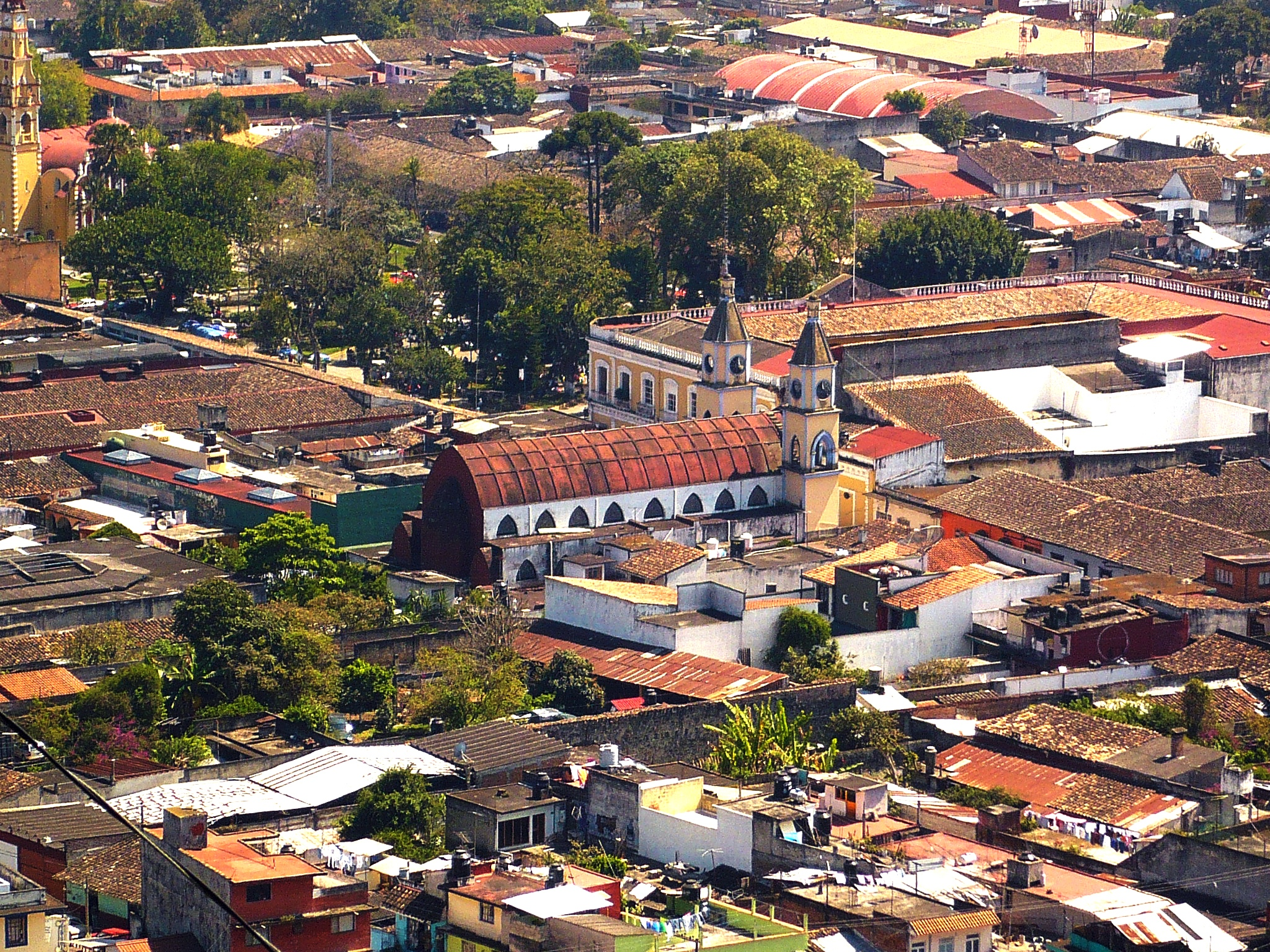
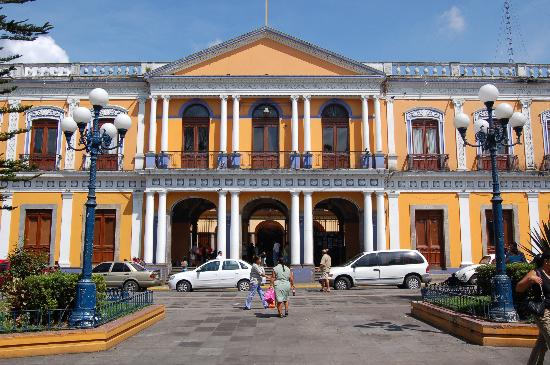
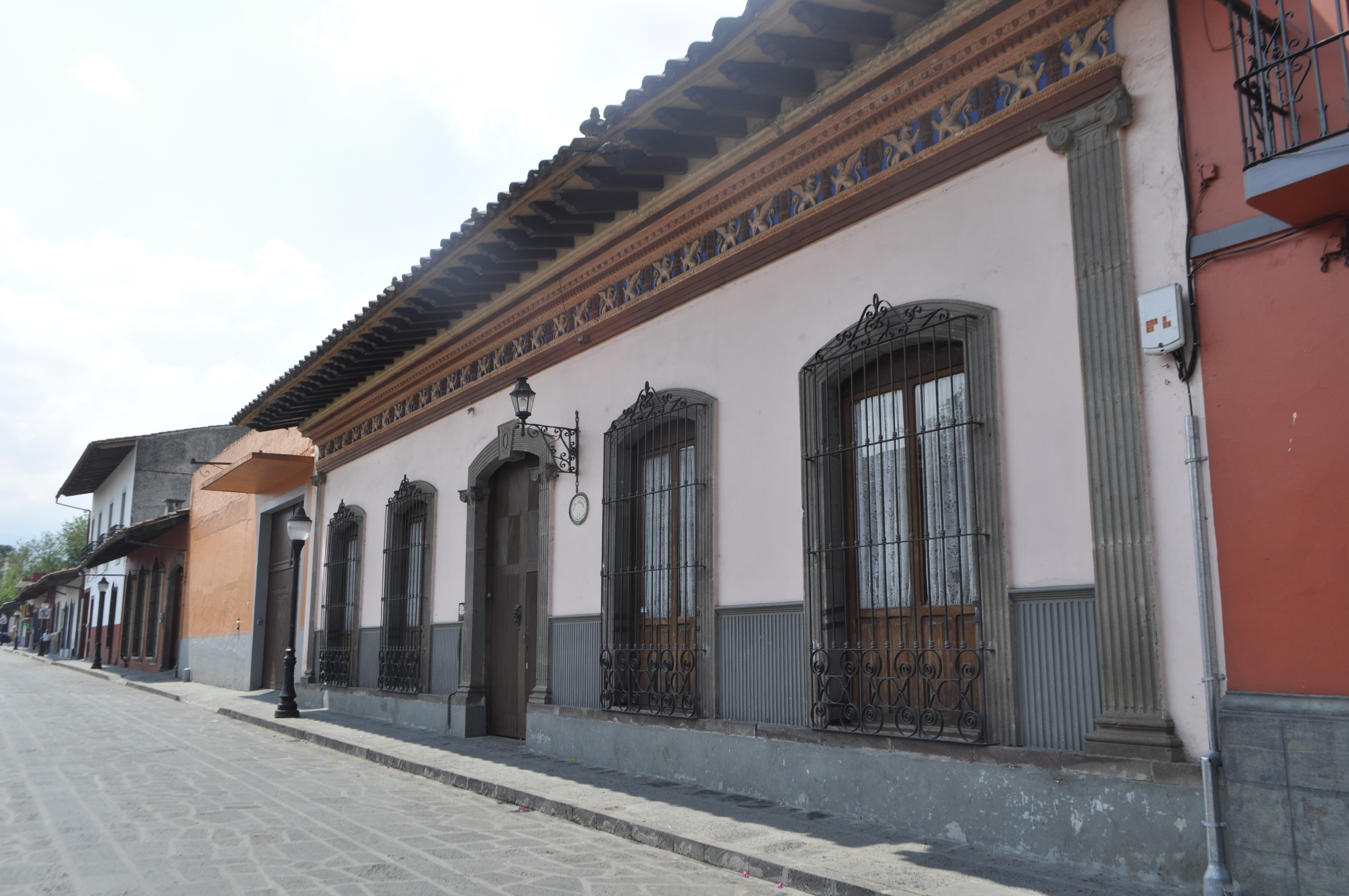
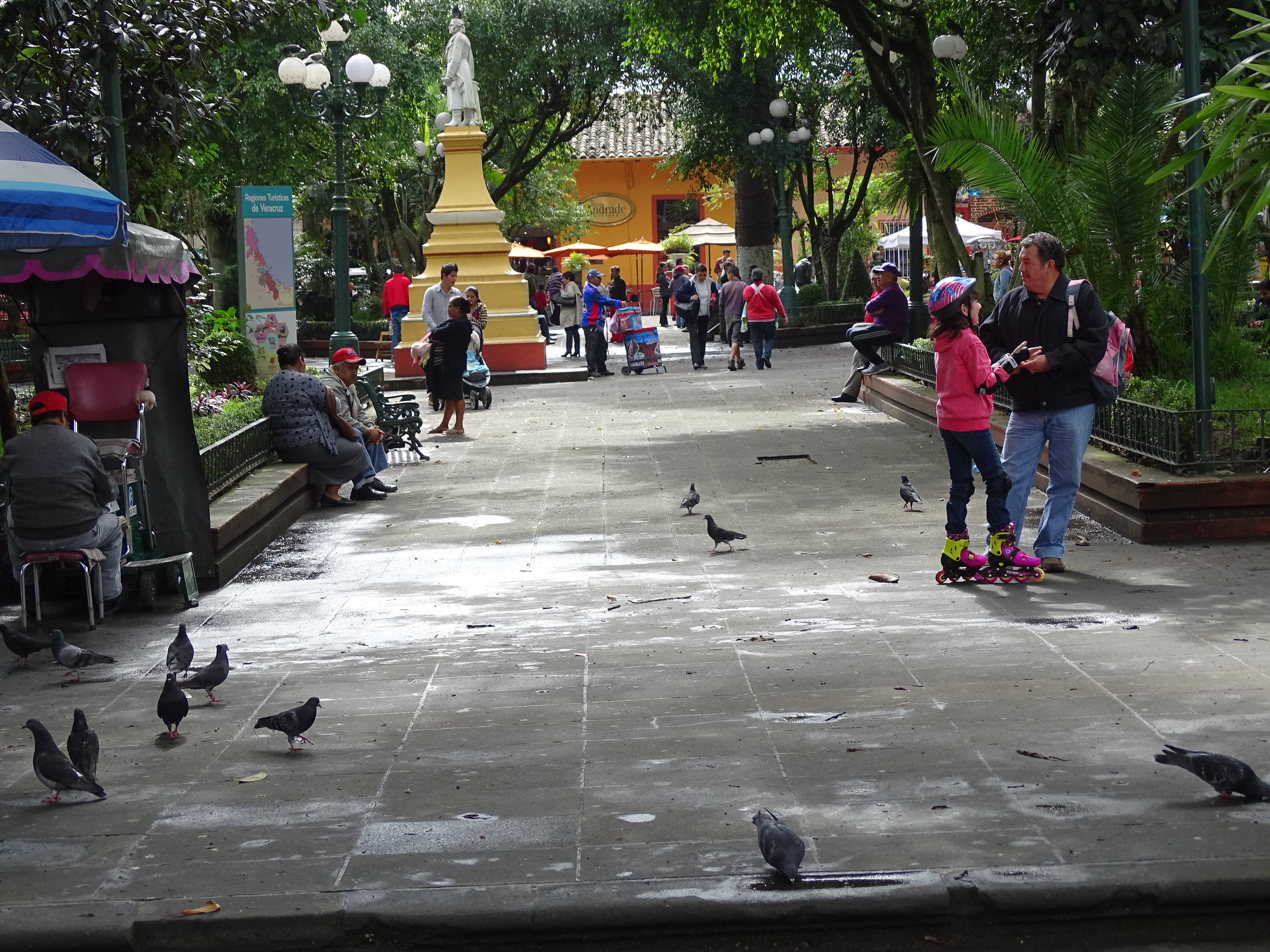
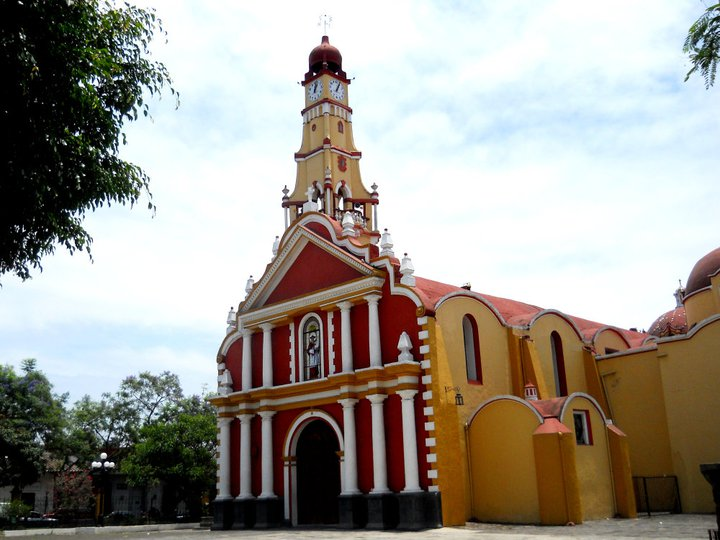
- Top: Aerial view of Coatepec Downtown; Middle: Coatepec Municipal Hall, Old houses at Coatepec downtown; Bottom: Coatepec main plaza, San Jerónimo Church

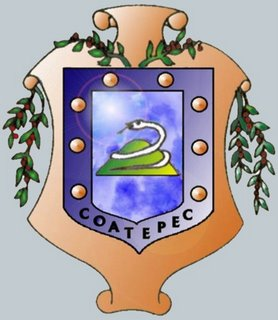
- Coat of arms

- Location in Mexico Coatepec (Mexico)
- Coordinates: 19°27′08″N 96°57′41″W
- Country: Mexico
- State: Veracruz
- Region: Capital Region
- Municipal seat and largest town: Coatepec

Government
  - Mayor: Raymundo Andrade Rivera (MORENA)

Area
  - Municipality: 202.4 km^{2} (78.1 sq mi)
- Elevation (of seat): 1,192 m (3,911 ft)

Population (2020)
  - Municipality: 93,911
  - Density: 463.9/km^{2} (1,201/sq mi)
  - Seat: 55,720
- Time zone: UTC-6 (Zona Centro)
- Postal code (of seat): 30128
- Climate: ET
- Website: (in Spanish)

Historical population
Year	Pop.	±%
1995	70,430	—
2000	73,536	+4.4%
2005	79,787	+8.5%
2010	86,696	+8.7%
2015	92,127	+6.3%
2020	93,911	+1.9%

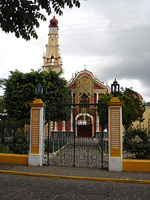
Iglesia de San Jerónimo

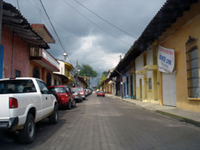
A typical street in Coatepec

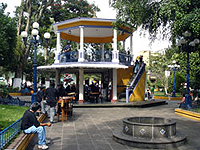
A street in Coatapec beside the City Hall

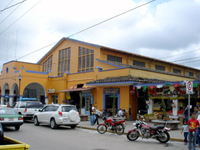
The main market of Coatepec

The municipality of Coatepec (Spanish: [koateˈpek]) is located in the central region of the Mexican state of Veracruz. Its north latitude is 19° 27′, west longitude is 96° 58′, altitude of 1,200.00 m (3,937.01 ft), and surface of 202.4 km^{2} (78.1 sq mi), which represents 0.338% of the current state. The municipal seat and largest community of the municipality is also called Coatepec. The 2020 INEGI census reported a population of 55,720 in the city, while the municipality had 93,911 inhabitants. The municipality also includes many smaller communities within its boundaries. The largest of these are Tuzamapan (population 8,300) Pacho Viejo (4,829), and Mahuixtlán (3,946).

Often called The Coffee Capital of Mexico, the name Coatepec comes from the Nahuatl coatl (serpent), and tepetl (hill), or "The Hill of the Snakes".

Coatepec was named a "Pueblo Mágico" in 2006.

== Geography ==
Coatepec borders the municipalities of Xalapa and Tlalnelhuayocan (north); Teocelo and Jalcomulco (south); Emiliano Zapata (east); and Xico and Teocelo (west).

This municipality has four small rivers: the Pixquiac, the Pintores, the Sordo and the Hueyapan; all flow into the Pescados (La Antigua) River.

=== Climate ===
Coatepec's yearly median temperature is 19.5 °C (67 °F). Seasonal variations in temperature are moderate as elsewhere in central Mexico, whilst precipitation has more pronounced changes. The warmest month is May, when temperatures top 30 °C (86 °F) on average, although at night because of the high elevation the mercury drops to 15 °C (59 °F). The coolest month is January with temperatures varying from 9 °C (48 °F) to 22 °C (72 °F). Precipitation is at its lowest during the spring months (however still some rainfall falls from late cold fronts or early thunderstorm activity). Rainfall peaks at two times during the year, in June, at the beginning of the rainy season, and in September, towards the end of it. During these months precipitation exceeds on average 300 mm (11.8 in) and have been as high as over 25 in (640.7 mm in September 1974). The city's mild to warm temperatures have their extremes in 33 °C (92 °F) in May 1984 and -1 °C (28 °F) during February, 1976. There are 161 days with rain each year, while fog is common during the winter months.

Coatepec

Climate chart (precipitation, max. and min. temperature)
J	F	M	A	M	J	J	A	S	O	N	D
60 22 9	53 23 10	54 27 12	65 28 13	112 30 15	303 28 15	276 27 14	219 28 14	318 27 15	148 26 14	89 25 12	67 23 10
- █ Average max. and min. temperatures in °C
- █ Precipitation totals in mm
- Source: Weather Underground
Imperial conversion
J	F	M	A	M	J	J	A	S	O	N	D
2.4 72 48	2.1 73 50	2.1 81 54	2.6 82 55	4.4 86 59	12 82 59	11 81 57	8.6 82 57	13 81 59	5.8 79 57	3.5 77 54	2.6 73 50
- █ Average max. and min. temperatures in °F
- █ Precipitation totals in inches

== Culture ==
Coatepec has many traditions, with the most important being The Feast of Sán Jerónimo, which the people celebrate on September 30 each year.

The foods in Coatepec that are most popular with the local population and tourists alike include tamales, chilaquiles, emmoladas, gorditas, lupitas, enfrijoladas, and others.

== Products ==
Coatepec is known for its coffee.
