= Emiliano Zapata Municipality =

There are six municipalities in Mexico named Emiliano Zapata, after the revolutionary leader of that name:

- Emiliano Zapata, Chiapas
- Emiliano Zapata, Hidalgo
- Emiliano Zapata, Morelos
- Emiliano Zapata Municipality, Tabasco
- Emiliano Zapata Municipality, Tlaxcala
- Emiliano Zapata Municipality, Veracruz
