= Emiliano Romero =

Emiliano Romero may refer to:

- Emiliano Romero (footballer, born 1985), Argentine football player for Oriente Petrolero
- Emiliano Romero (footballer, born 1992), Uruguayan football player for Juventud de Las Piedras
- Emiliano Romero (film director, born 1979), Argentinian film director
