= Emiliano Pedreira =

Argentine footballer

Personal information
- Full name: Emiliano Humberto Pedreira Salgado
- Date of birth: 5 November 1985 (age 41)
- Place of birth: Buenos Aires, Argentina
- Height: 1.91 m (6 ft 3 in)
- Position: Defender

Youth career
- 1994–1998: Escuela Marangoni
- Juventud de Saavedra (five-a-side)
- Racing de Santander

Senior career*
Years	Team	Apps	(Gls)
2005–2006	Rayo Cantabria	–	(–)
2006–2009	Los Barrios		
2009–2010	Almería B		
2010–2015	Acassuso	156	(2)
2016–2018	Ñublense	33	(2)
2019	Independiente Cauquenes	22	(2)
- * Club domestic league appearances and goals

Emiliano Humberto Pedreira Salgado (born 5 November 1985) is a former Argentine footballer who played as a defender.

== Career ==
As a youth player, Pedreira was with Escuela de Fútbol (Football Academy) Marangoni and Juventud de Saavedra (five-a-side football) in his homeland. A defender from Racing de Santander, Pedreira played for Rayo Cantabria, UD Los Barrios and Almería B in Spain.

Back in Argentina, he played for Acassuso.

In 2016, Pedreira moved to Chile and played for both Ñublense and Independiente de Cauquenes.
