= Emiliano Strappini =

Argentine footballer

Personal information
- Full name: Emiliano Strappini Allen
- Date of birth: 4 September 1986 (age 40)
- Place of birth: Armstrong, Argentina
- Position: Forward

Youth career
- 2000–2006: Chacarita Juniors
- 2006: Atlético Madrid B

Senior career*
Years	Team	Apps	(Gls)
2006	Chacarita Juniors	9	(0)
2007	Lota Schwager	35	(4)
2008–2009	Chacarita Juniors	2	(0)
2010–2012	Guaraní Antonio Franco	14	(1)
2012	GC Biaschesi	–	(–)
2013	Defensores de Armstrong	–	(–)
- * Club domestic league appearances and goals

Emiliano Strappini Allen (born 4 September 1986) is an Argentinian former footballer who played as a forward.

== Career ==
Born and raised in Armstrong, Santa Fe Province, Strappini started his career at Chacarita Juniors' youth set-up aged 14. In 2006, he went on trial to Atlético Madrid reserve side, but he failed to join Spanish team after didn't reaching an agreement with the club.

In January 2007, Strappini joined to Chilean club Lota Schwager, freshly promoted to the top division. He debuted with Ñublense and his first goal came on May 15 in a 2–1 loss with powerhouse Universidad de Chile, scoring the game's first goal. Then, on May 27, he scored his side's two goals in a 2–2 draw with Deportes La Serena. He left Lota after the team's relegation and ended the entire season with 5 goals in 34 appearances.

In January 2008, Strappini returned to Chacarita after being heavy linked with a move to Ecuadorian powerhouse Emelec.

In 2010, Strappini joined Guaraní Antonio Franco.

In 2012, Strappini moved to Switzerland and joined GC Biaschesi in the 1. Liga.

Back in Argentina, Strappini joined Defensores de Armstrong in February 2013.

== Honours ==
Chacarita Juniors

- Primera B Nacional: 2008–09
