= Emiliano Mundrucu =

Brazilian soldier and civil rights activist (1791–1863)

Emiliano Felipe Benício Mundrucu (1791–1863) was a Brazilian soldier, abolitionist, and civil rights activist. He is thought to have been the first plaintiff in a lawsuit in the United States against racial discrimination and segregation although the cause of action was breach of contract.

== Early life ==
Mundrucu was born in Recife, Brazil in 1791. He initially distinguished himself in the Colonial Brazilian military, rising to the rank of captain in a pardo battalion.

Mundrucu was part of two popular rebellions in Pernambuco, a northeast state of Brazil. In 1817 and 1824, he fought for the independence of the Pernambuco State from the Portuguese Kingdom alongside Joaquim da Natividade Saldanha and Manuel de Carvalho Pais de Andrade. Ultimately, his association with firebrand Brazilian republicanism put him at odds with the Portuguese monarchy, forcing him to flee Brazil when the Confederation of the Equator failed.

He briefly spent time in two young South American and Caribbean republics between 1824 and 1826, enlisting in the Venezuelan army and travelling to Haiti. Thereafter, Mundrucu settled in Boston, although he did travel back to Brazil on several occasions.

== Lawsuit ==
In 1833, Mundrucu, his wife Harriet (born in Boston), and his one-year-old daughter, Emiliana, boarded the Telegraph, a steamboat heading from New Bedford to Nantucket, Massachusetts. Mundrucu's wife and daughter were impeded from entering the ladies-only cabin that he had paid for because of their skin colour.

Mundrucu sued Edward Barker, the steamboat captain from Massachusetts, for breach of contract, for refusing to allow his family into the ladies cabins (which were kept for whites only) despite having paid the highest price of ticket. In the Boston Court of Common Pleas, the plaintiff's lawyers (noted abolitionist David Lee Child and Massachusetts Senator Daniel Webster) appealed to the jury to consider Captain Edward Barker's actions a 'violation of humanity.' The case garnered local and national attention as a pivotal moment in early campaigns against racial discrimination and segregation. The jury found Barker guilty of breach of contract and awarded Mundrucu $125 in damages in October 1833, but the captain managed to overturn the decision in January 1834 in the Massachusetts Supreme Judicial Court, which found there was no evidence that Barker had explicitly agreed that the family would travel in the best cabins.

American historian Caitlin Fitz believes the Mundrucus' actions may have been part of a premeditated plan to challenge segregation rather than a spontaneous decision.

== Later life ==
Mundrucu received a pardon from the Brazilian government and briefly resumed his military career there in the mid-1830s, before returning to Boston in 1841

Mundrucu's contribution to the U.S. civil rights and abolitionist movement continued over subsequent decades. He became a prominent activist against segregation in schools, transport and public spaces, while also advocating for full citizenship rights for African Americans. In January 1863, he celebrated the Emancipation Proclamation shoulder-to-shoulder with Frederick Douglass and other prominent African American abolitionists at a meeting of the Union Progressive Association, of which he was a vice-president.

He died in Boston, United States in 1863.

== Legacy ==
Historians Belton Lloyd and Hebe Mattos raise the possibility that Mundrucu’s attempt of getting inside the "whites-only" cabin as an intentional act of resistance. Historian Lloyd Belton notes that the action "directly inspired other black activists. There was another very famous African-American activist, David Ruggles, who did the exact same thing as Mundrucu on the same boat a few years later, in 1841."

== Personal life ==
His first wife was named Ann. His second wife was named Harriet.
