= Emiliano Giron =

Dominican baseball player (1972-)

- Pitcher
- Born: January 5, 1972 (age 54); Villa Mella, Dominican Republic
- Batted: Right Threw: Right

KBO debut
- 1999, for the Lotte Giants

Last appearance
- 2003, for the Hanwha Eagles

Career statistics
- Win–loss record: 22–14
- Earned run average: 4.64
- Strikeouts: 282
- Stats at Baseball Reference

Teams
- Lotte Giants (1999–2001); Hanwha Eagles (2003)

Emiliano Giron (born January 5, 1972) is a Dominican former professional baseball pitcher. After playing in the minor league system of the Cincinnati Reds from 1994 to 1996, he played with the Duluth–Superior Dukes of the Northern League in 1997 and 1998. For the next three seasons, he played for the Lotte Giants of the Korea Baseball Organization (KBO). Following a stint with the St. Paul Saints, he returned to the KBO, playing for the Hanwha Eagles in 2003.

== Career ==
Since 2004 Giron played with the team Chinatrust Whales from the Chinese Professional Baseball League, debuting with a six innings start win.

He returned to Taiwan for the 2005 season with the same team, winning the game were his team achieved their 400th league win.

He ended the season with a 9–4 record and a league second 1.83 ERA.

In 2006, he pitched in the Mexican League with Acereros de Monclova.
