= Emiliana =

Emiliana is a feminine name of Italian origin. It can refer to:

== As a given name ==
- Emiliana Arango (born 2000), Colombian tennis player
- Emiliana of Trasilla and Emiliana, Catholic saints
- Emilíana Torrini (born 1977), Icelandic singer
- Emiliana Vargas (born 2009), Colombian rhythmic gymnast

== As a surname ==
- Cesare Emiliani (1922–1995), Italian-American geologist and paleontologist

== Biology ==
- Emiliania (coccolithophore), a genus of phytoplankton
- Emiliania, former name of a genus of bivalves now called Emiliodonta
- Emiliana (planthopper), a genus of insects in subfamily Tropiduchinae

== See also ==
- Emilian (disambiguation)
- Emily (disambiguation)
