= Emily (2017 film) =

- Directed by: Ryan Graves
- Written by: Ryan Graves
- Produced by: Kelly Song
- Starring: Rachael Perrell Fosket; Michael Draper
- Cinematography: Kevin Forrest
- Edited by: Evan Gandy
- Music by: Michael Charles Smith
- Production companies: Stately and Spry Pictures
- Distributed by: Hibernation Films
- Release date: 27 January 2017
- Running time: 83 minutes
- Country: United States
- Language: English

Emily is a 2017 American drama film directed by Ryan Graves, starring Rachael Perrell Fosket and Michael Draper.

== Cast ==
- Rachael Perrell Fosket as Emily
- Michael Draper as Nathan
- Sonya Davis as Julia
- Brian Sutherland as Steve
- David Withers as Frank

== Reception ==
Tom Keogh of The Seattle Times rated the film 3 stars out of 4 and called it "insightful and quietly unnerving".

Andrew Wright of The Stranger wrote, "Throughout, Emily proves to be a movie with an impressive understanding and respect for the uncertainty principle of coexistence."

Dan Webster of The Spokesman-Review wrote that the film "neither resorts to cliché nor wallows in self-involvement", and that the "strength of what Graves does involves not just the quality of his film’s production but how he works out the thematic issues he raises."

Walker MacMurdo of Willamette Week gave the film a "B" and wrote, "Despite the budgetary restrictions found in any independent feature, Emily is a compelling film."
