= Emiliano Dei =

Italian footballer (born 1971)

Personal information
- Date of birth: 13 January 1971 (age 55)
- Place of birth: Rome, Italy
- Height: 1.85 m (6 ft 1 in)
- Position: Goalkeeper

Senior career*
Years	Team	Apps	(Gls)
1990–1992	Ternana Calcio	0	(0)
1992–1995	Trani	55	(0)
1995–1997	Castrovillari	67	(0)
1997–1998	Trapani	34	(0)
1998–2002	Benevento	106	(0)
2002–2004	Varese	66	(0)
2004–2006	Rimini	63	(0)
2006–2008	San Marino	65	(0)
2008–2009	Sangiovannese	50	(0)
2010	Carrarese	14	(0)
2010–2011	Rimini		
- * Club domestic league appearances and goals

Emiliano Dei (born 13 January 1971) is an Italian former footballer who played as a goalkeeper.
