= Emilian =

Emilian may refer to:

- Emilia (region), a region of northern Italy
- Emilian of Cogolla, a Visigothic saint
- Emilian dialects, spoken in Emilia, northern Italy
- A Romanian male given name:
  - Emilian Bratu (1904–1991), chemical engineer
  - Emilian Dobrescu (born 1933), economist
  - Emilian Dolha (born 1979), footballer
  - Emilian Galaicu-Păun (born 1964), author and editor
  - Emilian Voiutschi (1850–1920), theologian and cleric
  - Emilian Zabara, sprint canoeist
- A Romanian surname:
  - Céline Emilian (1898–1983), sculptor
  - Cornelia Emilian (1840–1910), journalist and women's rights activist
  - Ștefan Emilian (1819–1899), mathematician and architect

== See also ==
- Emiliana (disambiguation)
- Emiliano, a given name
- Emilia (disambiguation)
