= Emiliano Melis =

Italian footballer (born 1979)

Personal information
- Date of birth: 3 March 1979 (age 47)
- Place of birth: Selargius, Italy
- Height: 1.73 m (5 ft 8 in)
- Position: Forward

Senior career*
Years	Team	Apps	(Gls)
1998–2003	Cagliari		
2002	→ Alessandria (loan)		
2003	Torres		
2004–2005	Pistoiese		
2006–2007	Grosseto		
2007–2008	Benevento		
2008–2009	Vibonese		
2009–2011	Selargius		
2011	Arzachena		
2011–2012	Muravera		
2012–2014	Selargius		
- * Club domestic league appearances and goals

Emiliano Melis (born 3 March 1979) is a retired Italian football striker.
