= Emiliano González =

Emiliano González is the name of:

- Emiliano González Arqués (born 1969), Andorran footballer
- Emiliano González Navero (1861–1934), Paraguayan politician
