= Emiliano Massimo =

Italian footballer (born 1989)

Personal information
- Date of birth: 11 October 1989 (age 37)
- Place of birth: Rome, Italy
- Height: 1.74 m (5 ft 9 in)
- Position: Defensive midfielder

Team information
- Current team: Trastevere

Youth career
- Nuova Tor Tre Teste
- 2005–2009: Roma

Senior career*
Years	Team	Apps	(Gls)
2009–2011	Aversa Normanna	53	(0)
2011–2012	Roma	0	(0)
2012–2014	Avellino	41	(1)
2014–2015	Grosseto	4	(0)
2015	Ischia	13	(0)
2015–2016	Chieti	25	(6)
2016–2017	Racing Roma	25	(2)
2017–2018	Cavese	33	(7)
2018–2019	Taranto	29	(2)
2019–2020	Monterosi	11	(1)
2020–	Trastevere	135	(9)
- * Club domestic league appearances and goals as of 22 Juny 2026

Emiliano Massimo (born 11 October 1989) is an Italian footballer who plays as a defensive midfielder for Serie D club Trastevere.

== Club career ==
Born in Rome, Massimo finished his youth career with Roma's youth setup, but left for Aversa Normanna in July 2009 in a co-ownership deal. In June 2011 he returned to Roma.

On 24 June 2012 Massimo joined Avellino, again in a co-ownership; he also took part of the squad who won the 2012–13 Lega Pro Prima Divisione. On 26 June 2013, he renewed his link with the Biancoverdi, running until 2016.

On 14 September Massimo made his Serie B debut, coming on as a second-half substitute in a 0–1 loss at Virtus Lanciano; he scored his first goal ten days later, netting his side's only in a draw at Pescara.

On 10 July 2018, he joined Taranto in the Serie D on a one-year contract. In June 2019, play in the Serie D for Monterosi FC.
