= Emiliano Zapata Municipality, Veracruz =

Emiliano Zapata, Veracruz
- Municipality
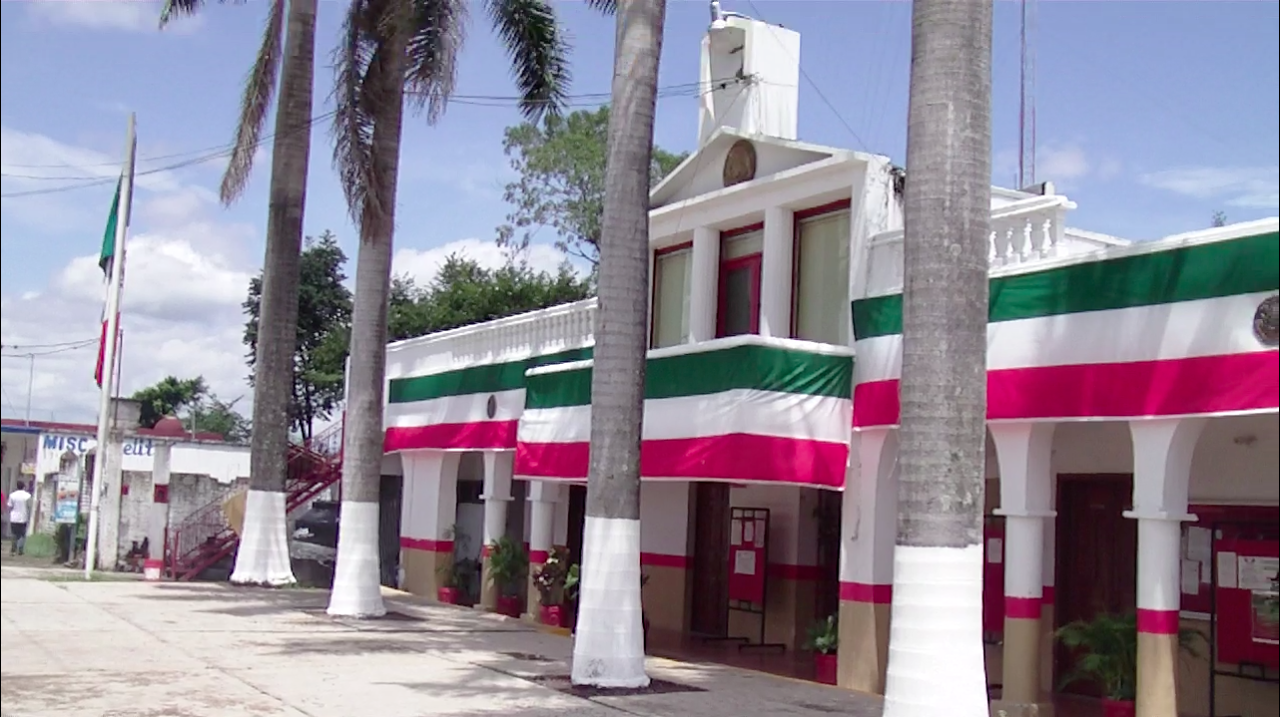
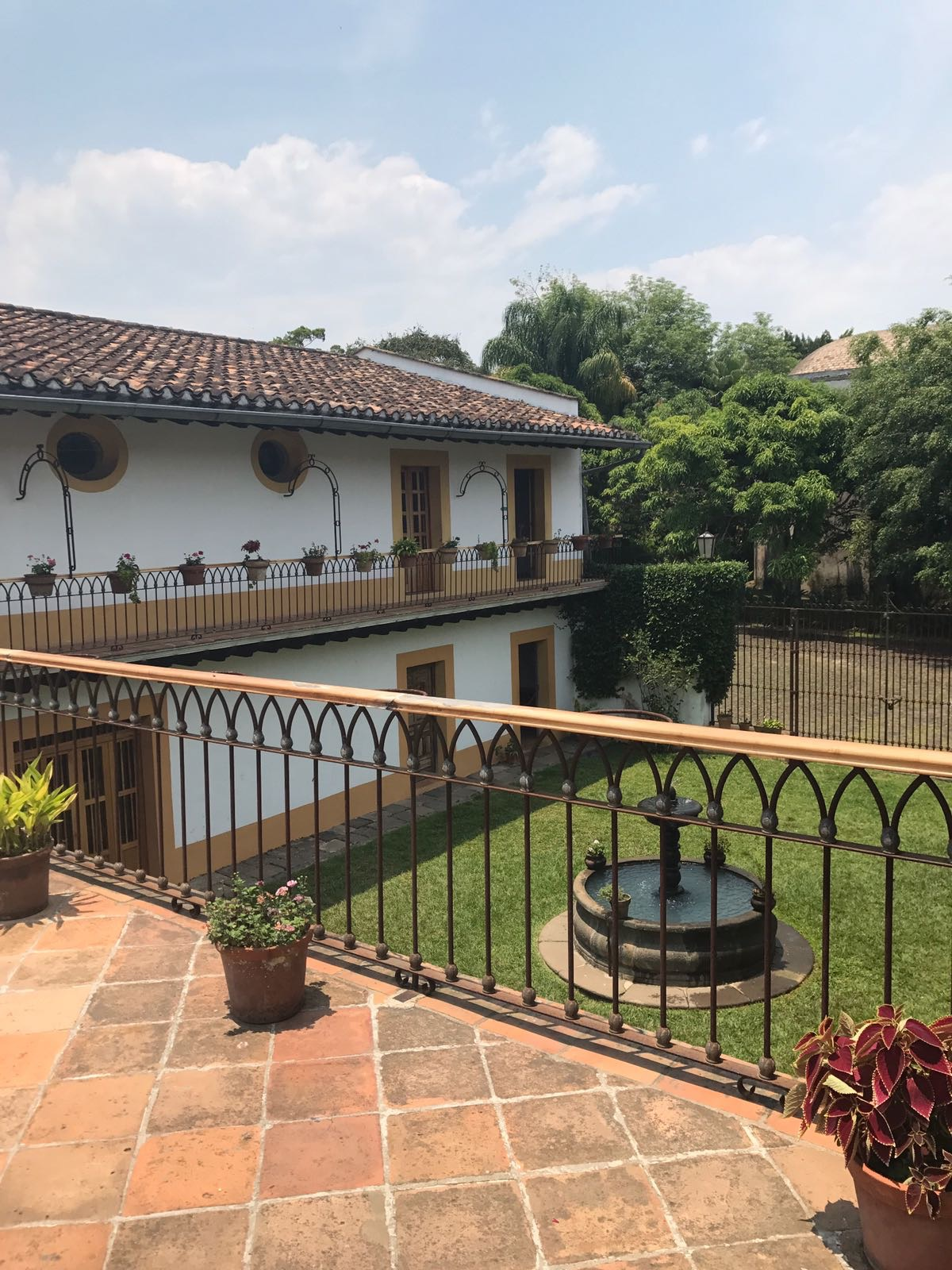
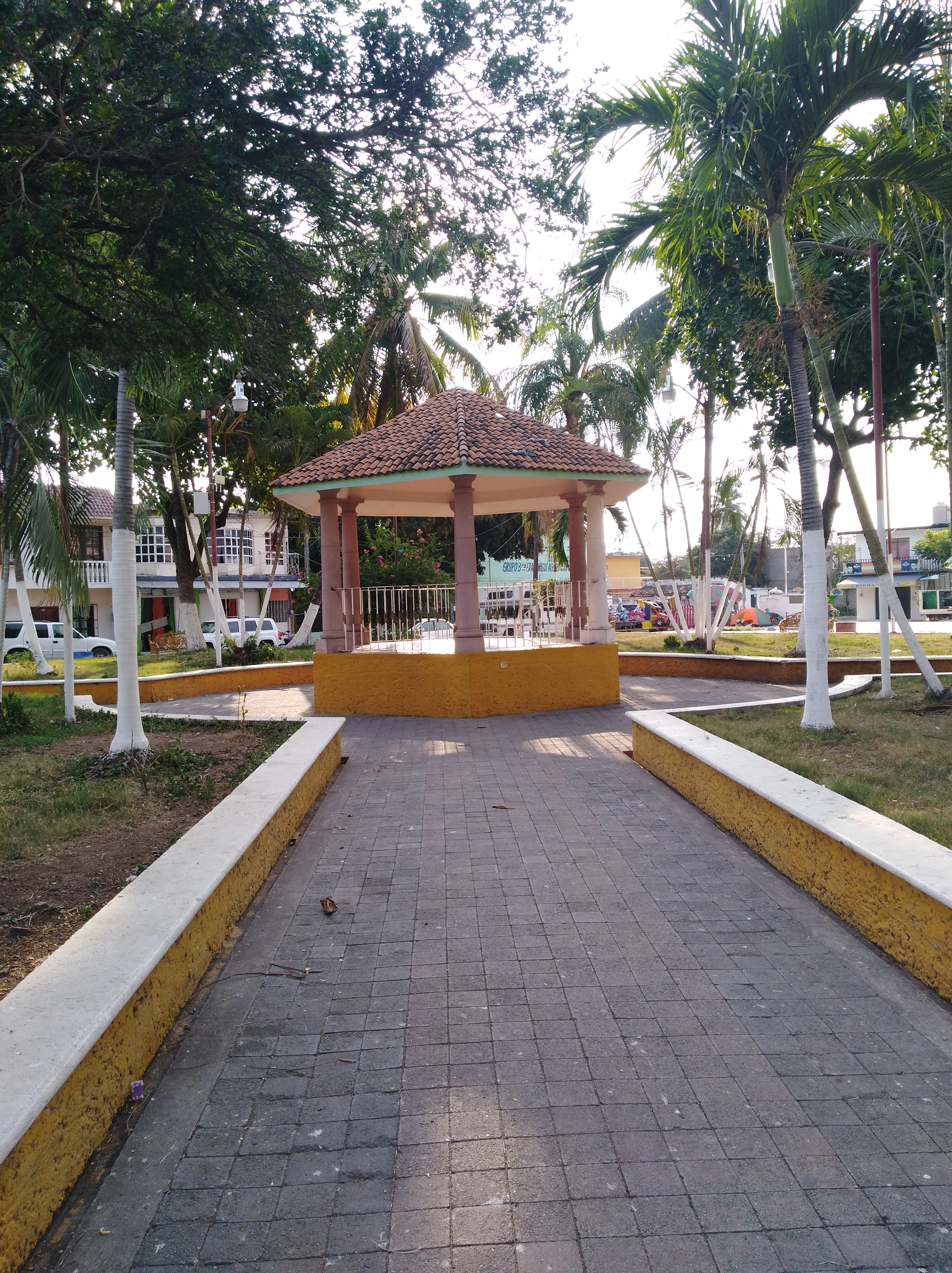
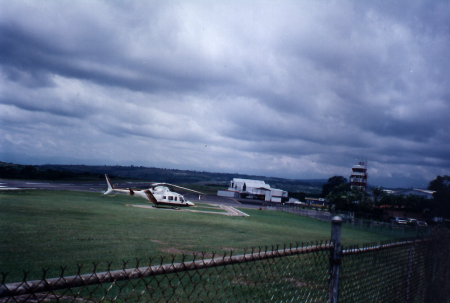
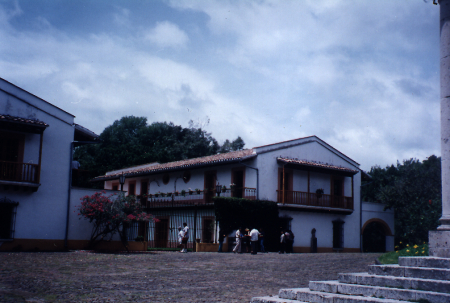
- Top: Emiliano Zapata Municipal Palace; Middle: El Lencero gardens, Rinconada main plaza; Bottom: El Lencero Airport, El Lencero old buildings

- Coat of arms

- Location within Veracruz Location within Mexico
- Coordinates: 19°27′28″N 96°45′57″W
- Country: Mexico
- State: Veracruz
- Region: Capital Region
- Municipal seat: Dos Ríos, Veracruz
- Largest town: Jacarandas

Government
  - Municipal President: Daniel Antonio Baizabal González (MORENA)

Area
  - Total: 415.7 km^{2} (160.5 sq mi)
- Elevation (of seat): 827 m (2,713 ft)

Population (2020)
  - Total: 85,489
  - Density: 415.7/km^{2} (1,077/sq mi)
  - Seat: 1,698
- Time zone: UTC-6 (Central (US Central))
- Postal code (of seat): 55697
- Website: https://www.emilianozapata.gob.mx/

Historical population
Year	Pop.	±%
1995	40,411	—
2000	44,580	+10.3%
2005	49,476	+11.0%
2010	61,718	+24.7%
2015	78,336	+26.9%
2020	85,489	+9.1%

Emiliano Zapata is a municipality in the Mexican state of Veracruz. It is located 2 km from Jalapa-Enríquez on Federal Highways 180 and 190. The municipality is named for the hero of the Mexican Revolution, Emiliano Zapata. The municipal seat is at Dos Ríos.

== Geography ==
=== Adjacent municipalities ===
- Xalapa (northwest)
- Actopan (northeast)
- Puente Nacional (south)
- Apazapan (south)
- Jalcomulco (south)
- Coatepec (west)

== Demographics ==
As of 2020, the municipality had a population of 85,489 inhabitants in 141 localities. Just a fraction (1,698 hab.) resides in the municipal seat, Dos Ríos. The biggest localities are Jacarandas (11,864 hab.), Rinconada (8,005 hab.), La Pradera (7,500 hab.), La Estanzuela (4,951 hab.) and El Carrizal (4,714 hab.).

=== Major highways ===
- Mexican Federal Highway 140
- Mexican Federal Highway 140D
