= Emiliano Tortolano =

Italian footballer (born 1990)

Personal information
- Date of birth: 22 May 1990 (age 36)
- Place of birth: Rome, Italy
- Height: 1.70 m (5 ft 7 in)
- Position: Winger

Team information
- Current team: Trastevere

Youth career
- Roma

Senior career*
Years	Team	Apps	(Gls)
2009–2010	→ Colligiana (loan)	25	(3)
2010–2012	Latina	51	(16)
2012	→ Pergocrema (loan)	13	(2)
2013–2016	Catania	0	(0)
2013	→ Sorrento (loan)	12	(2)
2013–2014	→ Catanzaro (loan)	13	(1)
2014	→ Aprilia (loan)	13	(1)
2014–2015	→ Cosenza (loan)	25	(4)
2015–2016	→ Melfi (loan)	24	(0)
2016–2017	Sambenedettese	21	(2)
2017	→ Viterbese (loan)	4	(0)
2017–2019	SFF Atletico	67	(22)
2019–2020	Ostia Mare	23	(3)
2020–2021	Latina	9	(5)
2021	Cynthialbalonga	3	(0)
2021	Pomezia		
2022	SSA Rieti	13	(5)
2022–2023	Trastevere	31	(8)
2023	Cassino	11	(0)
2023–	Trastevere	4	(0)
- * Club domestic league appearances and goals as of 20 December 2023

Emiliano Tortolano (born 22 May 1990) is an Italian professional football player who plays for Serie D club Trastevere.

== Career ==
Ahead of the 2019–20 season, Tortolano joined Ostia Mare.
