= Emiliano Zapata (footballer) =

Argentine footballer

Personal information
- Full name: Emiliano Elias Zapata
- Date of birth: December 18, 1987 (age 38)
- Place of birth: Villaguay, Entre Ríos, Argentina
- Height: 1.80 m (5 ft 11 in)
- Position: Midfielder

Senior career*
Years	Team	Apps	(Gls)
2006	Club Atletico Estudiantes Universitarios	12	(8)
2006–2008	Sportivo Belgrano	20	(13)
2009–2010	San Telmo	24	(17)
- * Club domestic league appearances and goals

Emiliano Elias Zapata (born August 12, 1986) is an Argentine football offensive midfielder.

== Career ==
He has previously played in Argentine Torneo Argentino B, and in Primera B Metropolitana.
He started playing for the National Technological University Team in 2006.
The same year he started training for Sportivo Belgrano, but his first official game was in April 2007 when he played a few minutes entering from the bench. During 2007–2008 he played 20 official matches scoring 13 goals.
In 2009, he moved to Buenos Aires and started playing for San Telmo where he played 24 official matches scoring 17 goals. And more than 30 non-official matches.
