= Emiliano Ramos (politician) =

Mexican politician

Emiliano Vladimir Ramos Hernández (born March 28, 1979, in Cancún, Quintana Roo) is a Mexican left-wing politician affiliated with the Party of the Democratic Revolution (PRD) who served in the Chamber of Deputies of Mexico during the LIX Legislature.

== Political career ==
In the late 1990s Ramos Hernández joined the Party of the Democratic Revolution (PRD) in his native Quintana Roo. He has served as under-secretary of youth of the PRD among other positions inside his party. He occupied a seat in the lower house of the Mexican Congress during the LIX legislature.

He is currently studying law at the National Autonomous University of Mexico (UNAM).

=== Anti-globalization ===
He has been an active protester against globalization since 2001 and a notable activist against the FTAA. Ramos Hernández attended the 2001 and 2003 protests against the World Economic Forum held in Cancún, he also attended the anti-FTAA summit held in Cuba in December 2002.

In 2005 he gained notoriety supporting President Hugo Chávez during an event held in Caracas few days after the 2005 diplomatic crisis between Mexico and Venezuela had begun.
