= Emiliano Reali =

Italian writer (born 1976)

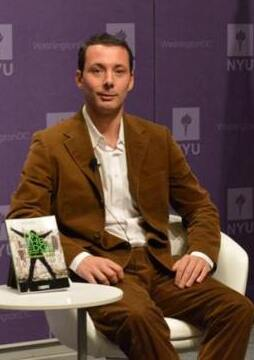
- Emiliano Reali at New York University in 2014
- Born: November 3, 1976 (age 49); Roma, Italy
- Occupation: Novelist
- Writing career
- Language: Italian
- Period: 2001–present
- Genres: Fantasy, novels, short stories
- Website: emilianoreali.com

Emiliano Reali (Italian pronunciation: [emiˈljaːno reˈaːli]); born November 3, 1976, in Rome, is an Italian writer and blogger. Some of his books have been translated into English and Spanish. He currently lives in Rome.

== Life and works ==
Reali was born in Rome on November 3, 1976, and his career began in 2001 when he won a literary prize from the Scuola Holden of Turin with La corda d'argento (The silver cord), after inserted into the collection Sul ciglio del dirupo. His books deal with personal and social issues: from fairy tales for children and fantasy novels, to hardness and violence in novels and short stories.

Ordinary, his first novel, was published in 2004, denouncing homophobia and telling the difficulties of a young gay man, and was turned into a play for The Special Project Theatre 2007/2008, sponsored by the City of Rome and the Italian Society of Authors and Publishers. In 2008 he published the illustrated fairy tale for children Il cristallo del cuore (The crystal of heart); together with La reggia di luce (The palace of light) written in 2009, they have become a textbook for elementary schools. 2009 also saw the publishing of his second novel Se Bambi fosse trans? (What if Bambi were a trans?), dealing with gender identity and sexual orientation issues, which received critical interest.

In 2010 two stories were published in two anthologies: Dannato (Damned), in Controcuore and Laura Pausini, in Diva Mon Amour, part of the proceeds being donated to the fight against AIDS. In 2011 his fantasy novel Il seme della speranza (The Seed of Hope) was published, a story about today's society, which focused on the effects of greed for power and money in today's society. That same year he wrote the story and screenplay for the short film Santallegria, on the subject of transsexuality. In 2012 he published a collection of short stories Sul ciglio del dirupo (On the edge), with a preface by the prince Jonathan Doria Pamphilj, sponsored by the city of Rome for its social value. For his anti-discrimination efforts, in 2012 he was selected to be part of the honorary committee of the association Equality Italia, founded by Aurelio Mancuso, which aims to become "the first Italian lobby on civil rights".

In May 2013 a totally rewritten version of Ordinary was published, and it was the first ARBook in Italy to use augmented reality. This was followed, at the end of the year, by a comic version of the novel. In December 2014 a bilingual version, Italian and English, of Sul ciglio del dirupo was published for the American market, along with On the Edge. Reali presented the book at New York University and the Italian Cultural Institute at the Italian Embassy in Washington.

In November 2015 a new publisher – Meridiano Zero of the Odoya Group- republished Se Bambi fosse trans? in a new edition and also published simultaneously its sequel Maschio o femmina? (Male or female?), and in 2017 published the third book closing the Bambi trilogy Ad ogni costo (At any cost). He keeps the column Nel giardino delle parole (in the garden of words) on the Huffington Post (Italian edition), where he recounted books and he collaborates with the Italian daily newspapers Il Mattino and Il Riformista.

In 2020 and 2021 were published two new editions of Il seme della speranza (The Seed of Hope) and the novel was used in several schools like reading text and "Se Bambi fosse trans?" was published in Spanish in Mexico, Argentina and Spain. In 2022 Reali published Bambi. Storia di una metamorfosi (Bambi. Story of a metamorphosis), novel well received from the press and the readers and recently collaborated to the realization of the serie Refuge produced by Lucky Red.

In 2024, he collaborated on the university volume "Manual of LGBTQIA+ Studies" (Utet), contributing two modules: one on LGBTQIA+ narrative and one on LGBTQIA+ journalism. He then published a short story in the photographic volume "Pride" (Scripta Maneant).

The film adaptation rights of "Bambi. Story of a Metamorphosis" have been sold, a financial contribution has been obtained from the Ministry of Culture, and a film based on the first chapter of the trilogy is in progress.

== Bibliography ==
=== Novels ===
- Ordinary (Serarcangeli Editore, 2004) ISBN 88-7408-047-6
- Se Bambi fosse trans? (Edizioni Azimut, 2009) ISBN 978-88-6003-098-6
- Ordinary ARBook (Edizioni DEd'A, 2013) ISBN 978-88-96121-83-2
- Se Bambi fosse trans? (Edizioni Meridiano Zero, 2015) ISBN 978-88-8237-345-0
- Maschio o femmina? (Edizioni Meridiano Zero, 2015) ISBN 978-88-8237-346-7
- Ad ogni costo (Edizioni Meridiano Zero, 2017) ISBN 978-88-8237-464-8
- Bambi. Storia di una metamorfosi (Avagliano, 2022) ISBN 978-88-8309-432-3

=== Anthologies ===
- Dannato, in Controcuore (Edizioni Azimut, 2010) ISBN 978-88-6003-113-6
- Laura Pausini, in Diva Mon Amour (Edizioni Azimut, 2010) ISBN 978-88-6003-123-5

=== Short stories ===
- Sul ciglio del dirupo (Edizioni DEd'A, 2012) ISBN 978-88-96121-79-5
- Pride (Scripta Maneant, 2024) ISBN 979-12-80717-64-1

=== Children books ===
- Il cristallo del cuore (Edizioni EdiGiò, 2008) ISBN 978-88-6205-133-0
- La reggia di luce (Edizioni EdiGiò, 2009) ISBN 978-88-6205-030-2
- Il seme della speranza (Diamond Editore, 2011) ISBN 978-88-96650-00-4
- Il seme della speranza (Watson, 2020) ISBN 978-88-87224-73-3
- Il seme della speranza (Scatole Parlanti, 2021) ISBN 978-88-3281-358-6

=== Graphic novels ===
- Ordinary (Edizioni DEd'A, 2013) ISBN 978-88-96121-90-0

=== Bilingual books ===
- On the edge (DeBooks, 2014) ISBN 978-0-9907874-1-9

=== Short films ===
- Santallegria, directed by Maurizio Rigatti (2011)

=== Essays ===
- Manuale di studi LGBTQIA + (Utet, 2024) ISBN 978-88-6008-954-0
