= Contat =

Contat (English: /kɒ̃ˈtɑː/, French: [kɔ̃ta]) is a French surname. Notable people with the surname include:

- Émilie Contat (1770–1846), French actress
- Florence Blatrix-Contat (born 1966), French politician
- Louise Contat (1760–1813), French actress
