= Émilie Contat =

French stage actress

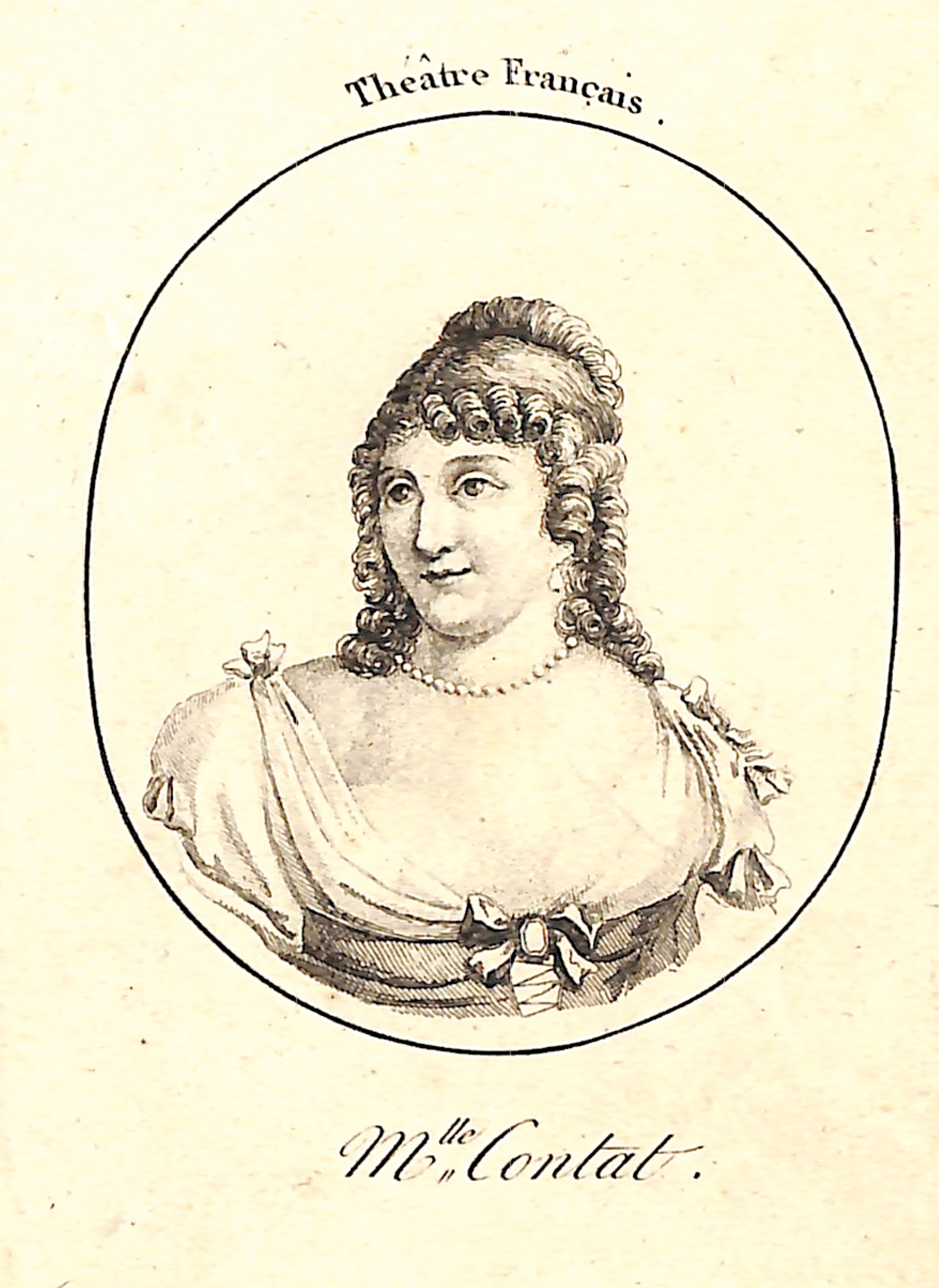
Portrait of Émilie Contat

Émilie Contat (English: /kɒ̃ˈtɑː/ kon-TAH, French: [emili kɔ̃ta]; 1770–1846), was a French stage actress. She was engaged at the Comédie-Française in 1784 and became a sociétaire in 1784. She retired in 1815.

Her sister Louise Contat was also an actress.
