= Marie Nicolas =

French painter

Marie Joséphine Nicolas
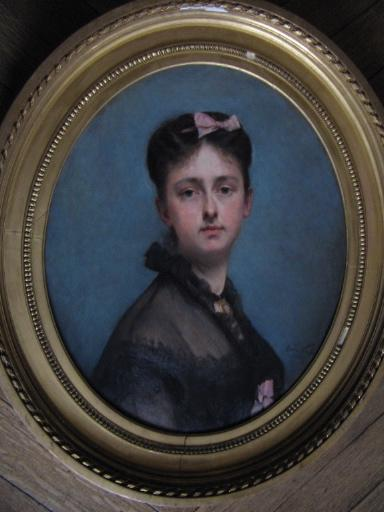
- Self-portrait (1871)
- Born: 25 July 1845; Villers-Cotterêts, Aisne, France
- Died: 1903 (aged 57–58)

Marie Joséphine Nicolas (25 July 1845 – 1903) was a French painter.

Nicolas was born in Villers-Cotterêts, Aisne and was also known as Marie Nicholas or Marie Joséphine Drapier. She was a pupil of Levasseur and Charles Joshua Chaplin and is known for portraits and genre works. She first showed work at the Paris Salon of 1867 and her 1882 work Father Ricard was included in the book Women Painters of the World. Her self-portrait is preserved in the local museum of her hometown.

== Selected works ==
Self Portrait (1871)

Father Ricard (1882)

Fillette en prière

Jeune Bretonne et sa poupée (1889)
