= Charles Joshua Chaplin =

French painter

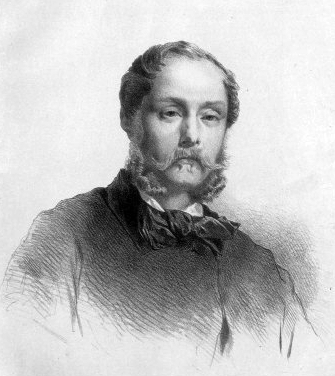
- Portrait of Charles Joshua Chaplin by Célestin Nanteuil
- Born: 8 June 1825; Les Andelys, Eure, France
- Died: 30 January 1891 (aged 65); Paris, France
- Resting place: Père Lachaise Cemetery
- Education: École des Beaux-Arts, Paris
- Known for: Painting, decorative painting (Tuileries Palace, Palais de l’Elysée).
- Style: Neo-Rococo, realism (early work)
- Movement: Academic art

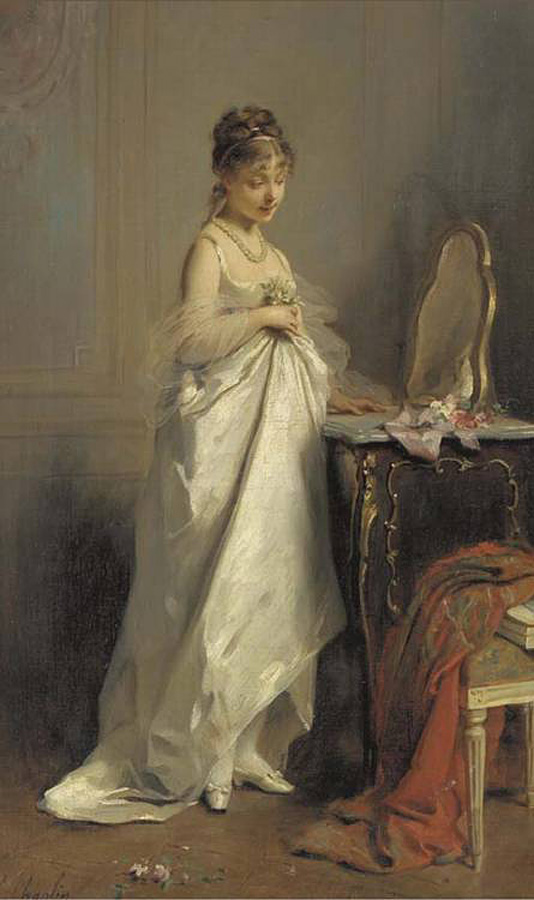
Reflection

Charles Joshua Chaplin (8 June 1825 – 30 January 1891) was a French painter and printmaker who painted both landscapes and portraits. He worked in techniques such as pastels, lithography, watercolor, chalk, oil painting and etching. He was best known for his elegant portraits of young women.

== Biography ==
Charles Joshua Chaplin was born on 8 June 1825 in Les Andelys, Eure, France. His mother, Olympia Adelle Moisy, was French, whereas his father, John Chaplin, was an art broker from England. Charles Chaplin spent his whole life in France, becoming a naturalized citizen in 1886. He studied at the École des Beaux-Arts in Paris from 1840, and he took private lessons in the studio of Michel Martin Drolling, whose apprentices included Paul Baudry, Jules Breton and Jean-Jacques Henner. Later he also taught at the École des Beaux-Arts.

In 1845, he entered the Paris Salon, the official art exhibition of the Académie des Beaux-Arts, as a portrait and landscape painter with the painting Portrait of the Artist's Mother. Chaplin conducted art classes specifically for women at his studio, including Marie Joséphine Nicolas. The American artist Mary Cassatt, the French artist Louise Abbéma and the English artist Louise Jopling were among Chaplin's students. His son Arthur Chaplin (1869-1935) was also a painter. Chaplin died on 30 January 1891, aged 65, in Paris as a wealthy man and is buried in the Père Lachaise Cemetery.

== Career ==
=== Early work ===
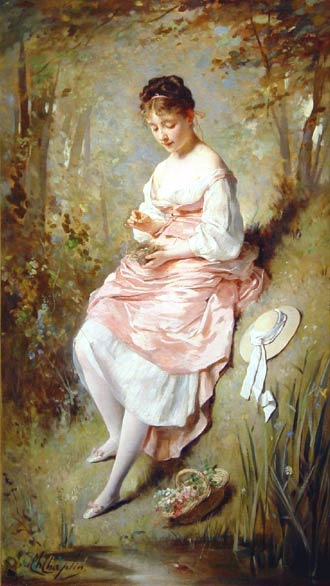
The Bird's Nest, private collection, 1860

Chaplin made his debut at the Salon with portraits, but he also painted landscapes, particularly the countryside of Auvergne. His early works, from 1848 to 1851, were painted in a manner characterized by an interest in realism, a style established in the French Second Republic, that had the motto Liberté, égalité, fraternité, and was ruled for three years by the republican government of France from the 1848 Revolution until the 1851 coup by Louis-Napoléon Bonaparte. Realism was an artistic movement that began in France in the 1850s, after the 1848 Revolution. From the late 18th century Romanticism dominated French art and literature but was spurned by Realists, who revolted against the display of the emotions of the Romantic movement, seeking to depict real and characteristic contemporary individuals and situations with truth and accuracy.

Chaplin painted many works in his early days, including floral studies that were displayed at the Salon de las Flores. Later, in the late 1850s, he abandoned naturalism, his earlier style, exchanging it for a more graceful, elegant and supple technique that brought him a certain notoriety in France during his time as a portrait painter; as such he embraced the idyllic and voluptuous and fashionable style of the prominent French painter, François Boucher (1703–1770).

He also embraced the tradition of the great English portraitists. He developed his very own style of painting but was inspired by the British painters Joshua Reynolds and Thomas Gainsborough. He used to engrave the works of the Dutch artist Pieter Paul Rubens and gained further influence from his work.

=== Later work ===
Gradually the muddy colours used by Chaplin transformed into white, grey and pink, depicting his models with an opalescent, mother-of-pearl complexion by applying a subtle palette of rosy flesh tones and light greys. After painting portraits and trying his skills on ornamental painting, Chaplin took up genre painting in the 1850s. His favourite subjects are the feminine grace of a young woman's everyday life. He portrays women in several poses: resting; grooming; singing; and reading. He captures them with lightness and carelessness and accentuates the decorative elements of the composition.

Empress Eugénie, the wife of Napoleon III and an admirer of the "Pompadour style", rapidly fell under the enchantment of the painter's neo-Rococo works. Chaplin was among Napoleon III and Empress Eugénie's favourite court artists. In 1859, when his portrait of Aurora was banned by the judges of the Salon as "too erotically suggestive", Napoléon III defended Chaplin and overturned the disqualification order. He was similarly valued as an interior decorator and was appointed to remodel the decor of Empress Eugénie's rooms.

His sensual portraits of women and young girls, often with models posed erotically in hazy surroundings and frequently wearing transparent clothing, attracted the interest of the high society and aristocracy of Paris during the French Third Republic (1870–1940) guaranteeing his success and wealth. He was one of the most popular painters of his time, but nowadays his work is almost unknown, in spite of the fact that his works hang in many major museums around the world.

He employed his Rococo style for his mythological scenes and genre scenes paintings. His genre pictures formed a significant part of his work. In 1861, working as a decorative painter. Chaplin painted the doors and several glass panels above them of the Salon des Fleurs in the Tuileries Palace. The Palace was gutted by fire in 1871 and its ruins swiftly demolished. He also undertook decorating work in the Salon de l’Hémicycle of the Palais de l’Elysée.

=== Honours and awards ===
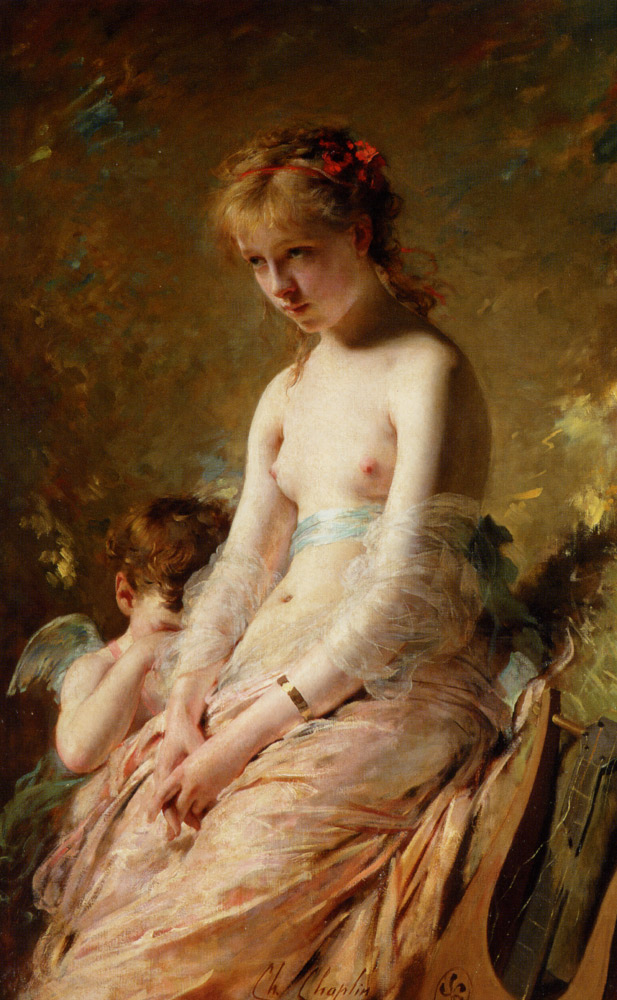
A Song Silenced, private collection

As a member of the Académie royale de peinture et de sculpture, Chaplin exhibited his paintings at the Paris Salon, the official exhibition venue of members' work. He began exhibiting his paintings at the French Artists' Salon of 1845 and was represented there habitually each year. These exhibitions made him one of France's most famous portrait artists. Commencing in 1847, his work was exhibited regularly at the Royal Academy in London.

He was awarded several medals for his works: a third class medal in 1851; a second class medal the following year; and an Honour Medal in 1865. He was declared Chevalier de la Légion d’Honneur in 1879, also known as The National Order of the Legion of Honour. Chaplin was elevated to Officier in 1881.

Chaplin's artistic talent was admired by renowned writers, painters and critics such as Arsène Houssaye, Émile Zola and Théophile Gautier. Édouard Manet felt Chaplin knew "the smile of a woman". It was his portraits of young women that gained him particular success.

His works can be viewed in the French museums of Bordeaux, Bayonne, Bourges, Mulhouse, Paris, Reims, Rouen, Saintes (Charente-Maritime), and the Louvre Museum Graphic Art Database. Outside France his works can be found in the Hermitage Museum, Saint Petersburg, at the Metropolitan Museum of Art, the Harvard Art Museums in Massachusetts and the Indianapolis Museum of Art in Indiana. Chaplin has several paintings in a public collection in the United Kingdom at the Bowes Museum.

One of Chaplin's paintings was sold at an auction in Paris on 5 June 1922. Described by the auctioneer as a landscape painting by Charles Chaplin, it achieved an unexpectedly high price for an artist considered to have "fallen into oblivion". Most of the bidders mistakenly believed it was a work of art by the comedian and actor Charlie Chaplin and thought they would acquire a remarkable find. The New York Times reported it stating: "The disappointment of the ultimate buyer may be imagined when it was discovered that the picture was by an almost forgotten artist."

Paintings by Charles Joshua Chaplin

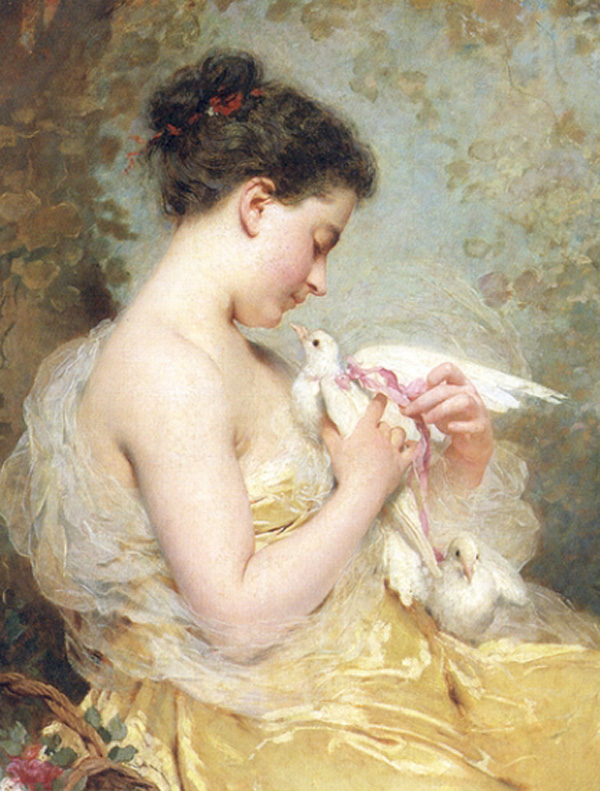
Young Girl with a Dove, private collection

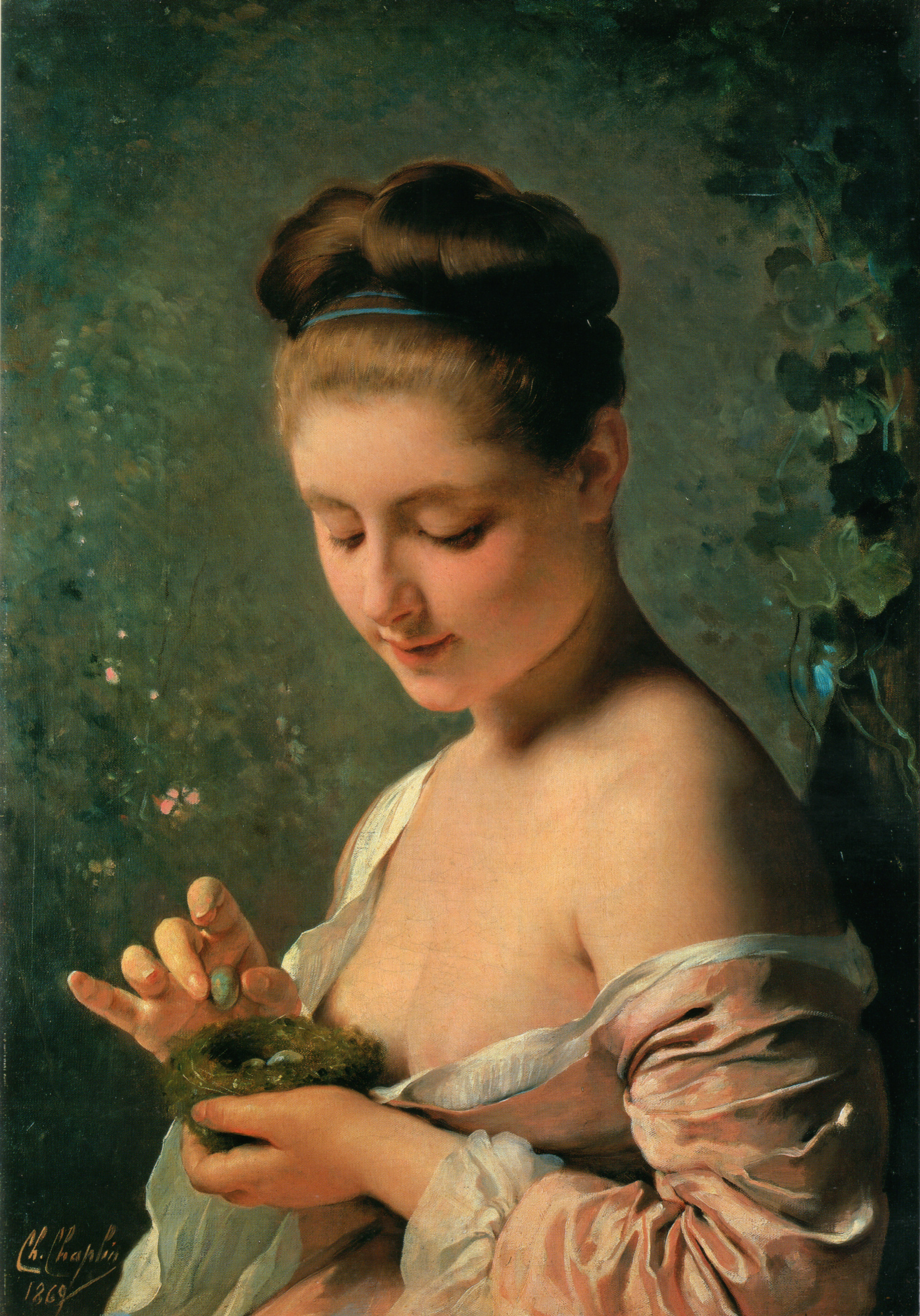
Young Girl with a Nest, 1869 Museum of Fine Arts of Lyon

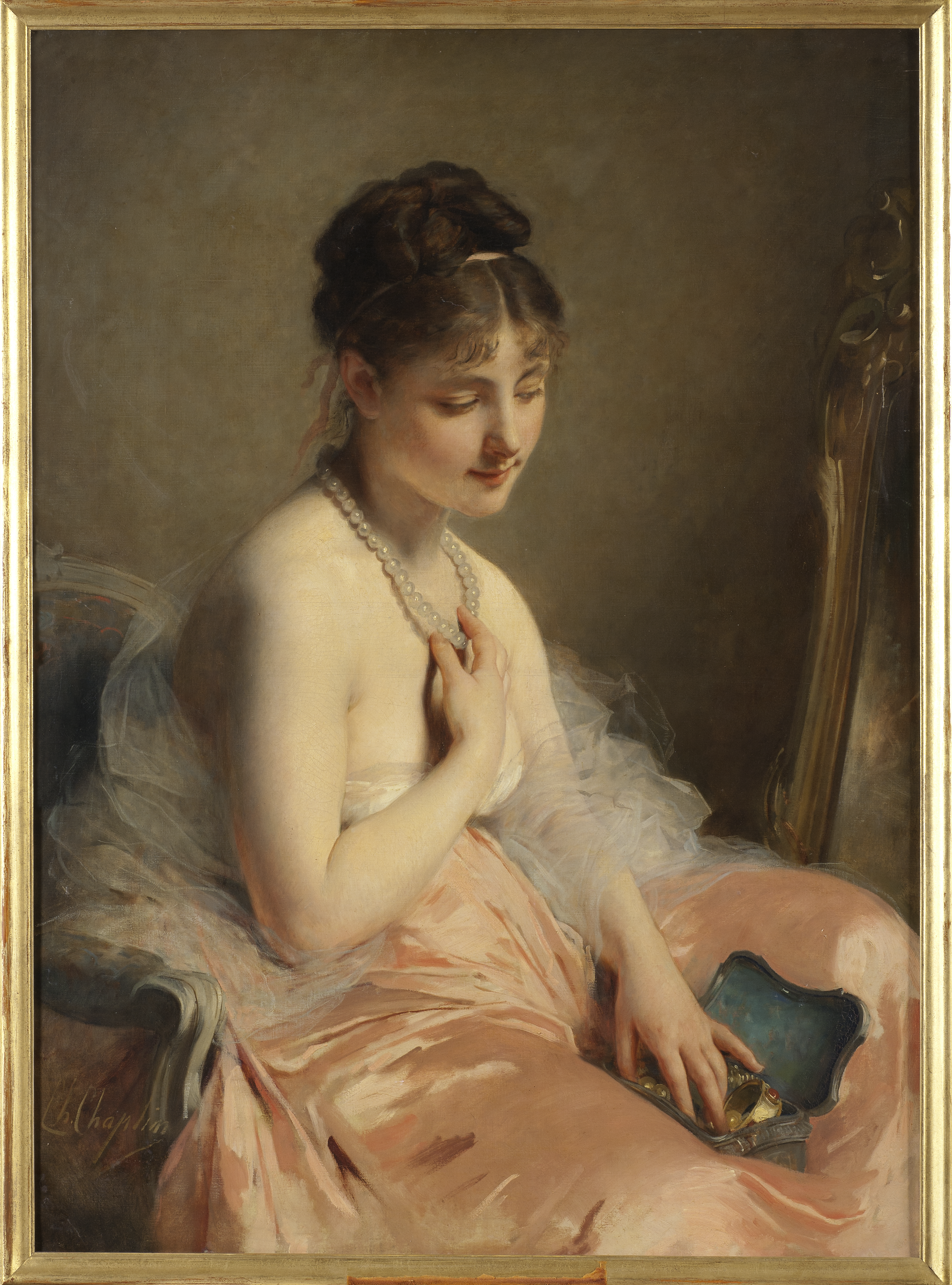
The Pearl-necklace, 1870s, Nationalmuseum, Stockholm

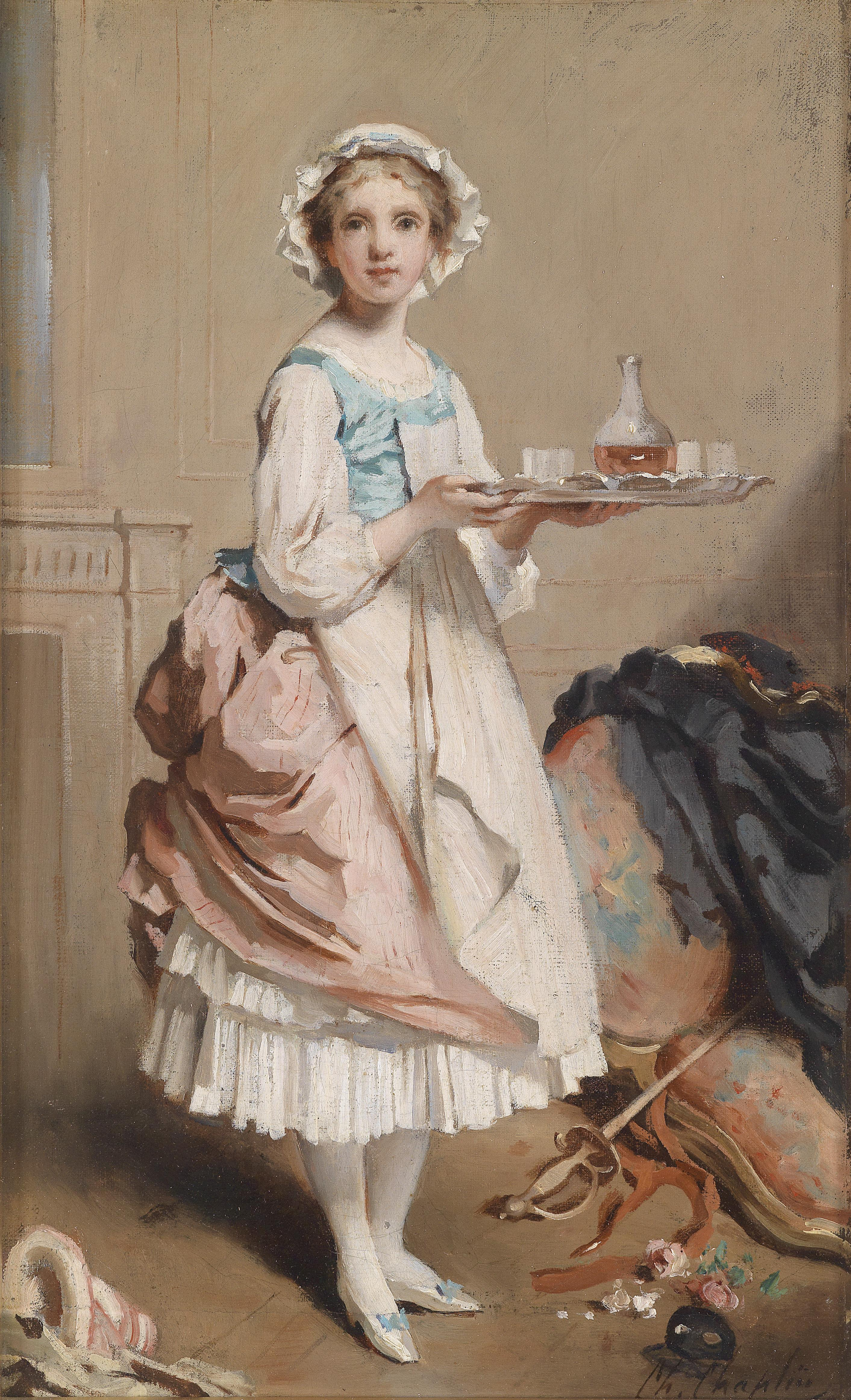
After The Ball, private collection

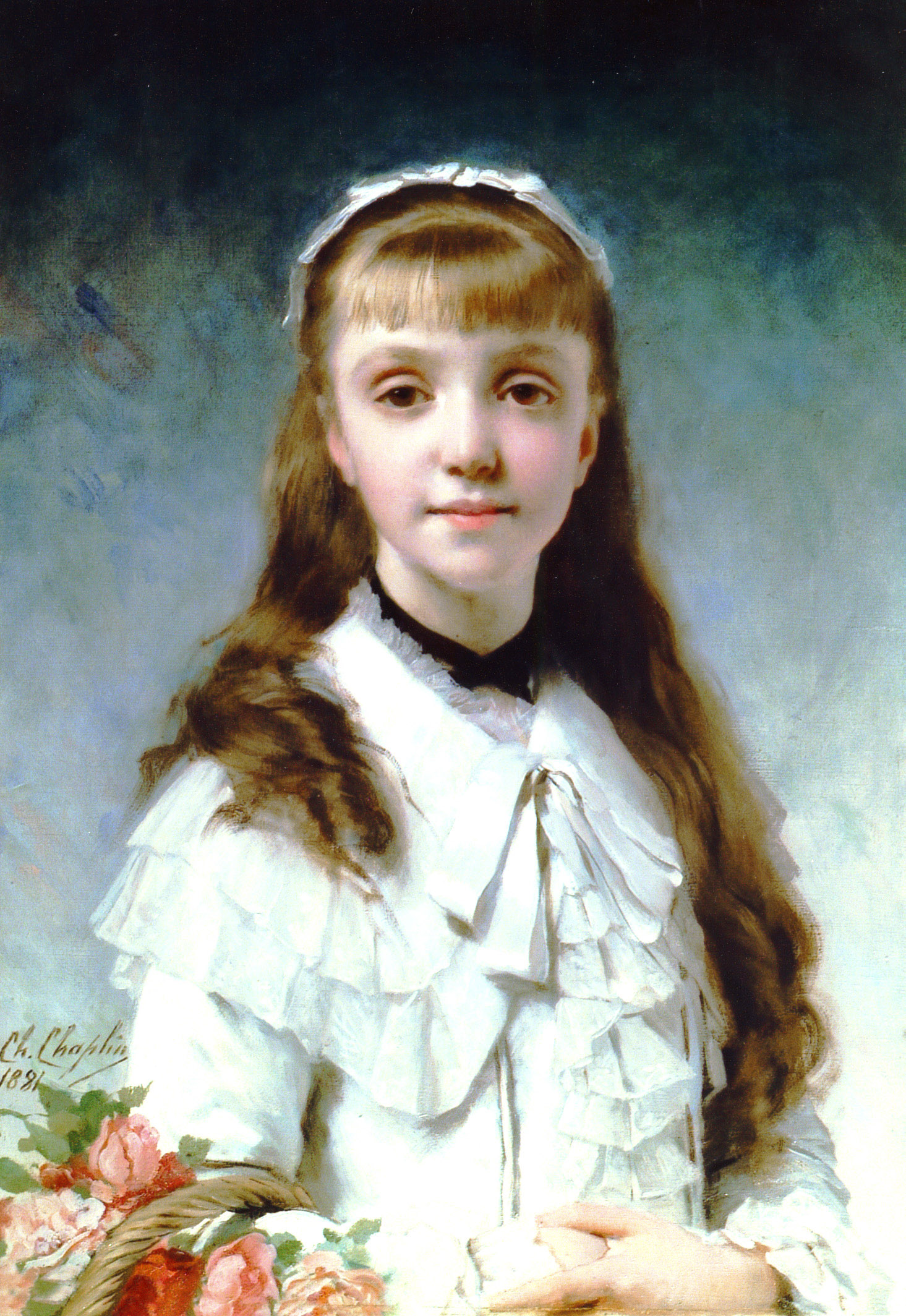
The Daughter of the Painter, private collection, 1881

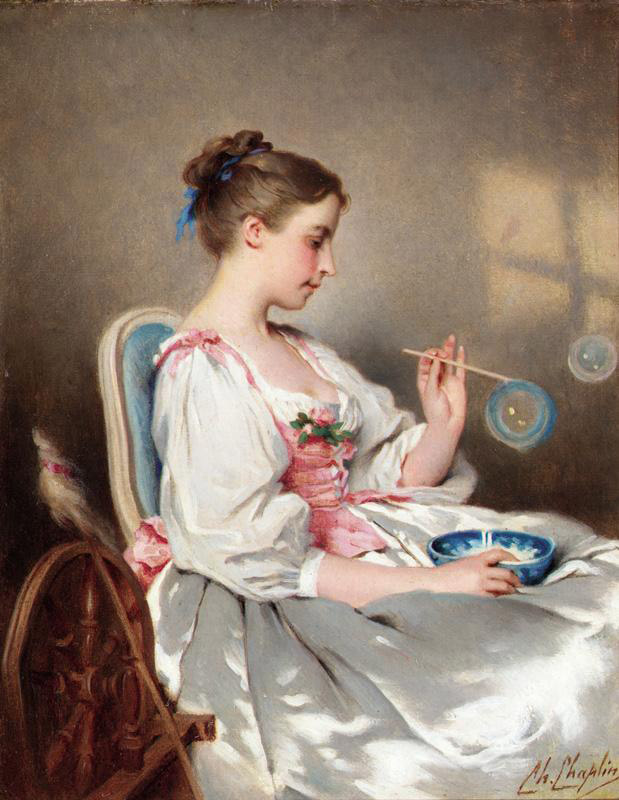
Blowing Bubbles, private collection

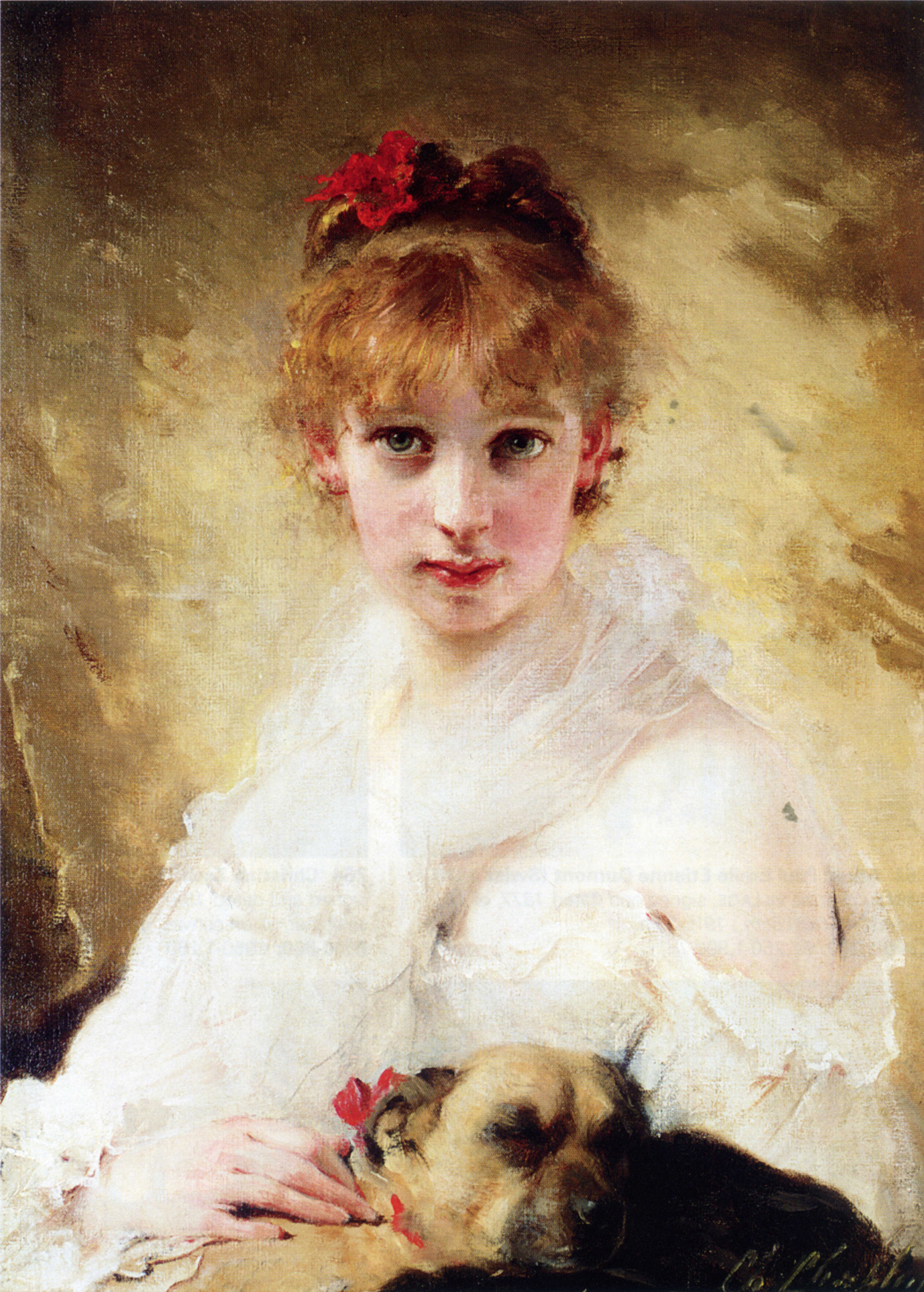
Her Favourite Dog, private collection

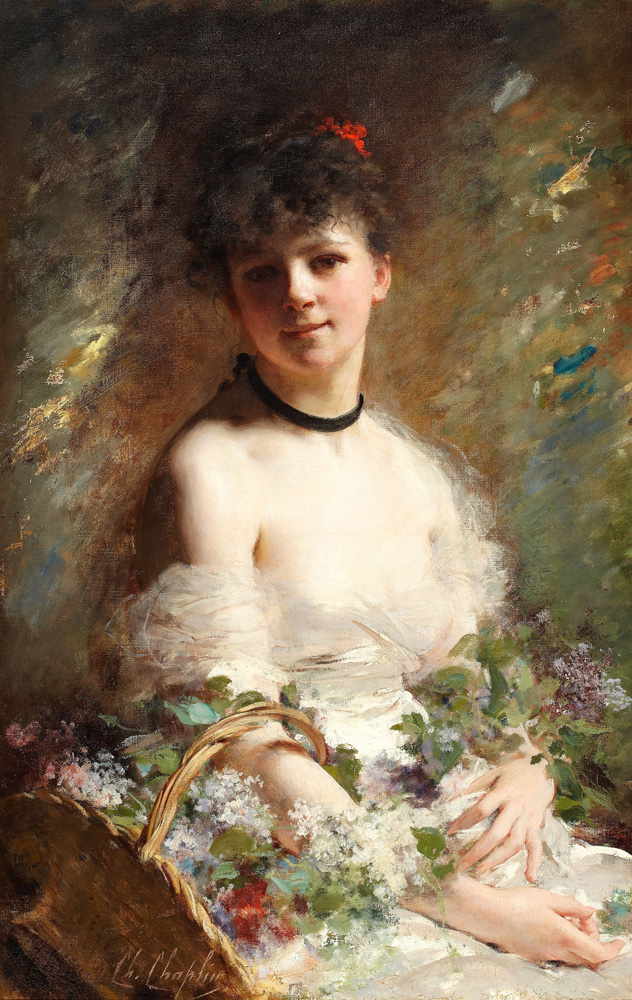
Young Woman with Flower Basket, private collection

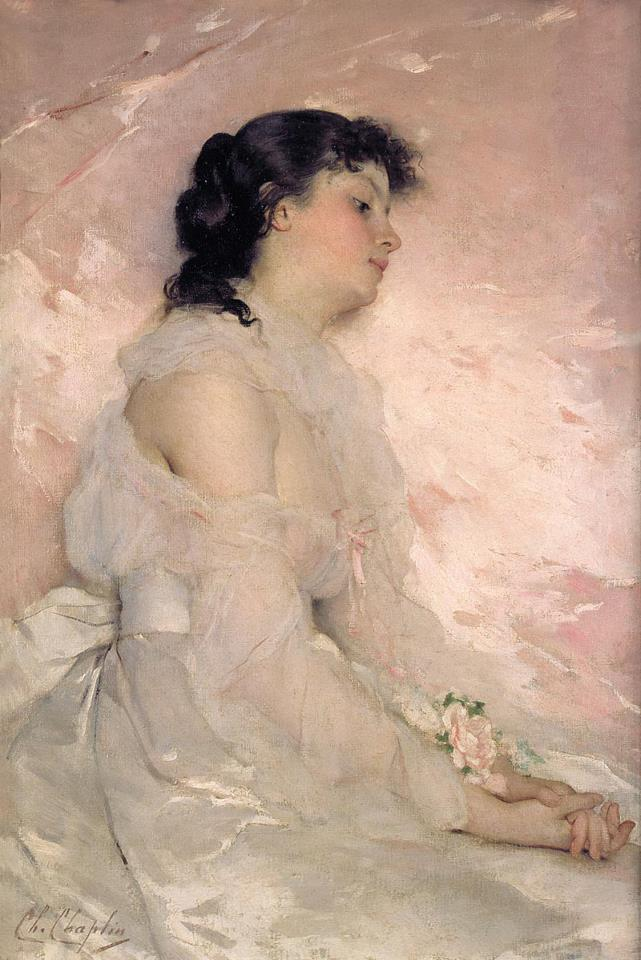
Rêverie, National Museum of Fine Arts in Buenos Aires
