= Louise Contat =

French actress (1760–1813)

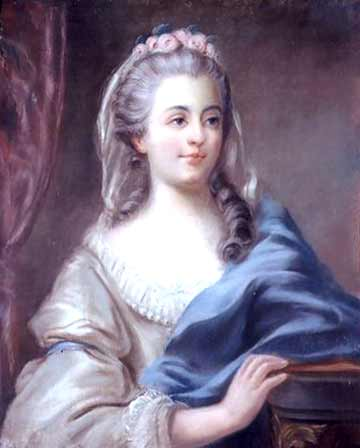
Louise Contat in the role of Suzanne, anonymous pastel attributed to Greuze (c. 1786).

Louise-Jeanne-Françoise Contat, called Contat the Elder (English: /kɒ̃ˈtɑː/ kon-TAH, French: [lwiz kɔ̃ta]; 16 June 1760 – 9 March 1813), was a French actress.

== Biography ==
She was born in Paris and made her debut at the Comédie Française in 1766 as Atalide in Bajazet. It was in comedy, however, that she made her first success, as Suzanne in Beaumarchais's Mariage de Figaro; and in several minor character parts, which she raised to the first importance, and as the soubrette in the plays of Molière and Pierre de Marivaux, she found opportunities exactly fitted to her talents.

By Louis Marie Jacques Amalric, vicomte de Narbonne-Lara (17, 23 or 24 August 1755 – 17 November 1813), soldier and diplomat, she had one daughter Louise Amalrique Bathilde Isidore Contat de Narbonne-Lara, born at Saint-Pierre-de-Chaillot, Paris, on 21 September 1788, who married in Paris on 2 December 1811 Dutch Jan Frederik Abbema, born in Amsterdam on 13 June 1773, and had one son Émile, vicomte d'Abbéma, who had an only daughter by his wife Henriette Anne d'Astoin named Louise Abbéma (Étampes, 30 October 1853 – Paris, 4 August 1927).

Bouillet writes of her "She played comedy to perfection and made people remark on the flexibility of her talent, succeeding equally as grandes coquettes and as soubrettes". She was part of the success of the plays of Marivaux and Beaumarchais. She left the theatre in 1808, and in 1809 married de Parny, nephew of the poet Évariste de Parny.

Her sister Marie-Émilie Contat (1769–1846), an admirable soubrette, especially as the pert servant drawn by Molière and de Regnard, made her debut in 1784, and retired, in 1815.

In his Memoirs of an Egotist, Stendhal writes that Mlle de Contat "was an inimitable actress" He also mentions her several times in his Journal, at one point declaring himself "astonished by her beauty," and representing "the astonishing delicacy of her nose" in a sketch.

== See also ==
- Troupe of the Comédie-Française in 1790
