= List of Nicaraguans =

This is a list of Nicaraguans and people of Nicaraguan ethnicity:

Republic of Nicaragua

Flag of Nicaragua

(Flag of Nicaragua)

Nicaraguan Coat of Arms

(Coat of Arms)

== Art ==
- Omar D'León (1928–2022), painter and poet.
- Franck de Las Mercedes (born 1972), painter.
- Armando Morales (1927–2011), painter.
- Hugo Palma-Ibarra (born 1942), painter.
- Róger Pérez de la Rocha (born 1949), painter.
- Julia Casimira Sacasa, (born 1972), abstract painter, sculptor, poet. CASIMIRA

== Business ==
- Harry Brautigam (1948–2008), economist, banker and academic.
- José Cardenal (born 1940), businessman.
- Michael Cordúa (born 1961), restaurateur, entrepreneur, businessman, award-winning self-taught chef.
- Carlos Reynaldo Lacayo (born 1950), businessman.
- Alejandro Lacayo (born 1951), businessman.
- Carlos Pellas Chamorro (born 1953), businessman, entrepreneur, Nicaragua's first billionaire.
- Alfonso Robelo (born 1939), businessman, politician, diplomat who served as ambassador to Costa Rica.
- Patrick Frawley (1923–1998) magnate (Paper Mate)

== Education ==
- Elena Arellano Chamorro (1836–1911), reform pedagogue, a pioneer for education of women.
- Josefa Toledo de Aguerri (1866–1962), reform pedagogue, general director of education in the 1920s.

== Fashion, models and beauty queens ==
- Xiomara Blandino (born 1984), Miss Nicaragua 2007, model.
- Nastassja Bolívar, Nuestra Belleza Latina 2011 – Miss Nicaragua 2013 – and Top 16 in Miss Universe 2013 -The Best National Costume.
- Iva Grijalva Pashova (born 1986), Miss Earth Nicaragua 2007.
- Beatriz Obregon Lacayo, Miss Nicaragua 1977
- Thelma Rodríguez (born 1989), Miss Nicaragua 2008.
- Sheynnis Palacios (born 2000), Miss Nicaragua 2023, Miss Universe 2023.

== Government and politics ==
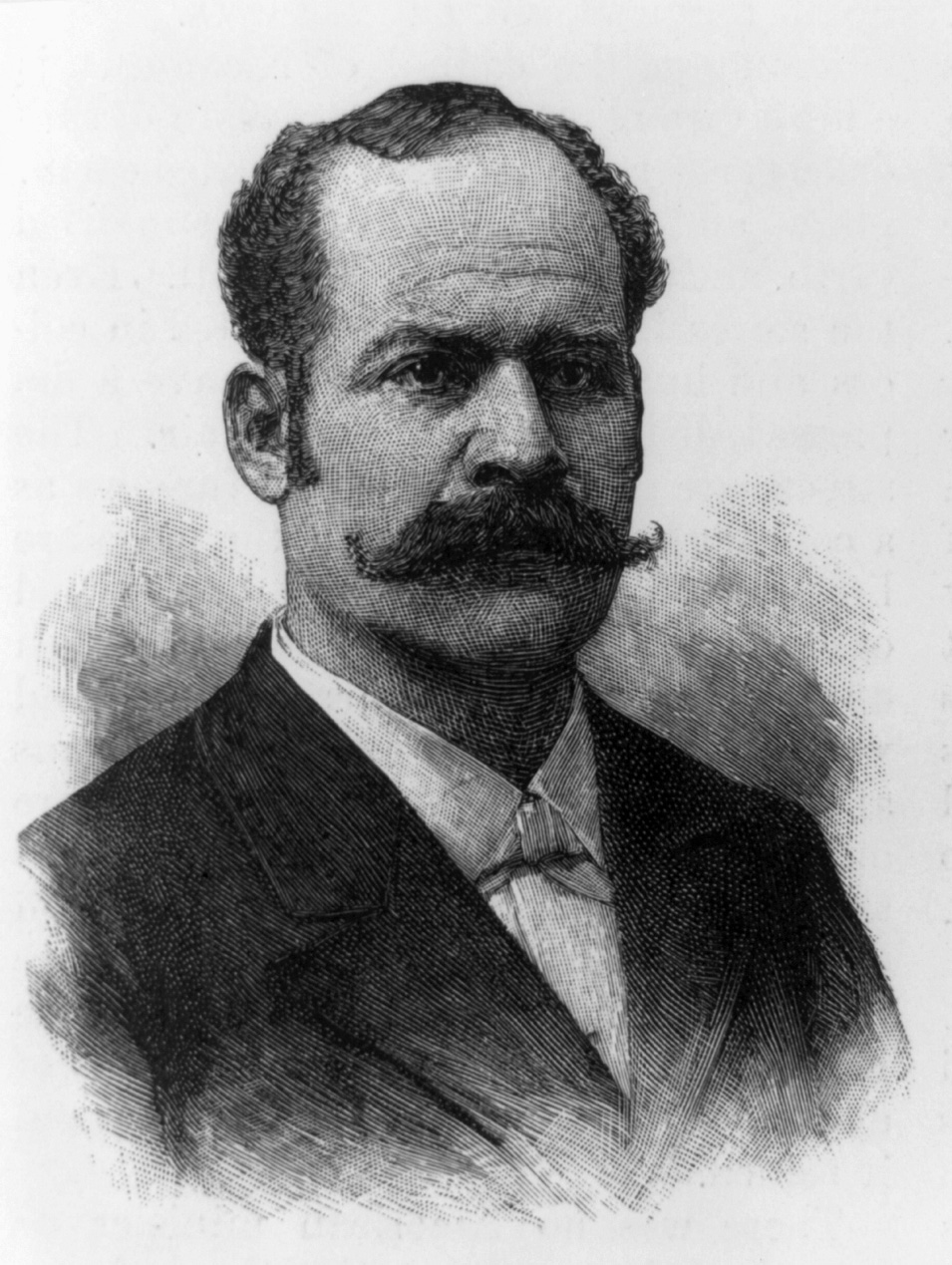
José Santos Zelaya, president of Nicaragua from 1893 to 1909.

- Lila T. Abaunza (1929–2008), First Lady of Nicaragua from 2002 to 2007.
- Fernando Agüero (born 1920), politician.
- Arnoldo Alemán (born 1946), former president of Nicaragua from 1997 to 2002.
- Leonardo Argüello Barreto (1895–1947), President of Nicaragua (1947).
- Miguel d'Escoto Brockmann (born 1933), former Foreign Minister of Nicaragua (1979–1990), President of the 63rd UN General Assembly (2008–2009) and leading liberation theologian.
- Juan Bautista Sacasa (1874–1946), President of Nicaragua from 1933 to 1936.
- Claudia Bermúdez (born 1954), Nicaragua-American politician and entrepreneur; first Nicaraguan American to be the nominee of a major party for a seat in the United States Congress.
- Enrique Bolaños (1928–2021), President of Nicaragua from 2002 to 2007.
- Róger Calero (born 1969), Nicaraguan American who ran for U.S. President in the 2004 elections.
- Adolfo Calero (1931–2012), leader of the Contra-Revolutionary Movement.
- Emiliano Chamorro (1871–1966), President of Nicaragua from 1917 to 1920 and part of 1926.
- Fruto Chamorro (1804–1855), first president of Nicaragua 1854–1855.
- Manuel Coronel Kautz, vice minister of foreign relations.
- Arturo Cruz (born 1923), politician and diplomat.
- Pedro Joaquín Chamorro Alfaro (1875–1879), President of Nicaragua from 1875 to 1879.
- Violeta Chamorro (born 1929), first female president in Latin America, second in North America and 48th President of Nicaragua.
- Adolfo Díaz (1875–1964), President of Nicaragua in 1911–1917 and 1926–1929.
- George William Albert Hendy (1879–1888), Hereditary Chief of Miskito Nation.
- Edmundo Jarquín (born 1946), politician, candidate for president of Nicaragua in 2006.
- Máximo Jerez (1818–1881), politician, lawyer, and military leader in 19th century Nicaragua.
- Herty Lewites (1939–2006), politician.
- Angel Bravo Lorio, politician, Communist Party of Nicaragua
- Eduardo Montealegre (1955), politician, businessman.
- Oldman (died 1687), King of the Miskito Nation from 1625 to 1687.
- Daniel Ortega (born 1945), current President of Nicaragua, leader of the FSLN.
- Edén Pastora (1937–2020), politician.
- Mariano Prado (1776–1837), lawyer and a four-time, liberal chief of state of El Salvador.
- Sergio Ramírez (born 1943), Vice President of Nicaragua during the Junta, writer, intellectual.
- Jorge Salazar Argüello (1939–1980), Nicaraguan coffee grower and popular leader of UPANIC (Union of Agricultural Producers of Nicaragua – Unión de Productores Agropecuarios de Nicaragua), seemed poised to become the leader of the opposition to the Sandinista government, until his death at the hands of State Security forces.
- José Santos Zelaya (1853–1919), president of Nicaragua from 1893 to 1909.
- Guillermo Sevilla-Sacasa (1908–1997), Ambassador of Nicaragua to the United States (1943–1979), Dean of the Diplomatic Corps (1958–1979), Washington, DC
- Hilda Solis (born 1957), U.S. congresswoman.
- Anastasio Somoza García (1896–1956), 34th and 39th President of Nicaragua
- Anastasio Somoza Debayle (1925–1980), 44th and 45th President of Nicaragua from 1967 to 1972 and from 1974 to 1979.
- Luis Somoza Debayle (1922–1967), 40th President of Nicaragua from 1956 to 1963.

== Journalism ==
- Pedro Joaquín Chamorro Cardenal (1924–1978), editor of La Prensa daily newspaper, assassinated.
- Xavier Chamorro Cardenal (1932–2008), co-founder, director and editor of El Nuevo Diario.
- Enrique Gottel (1831–1875), journalist, music composer, and historian.
- Carlos Javier Jarquín (born 1990), journalist and cultural activist.
- Mari Ramos, weather anchor for CNN.

== Literature ==
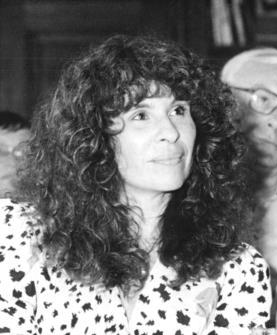
Gioconda Belli was designated amongst the 100 most important poets during the 20th century.

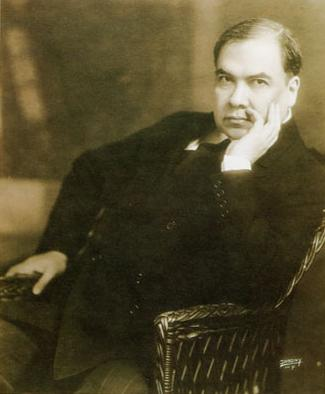
Rubén Darío in 1915.

- Claribel Alegría (1924–2018), poet, she received the Neustadt International Prize for Literature in 2006.
- Emilio Álvarez Lejarza (1884–1969), writer.
- Emilio Álvarez Montalván (1919–2014), political writer.
- Eugenio Batres Garcia (born 1941) noted newscaster and journalist, writer, author and poet.
- Gioconda Belli (born 1948), poet and writer.
- Yolanda Blanco (born 1954), poet and translator.
- Tomás Borge (1930–2012), writer, poet, politician and essayist.
- Omar Cabezas (born 1950), writer.
- Ernesto Cardenal (1925–2020), poet.
- Blanca Castellón (born 1958), poet.
- José Coronel Urtecho (1906–1994), poet, translator, essayist, critic, narrator, playwright and historian.
- Alfonso Cortés (1893–1969), poet.
- Arturo Cruz (born 1954), writer.
- Pablo Antonio Cuadra (1912–2002), poet.
- Rubén Darío (1867–1916), poet, referred to as The Father of Modernism.
- Karly Gaitán Morales (born 1980) film historian, writer, journalist.
- Salomón Ibarra Mayorga (1887–1985), poet and lyricist of "Salve a ti, Nicaragua", the Nicaraguan national anthem.
- Erwin Krüger (1915–1973), poet and composer.
- Rigoberto López Pérez (1929–1936), poet and writer.
- Francisco Mayorga (born 1949), writer.
- Christianne Meneses Jacobs (born 1971), writer, editor, and publisher.
- Rosario Murillo (born 1951), poet.
- Azarías H. Pallais (1884–1954), poet.
- Joaquín Pasos (1914–1947), poet.
- Horacio Peña (born 1946), writer and poet.
- Sergio Ramírez (born 1942), writer.
- Aura Rostand (1899–1957), poet.
- Mariana Sansón Argüello (1918–2002), poet.
- Arlen Siu (1955–1972), essayist.
- Julio Valle Castillo (born 1952), poet, novelist, essayist, and a critic of literature and art.
- Daisy Zamora (born 1950), poet.

== Military and police ==
- Enrique Bermúdez (1932–1991), military and political leader of the Nicaraguan Contras from 1979 to 1991.
- Fernando Chamorro Alfaro (1824–1863), general and member of the governing junta of Nicaragua (1860–1863).
- Aminta Granera (born 1952), police chief of Nicaragua.
- Aristides Sánchez (died 1993), key figure among the Contras.
- Anastasio Somoza Portocarrero (born 1951), former commander of the National Guard.

== Movies and TV entertainment ==
- Maurice Benard (born 1963), actor on American soap operas All My Children and General Hospital
- Barbara Carrera (born 1945), film, TV actress, former model.
- Oswaldo Castillo, actor, most notable role includes the one in The Hammer.
- Edward'O, notable astroanalyst and co-host of Telemundo's dating show, 12 Corazones.
- Gabriel Traversari (born 1963), actor, director, writer, singer, songwriter and painter.
- Gabriela Revilla, writer, producer, director

== Music ==
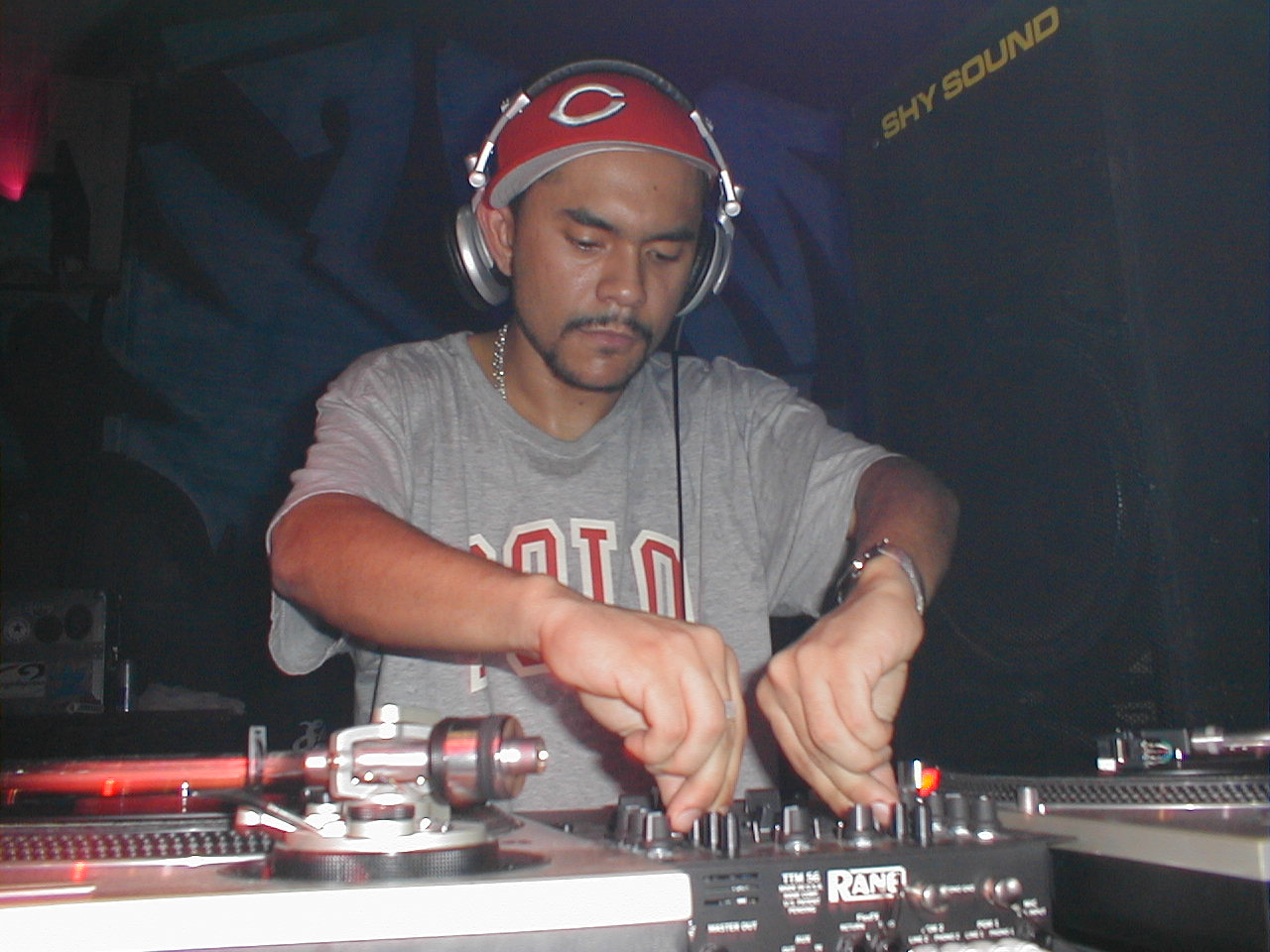
DJ Craze at a rave in 2002

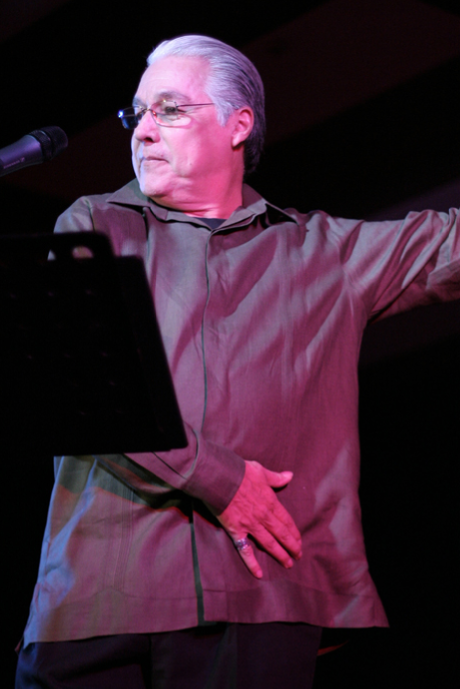
Singer songwriter Luis Enrique Mejía Godoy

- José Areas (born 1946), percussionist, former drummer for Santana.
- Lya Barrioz, singer and actress.
- Katia Cardenal (born 1963), singer-songwriter from Duo Guardabarranco.
- Dimension Costeña, musicians.
- Erwin Krüger (1915–1973), singer and Nicaraguan folklore poet.
- Luis Enrique Mejía López (born 1962), salsa singer and music composer.
- Carlos Mejía Godoy (born 1943), musician, composer, singer.
- Alfonso Noel Lovo (born 1951), composer and guitarist.
- Tony Melendez (born 1962), guitar player, singer and Christian rock songwriter who was born without arms.
- Maria Mena, Norwegian/Nicaraguan pop singer.
- Otto Benjamín de la Rocha López (born 1933), singer, songwriter and radio actor.
- T-Bone (born 1973), rapper.
- Torombolo (born 1985), reggaeton and hip hop singer.
- J Smooth, bilingual hip hop and Reggaeton singer.
- Donald Vega (born 1974), jazz musician and composer.
- Hernaldo Zúñiga (born 1955), singer and music composer.

== Non-Governmental Organizations ==
- Reinaldo Aguado Montealegre (born 1960), President of the International Society for Human Rights in Nicaragua.
- Aubry Campbell Ingram (1903–2000), baseball player who helped found the Asociación de Scouts de Nicaragua.
- Myrna Cunningham, Miskita indigenous rights activist and physician.
- Joseph A. Harrison (1883–1964), Moravian Pastor who helped start the first scout troop in Nicaragua.
- Bianca Jagger (born 1945), social and political activist, former wife of Mick Jagger.
- Mario Sacasa, Director, Future of Nicaragua Foundation, Fundación Futuro de Nicaragua

== Religion ==
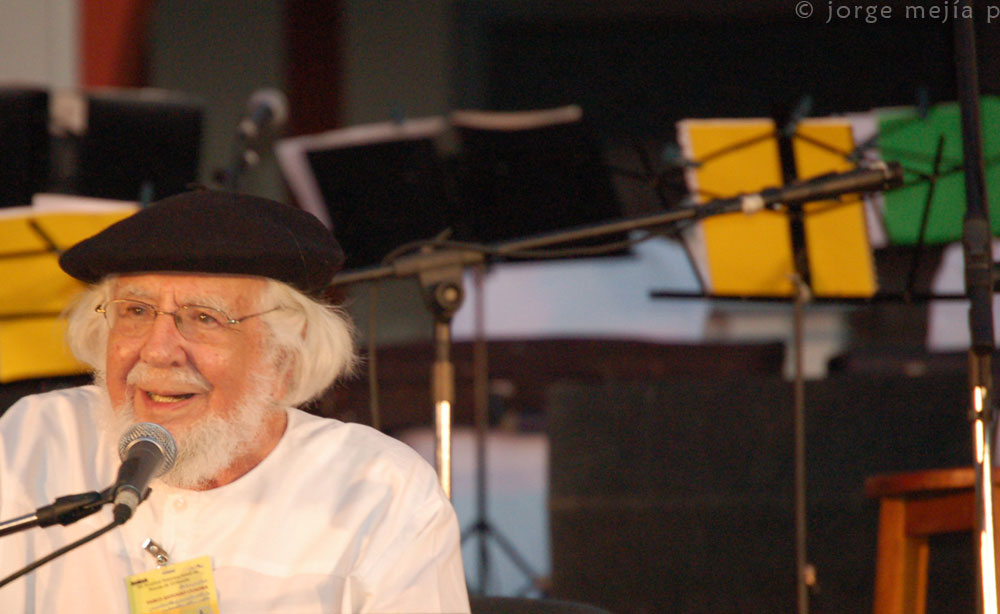
Ernesto Cardenal is a poet, Roman Catholic priest and a famous liberation theologian.

- Reyna I. Aburto (born 1963), religious leader of the Church of Jesus Christ of Latter-day Saints
- Leopoldo Brenes (born 1949), Archbishop of Managua, cardinal.
- Ernesto Cardenal (born 1925), Catholic priest and liberation theologian.
- Fernando Cardenal (born 1934), Jesuit priest, director at the Fe y Alegría organization in Managua.
- Miguel D'Escoto Brockmann (1933–2017), Roman Catholic priest, former foreign minister of Nicaragua, received the Lenin Peace Prize in 1985.
- Uriel Molina Oliú (born 1932), Franciscan priest.
- Pablo Antonio Vega Mantilla (1919–2007), Roman Catholic bishop and bishop Emeritus.
- Maria Romero Meneses (1902–1977), Salesian nun, beatified in 2002.
- Miguel Obando y Bravo (born 1926), archbishop emeritus of Managua, cardinal.
- Jesus Rojas (1950–1991), Jesuit priest.

== Revolutionaries ==
- Patrick Argüello (1943–1970), Popular Front for the Liberation of Palestine.
- Nora Astorga (1948–1988), Sandinista revolutionary, lawyer, politician, judge and Nicaraguan ambassador to the UN.
- Benigna Mendiola (born 1944), Sandinista revolutionary and peasant leader
- Antonio Cardenal Caldera (1951–1991), also known as Jesus Rojas, major leader of the Farabundo Martí National Liberation Front.
- Arturo Cruz, Jr. (born 1954), revolutionary, writer, professor and diplomat.
- Rigoberto Cruz (died 1967), one of the founders of the FSLN.
- Ajax Delgado (1941–1960), student activist of the Sandinista revolution.
- José Dolores Estrada (1792–1869), famed for his part in the battle Hacienda San Jacinto in 1856.
- Idania Fernandez (1952–1979), Sandinista revolutionary.
- Carlos Fonseca (1936–1976), teacher, founder of FSLN.
- Maximo Jerez (1818–1876), lawyer, politician, general, president.
- Augusto César Sandino (1895–1934), revolutionary, symbol of the FSLN.
- Arlen Siu (1955–1972), Sandinista revolutionary.
- Dora María Téllez (born 1947), Sandinista revolutionary, founded the MRS, historian.

== Science ==
- Clodomiro Picado Twight (1887–1944), Pasteur Institute, biologists whose work on molds was a precursor to the formal discovery of penicillin.
- Pedro Jose Alvarez (born 1958), Rice University, environmental engineer and scientist, pioneer of bioremediation and environmental nanotechnology.
- Gabriel Montoya (born 2005), Purdue University, biomedical engineer.

== Sports ==
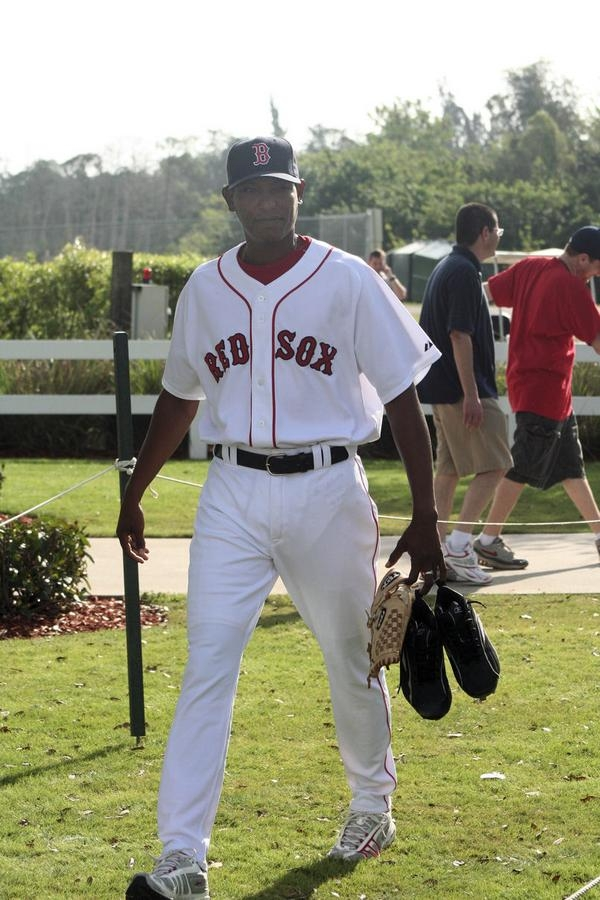
Devern Hansack, former professional baseball player, pitching for the Boston Red Sox.

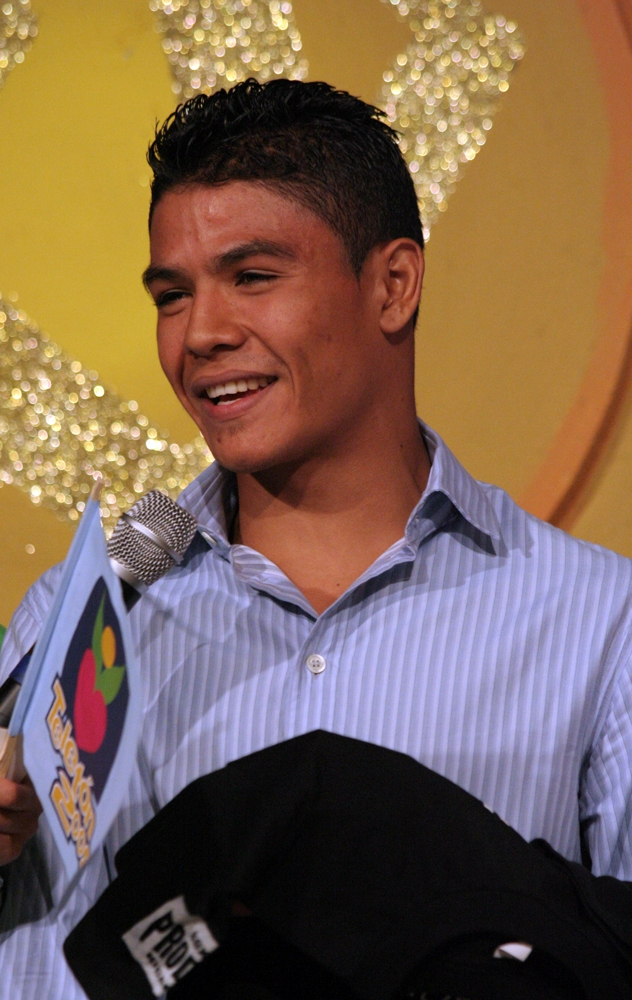
José "Quiebra Jícara" Alfaro, boxer; world champion

=== Baseball ===
- Porfirio Altamirano (born 1952), former Major League Baseball player.
- Marvin Benard (born 1970), former Major League Baseball player.
- Everth Cabrera (born 1986), Major League Baseball player.
- Tony Chévez (born 1954), Major League Baseball player.
- Cheslor Cuthbert (born 1992), Major League Baseball player.
- David Green (born 1960), former Major League Baseball player.
- Devern Hansack (born 1978), current Major League Baseball player.
- Wilton López (born 1983), former Major League Baseball player.
- Oswaldo Mairena (born 1975), Major League Baseball player.
- Dennis Martínez (born 1955), first Nicaraguan to play in Major League Baseball, pitched the 13th ever perfect game in major league history.
- Vicente Padilla (born 1977), current Major League Baseball player.
- Erasmo Ramirez (born 1990), Major League Baseball player.
- J. C. Ramirez (born 1988), Major League Baseball player.

=== Boxing ===
- Román González (born 1987), boxer, world champion.
- José Alfaro (born 1983), boxer, world champion.
- Rosendo Alvarez (born 1970), boxer, former world champion.
- Alexis Argüello (1952–2009), boxer, former three-division world champion.
- Julio Gamboa (born 1971), lightweight boxer.
- Eddie Gazo (born 1950), super welterweight world champion boxer.
- Ricardo Mayorga (born 1973), boxer, former WBA/WBC Welterweight champion and WBC Junior Middleweight world champion.
- David Obregon (born 1978), professional boxer.
- Juan Palacios (born 1980), professional boxer, reigning WBC Interim Minimumweight World champion.
- Luis Alberto Pérez (born 1978), boxer, former IBF world junior-bantamweight champion.
- Adonis Rivas (born 1972), boxer, former world champion.
- Roberto Arriaza (born 1990) former WBO NABF Welterweight champion.
- Yokasta Valle (born 1992), current female IBF and WBO junior flyweight champion.

=== Football (soccer) ===
- Armando Collado (born 1985), professional soccer player.
- Denis Espinoza (born 1983), professional soccer player.
- Tatiana Guzmán (born 1987), FIFA soccer referee and former soccer player.
- Shawn Hasani Martin (born 1987), professional soccer player.
- Emilio Palacios (born 1982), professional soccer player, Nicaraguan to score a hat-trick in an international competition.
- Wilber Sanchez (born 1979), professional soccer player.
- Simrry Villareyna (born 1994), soccer player.
- Samuel Wilson (born 1983), professional soccer player who currently plays for Atletico Olanchano.

=== Martial arts ===
- Diana López (born 1984), Olympic bronze medalist in the sport of taekwondo.
- Mark López (born 1982), Olympic silver medalist in the sport of taekwondo.
- Steven López (born 1978), first official Olympic gold medalist in the sport of taekwondo.
- Jason González (born 1990), fighter in the UFC Lightweight division

=== Swimming ===
- Claudia Poll (born 1972), swimmer, won the gold medal at the 1996 Summer Olympics.
- Silvia Poll (born 1970), swimmer, won the silver medal at the 1988 Summer Olympics.

=== Other sports ===
- Jessica Aguilera (born 1985), track and field sprint athlete, competed in the 2008 Beijing Olympics.
- Karla Moreno (born 1988), weightlifter, competed in the 2008 Beijing Olympics.
