= List of Nicaraguan writers =

A list of Nicaraguan writers, including novelists, poets, authors, essayists, journalists, critics, and narrators among others.

== List ==
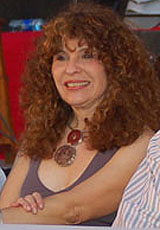
Gioconda Belli, designated amongst the 100 most important poets during the 20th century.

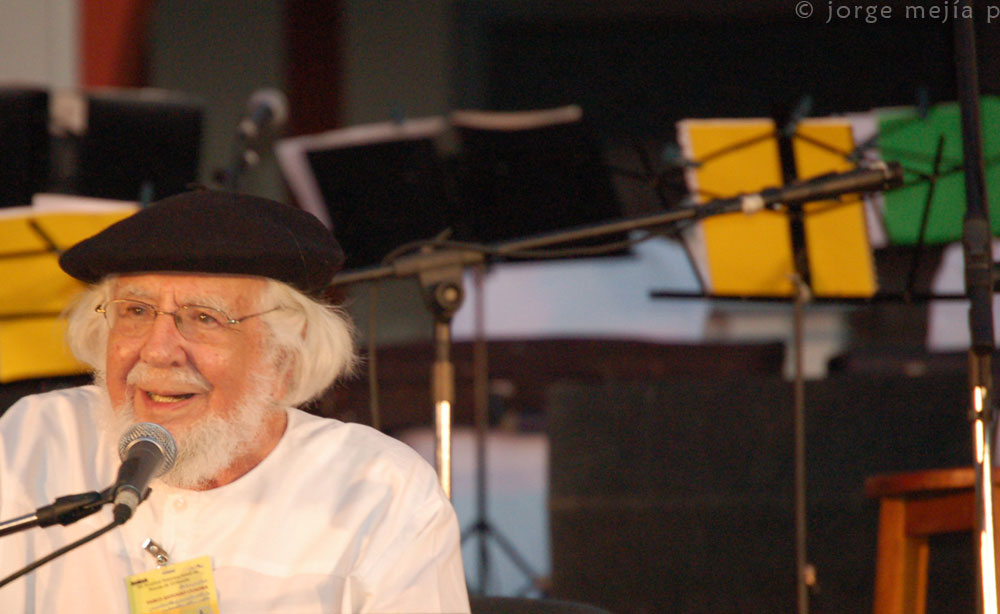
Ernesto Cardenal is a poet, Catholic priest and was one of the most famous liberation theologians of the Sandinista Regime.

Karly Gaitán Morales is a Nicaraguan film historian and writer.

- Claribel Alegría (1924–2018), poet, she received the Neustadt International Prize for Literature in 2006.
- Emilio Álvarez Lejarza (1884–1969), writer
- Emilio Álvarez Montalván (1919–2014), political writer
- June Beer (1935–1986) Afro-Nicaraguan poet and artist.
- Gioconda Belli (1948), poet
- Yolanda Blanco (1954), poet and translator.
- Tomás Borge (1930–2012), writer, poet, and essayist.
- Omar Cabezas (1950), writer
- Ernesto Cardenal (1925–2020), poet
- Blanca Castellón (1958), poet
- José Coronel Urtecho (1906–1994), poet, translator, essayist, critic, narrator, playwright, and historian.
- Alfonso Cortés (1893–1969), poet
- Arturo Cruz (1954), writer
- Pablo Antonio Cuadra (1912–2002), poet
- Rubén Darío (1867–1916), poet, referred to as The Father of Modernism
- Carlos Javier Jarquín (1990), poet, journalist and cultural activist
- Omar D'León (1929–2022), poet
- Karly Gaitán Morales (born 1980), Nicaraguan film historian, and writer.
- Ana Ilce Gómez Ortega (1944–2017), poet
- Salomón Ibarra Mayorga (1887–1985), poet and lyricist of "Salve a ti, Nicaragua", the Nicaraguan national anthem.
- Erwin Krüger (1915–1973), poet and composer.
- Rigoberto López Pérez (1929–1956), poet and writer.
- Francisco Mayorga (1949), writer
- Camilo Mejía (1975), author
- Tony Meléndez (1962), writer
- Rosario Murillo (1951), poet
- Humberto Ortega (1947–2024), author
- Azarías H. Pallais (1884–1954), poet
- Joaquín Pasos (1914–1947), poet
- Horacio Peña (1946), writer and poet
- Sergio Ramírez (1942), writer
- Aura Rostand (1899–1957), poet
- Mariana Sansón Argüello (1918–2002), poet
- Arlen Siu (1955–1975), essayist
- Julio Valle Castillo (1952), poet, novelist, essayist, literary critic and art critic
- Daisy Zamora (1950), poet

== See also ==
- List of Nicaraguan women writers
