= Emilio (given name) =

Emilio is a given name common in the Italian and Spanish languages. The Portuguese-language version of the name is spelled Emílio. Like its counterpart in other languages, Emil, the name is derived from the Latin Aemilius of the gens Aemilia. Notable people and characters with the name Emilio or Emílio include:

== People ==
=== Emilio ===
==== A–E ====
- Emilio Aceval, President of Paraguay
- Emilio Aguinaldo, Filipino general and President of the Philippines
- Emilio Aguirre (1914–1995), Mexican-American army veteran
- Emilio Aldecoa, Spanish association football player
- Emilio Álvarez (Uruguayan footballer), Uruguayan association football player
- Emilio Álvarez Icaza, president of the Human Rights Commission of the Mexican Federal District
- Emilio Álvarez Lejarza, Nicaraguan government official and jurist
- Emilio Álvarez Montalván, Nicaraguan ophthalmologist and a former Foreign Minister of Nicaragua
- Emilio Amero, Mexican artist
- Emilio Arenales Catalán, foreign minister of Guatemala and the president of the United Nations
- Emilio Arrieta, Spanish composer
- Emilio Artom, Italian mathematician
- Emilio Azcárraga Jean, Mexican businessman and Televisa owner
- Emilio Azcárraga Milmo, Mexican businessman and Televisa owner
- Emilio Azcárraga Vidaurreta, Mexican businessman and Televisa owner
- Emilio Baldonedo, Argentine footballer
- Emilio Banfi, Italian track and field athlete
- Emilio Barzini, fictional character in Mario Puzo's novel The Godfather
- Emilio Bello, Chilean lawyer, diplomat and President of the Government Junta that ruled Chile in 1925
- Emilio Benfele Álvarez, Spanish tennis player
- Emilio Betti, Italian jurist, Roman Law scholar, philosopher and theologian
- Emilio Bizzi, American neuroscientist and Massachusetts Institute of Technology professor
- Emilio Bonifacio, Dominican Major League Baseball infielder
- Emilio Botín, Spanish banker
- Emilio Brambilla, Italian athlete
- Emilio Bulgarelli, Italian water polo player and Olympic athlete
- Emilio Butragueño, Spanish association football player
- Emilio Campos, Venezuelan association football player
- Emilio Carranza, Mexican aviator and national hero
- Emilio Castelar y Ripoll, Spanish republican and president of the First Spanish Republic
- Emilio Castillo, American saxophone player and composer
- Emilio de' Cavalieri, Italian composer, producer, organist, diplomat, choreographer and dancer
- Emilio Cavenecia, Peruvian military hero
- Emilio Coia, Italian-Scottish artist
- Emilio Colombo, Italian diplomat and politician
- Emilio Comici, Italian mountain climber
- Emilio Commisso, Argentine association football player
- Emilio Comte, Argentine actor
- Emilio Cornalia, Italian naturalist
- Emilio Q. Daddario, American politician
- Emilio Daez, Filipino actor
- Emilio De Bono, Italian General, fascist activist, Marshal, and member of the Fascist Grand Council
- Emilio Delgado, American actor
- Emilio Diez Barroso, Mexican businessman
- Emilio Disi, Argentine actor
- Emilio Echevarría, Mexican actor
- Emilio Esteban Infantes, Spanish general
- Emilio Estefan, Cuban-American musician and producer
- Emilio Estevez, American actor, director, and writer
- Emilio Estevez Tsai, Taiwanese association football player
- Emilio Estrada, President of Ecuador

==== F–M ====
- Emilio Falero, Cuban artist
- Emilio Fede, Italian anchorman and journalist
- Emilio Fernández, Mexican actor and screenwriter
- Emilio Ferrera, Belgian association football player and coach
- Emilio Floris, Italian politician
- Emilio Fraietta, Canadian football player
- Emilio Frugoni, Uruguayan socialist politician, lawyer, poet, essayist, and journalist
- Emilio A. De La Garza, United States Marine Corps lance corporal
- Emilio M. Garza, US Judge
- Emilio García Gómez, Spanish Arabist, literary historian, and critic
- Emilio Gavira, Spanish actor
- Emilio Gnutti, Italian financier
- Emilio de Gogorza, Spanish-American baritone singer
- Emilio Gómez (disambiguation), several people
- Emilio González Márquez, Mexican politician and governor of Jalisco
- Emilio T. Gonzalez, head of USCIS (United States Citizenship and Immigration Services)
- Emilio Grau Sala, Catalan painter
- Emilio Gutiérrez Caba, Spanish actor
- Emilio Gutiérrez González, Spanish association football player
- Emilio Herrera Linares, Spanish military engineer
- Emilio Izaguirre, Honduran association football player
- Emilio J. M. de Carvalho, Angolan Bishop of the United Methodist Church
- Emilio Jacinto, Filipino revolutionary
- Emilio José Viqueira, Spanish association football player
- Emilio Kauderer, Argentine musician and composer
- Emilio Kosterlitzky, Russian polyglot, soldier of fortune, and spy for the United States
- Emilio Lara (weightlifter), Cuban weightlifter
- Emilio Largo, fictional character and main antagonist from the James Bond novel Thunderball
- Emilio Larrosa, Mexican TV producer
- Emilio Lissón, Archbishop of Lima
- Emilio Lowe, fictional character in Black Cat
- Emilio Lunghi, Italian Olympic athlete
- Emilio Lussu, Sardinian soldier, politician and writer
- Emilio Martínez Lázaro, Spanish film director
- Emilio Martínez (footballer, born 1981), Paraguayan association football player
- Emilio Eduardo Massera, Argentine military officer
- Emilio Materassi, Italian Grand Prix motor racing driver
- Emilio Menéndez, Spanish politician
- Emilio Mwai Kibaki, 3rd President of the Republic of Kenya
- Emilio Mola, Nationalist commander during the Spanish Civil War

==== N–Z ====
- Emilio Navaira, Mexican-American singer (born Emilio H. Navaira III)
- Emilio Navarro, Puerto Rican baseball player
- Emilio Nsue, Spanish association football player
- Emilio Núñez Portuondo, American who became a Cuban politician, lawyer, diplomat, and Prime Minister of Cuba
- Emilio Ochoa, Cuban politician and former Senator
- Emilio Oribe, Uruguayan poet, essayist, philosopher, and doctor
- Emilio Mario Osmeña, Philippine politician and activist
- Emilio Palacios, Nicaraguan association football player
- Emilio Palma, first person known to be born on the continent of Antarctica
- Emilio Palucci Calsani, Brazilian association football player
- Emilio Pérez Touriño, Galician politician and economist
- Emilio Pettoruti, Argentine painter
- Emilio Portes Gil, Mexican politician and president of Mexico
- Emilio Prados, Spanish poet
- Emilio Pucci, Italian fashion designer and politician
- Emilio Pujol, Spanish composer
- Emilio Rodríguez (disambiguation), several people
- Emilio Ruiz del Río, Spanish film set decorator and special effects and visual effects artist
- Emilio De Rose, Italian dermatologist and politician
- Emilio Rubbi (1930–2005), Italian economist and politician
- Emilio Sagi Liñán, Argentine association football player
- Emilio Salaber (1937–2018), Spanish footballer
- Emilio Sala (painter), Spanish painter
- Emilio Sala (sculptor), Italian sculptor
- Emilio Salgari, Italian writer
- Emilio Sánchez Font, Cuban artist
- Emilio Sánchez-Perrier, Spanish painter
- Emilio Sánchez, Spanish tennis player
- Emílio Santiago, Brazilian singer
- Emilio G. Segrè, Italian physicist and Nobel laureate in physics
- Emilio Sereni (1907–1977), Italian writer, politician and historian
- Emilio Serrano y Ruiz, Spanish pianist and composer
- Emilio Soriano Aladren, Spanish association football referee
- Emilio T. Gonzalez, American director of United States Citizenship and Immigration Services
- Emilio Taruffi, Italian painter
- Emilio Ulloa, Chilean long-distance runner
- Emilio Valle, Cuban hurdler
- Emilio Vedova, Italian painter
- Emilio Vieyra, Argentine film director, actor, screenwriter and film producer
- Emilio Vilà, French artist
- Emilio Villalba Welsh, Argentine screenwriter
- Emilio Villoresi, Italian Grand Prix motor racing driver
- Emilio de Villota, Spanish racing driver
- Emilio Zapico, Spanish racing driver
- Emilio Zavattini, Italian physicist
- Emilio Zebadúa, Mexican politician
- Emilio Zocchi, Italian sculptor
- Emilio, marquis Visconti-Venosta, Italian statesman

=== Emílio ===
- Emílio Henrique Baumgart, Brazilian engineer
- Emílio Costa, Angolan singer known as Don Kikas
- Emílio Garrastazu Médici, Brazilian President
- Emílio Augusto Goeldi, Swiss-Brazilian naturalist and zoologist, also known as Émil Goeldi
- Emílio Lino, Portuguese fencer
- Emílio Peixe, Brazilian footballer
- Emílio da Silva, East Timorese footballer

=== Fictional characters ===
- Don Emilio Syquia, a character from FPJ's Ang Probinsyano

== See also ==
- Emilio Alvarez (disambiguation)
- Emilio Azcárraga (disambiguation)
- Emilio González (disambiguation)
- Emilios (disambiguation)
- Emílio (disambiguation)
- Emil (disambiguation)
