= List of Nicaraguan women writers =

This is a list of women writers who were born in Nicaragua or whose writings are closely associated with that country.

== A ==
- Claribel Alegría, pen name of Clara Isabel Alegría Vides (1924–2018), poet, essayist, novelist, journalist

== B ==
- Gioconda Belli (born 1948), novelist, poet
- Yolanda Blanco (born 1954), poet

== C ==
- Blanca Castellón (born 1958), poet

== G ==
- Karly Gaitán Morales (born 1980), journalist, non-fiction writer

== J ==
- Florence Jaugey (born 1959), French-born screenwriter, film director

== M ==
- Christianne Meneses Jacobs (born 1971), educator, children's magazine publisher
- Sofía Montenegro (born 1954), journalist, researcher, feminist
- Rosario Murillo (born 1951), poet, first lady of Nicaragua

== S ==
- Mariana Sansón Argüello (1918–2002), poet
- María Teresa Sánchez (1918–1994), poet, publisher

== T ==
- Josefa Toledo de Aguerri (1866–1962), feminist writer, journal publisher

== Z ==
- Daisy Zamora (born 1950), acclaimed poet

== See also ==
- List of women writers
- List of Spanish-language authors
