= Nicaraguan literature =

Literary traditions of Nicaragua

Life in Nicaragua

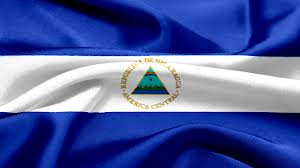

Cuisine
Culture
Demographics
Education
Holidays
Human Rights
Literature
Music
Politics
Religion
Tourism

Nicaraguan literature can be traced to pre-Columbian times with the myths and oral literature that formed the cosmogonic view of the world that indigenous people had. They told him that of these stories are still known in Nicaragua. Like many Latin American countries, the Spanish conquerors have had the most effect on both the culture and the literature. The literature of Nicaragua has had many important literary figures in the Spanish language with internationally prominent writers such as Rubén Darío, who is regarded as the most important literary figure in Nicaragua. He is referred to as the "Father of Modernism" for leading the modernismo literary movement at the end of the 19th century. Other important literary figures include Salomón de la Selva, Carlos Martínez Rivas, Pablo Antonio Cuadra, Alberto Cuadra Mejia, Manolo Cuadra Vega, Pablo Alberto Cuadra Arguello, Ernesto Cardenal, Sergio Ramírez Mercado, Gioconda Belli, José Coronel Urtecho, Alfonso Cortés, Julio Valle Castillo, and Claribel Alegría, among others.

== History ==
El Güegüense is a satirical drama and was the first literary work of post-Columbian Nicaragua. It is regarded as one of Latin America's most distinctive colonial-era expressions and as Nicaragua's signature folkloric masterpiece combining music, dance and theater. The theatrical play was written by an anonymous author in the 16th century, making it one of the oldest indigenous theatrical/dance works of the Western Hemisphere. It was passed down orally for many centuries until it was finally written down and published into a book in 1942.

== Literary movements ==
=== Modernismo ===
The Modernismo literary movement was a Spanish-American literary movement, best exemplified by Nicaraguan Rubén Darío, who is respectfully referred to as the "Father of Modernism". In the late 19th century, Modernismo emerged, a poetic movement whose recapitulation was a blending of three European currents: Romanticism, Symbolism and especially Parnassianism. Inner passions, visions, harmonies and rhythms are expressed in a rich, highly stylized verbal music. This movement was of great influence in the whole Spanish-speaking world (including the Philippines), finding a temporary vogue also among the Generación del 98 in Spain, which posited various reactions to its perceived aestheticism.

Modernismo was the first Latin American literary movement to influence literary culture outside of the region, and was also the first truly Latin American literature, in that national differences were no longer so much at issue. Though Modernismo itself is often seen as aestheticist and anti-political, some poets and essayists, introduced compelling critiques of the contemporary social order and particularly the plight of Latin America's indigenous peoples.

=== Poetry after Modernismo ===
Twentieth-century poetry in Nicaragua has often expressed political commitment, particularly given the model provided by Chilean Nobel laureate Pablo Neruda, and followed by such poets as Nicaragua's Ernesto Cardenal.

=== The Vanguardia ===
The Vanguardia was a literary movement that started in Granada, Nicaragua between 1927 and 1929, the movement was led by the Nicaraguan poet José Coronel Urtecho. According to literary manifests which were published in 1931, one of Coronel's objectives were to "initiate a struggle to get the public attention through artistic expressions, intellectual scandal, and aggressive criticism". The Vanguardia literary movement reflected several European movements, especially Surrealism. Vanguardia instituted a radical search for new, daring, confrontational themes and shockingly novel forms.

== See also ==
- List of Nicaraguan writers
- Latin American literature
- Culture of Nicaragua
- List of books and films about Nicaragua
