= Streetfare Journal =

American public art programme

The Streetfare Journal produced in New York and San Francisco by Transportation Displays Incorporated from 1984 to 1997, was, in truth, not a newsprint journal but "published" bus placards. It eventually numbered 102 posters and was arguably the largest and most successful public art program in U.S. history, delivering striking combinations of literature and visual art to an estimated 15 million riders daily in 16 major cities, including New York, Los Angeles, Chicago, Washington D.C., Philadelphia, San Francisco, Phoenix, New Orleans, Fort Worth and Fort Lauderdale. From a layout composed of typeset words on a white background, later issues paired stanzas of verse with paintings or photographs by noted visual artists, such as American painters Kenneth Noland and Clyfford Still and the English David Hockney, as well as photographers Mary Ellen Mark and Dorothea Lange. Texts in the series featured established American poets like Charles Bukowski, Langston Hughes, Thomas McGrath, Carl Sandburg, and William Carlos Williams, as well as newcomers like Ho Xuan Huong, John Kinsella, Joaquín Pasos and Daisy Zamora.

A possibly unique complete set was offered for sale by F.A. Bernet.

The program inspired the similar "Poetry in Motion" arts program inaugurated in 1997.
