= Emilio Alvarez =

Emilio Alvarez is the name of:

- Emilio Álvarez Icaza (born 1965), president of the Human Rights Commission of the Mexican Federal District
- Emilio Álvarez Lejarza (1884–1969), Nicaraguan jurist and political writer
- Emilio Álvarez Montalván (1919–2014), Nicaraguan doctor and political writer
- Emilio Benfele Álvarez (born 1972), Spanish tennis player
- Emilio Álvarez (Uruguayan footballer) (1939–2010), Uruguayan soccer player
- Emilio Aragón Álvarez (born 1959), Spanish director, musician, actor, presenter and producer
- Emilio Álvarez (Spanish footballer) (born 1971), Spanish football coach, former goalkeeper
- Emilio Alvarez (bishop), bishop of the Union of Charismatic Orthodox Churches

== See also ==
- Emilio (given name)
