= Scouting and Guiding in Nicaragua =

Scouting and Guiding movement in Nicaragua

The Scout and Guide movement in Nicaragua is served by

- Federación Nacional de Muchachas Guías de Nicaragua, member of the World Association of Girl Guides and Girl Scouts
- Asociación de Scouts de Nicaragua, member of the World Organization of the Scout Movement
