= María Teresa Sánchez =

María Teresa Sánchez (15 October 1918 – 21 August 1994) was a Nicaraguan poet, short story writer and publisher who did much to promote Nicaraguan culture in Central America.

== Biography ==
Born in Managua on 15 October 1918, Sánchez was self-taught as a writer. According to the acclaimed poet Ernesto Cardenal, she was "the first women of letters of Nicaragua and was of great importance as a promoter of Nicaraguan culture". In 1940, she founded the literary association Círculo de Letras and opened the publishing house Nuevos Horizontes which played an important part in collecting and reviving Nicaragua's most significant literary works. Cardenal also tells us that "For a long, fruitful period for Nicaraguan literature (the 1940s and 1950s), her home was a meeting place for writers and artists, and a venue for conferences and exhibitions".

Commenting on her second collection of poetry (Oasis, 1943), the Guatemalan critic Ramiro Córdoba writes: "Inside her pages, we breathe in the scent of the wooded countryside but do not see the swarm of cantharides above, driving our natives into a spate of frenzied dancing." For many years, she travelled through the countries of Central America promoting Nicaraguan culture. One of her conferences was devoted to the work of the Nicaraguan writer Joaquín Pasos (1914–1947), at another she presented the anti-fascist Spanish poet León Felipe (1884–1968).

Sánchez was involved in the demands for female suffrage in her country in the 1950s although she was accused by Joaquina Vega of not being as committed as some. One of the arguments was just about whether General Emilio Chamorro was to read their demands or another person. The argument also involved the conservative Margarita Cole Zavala but the presentation to congress was in the end unimportant as it took several more years to obtain their demands.

Her direct verse evokes themes common to her compatriots pain, sadness, desolation, loneliness, premonition of death, and anguish themes that often converge around the notion of farewell.

== Awards ==
In 1945, Sánchez was awarded the Rubén Darío Prize for her poetry. In the 1980s, she received the Rubén Darío Order of Cultural Independence.

== Works ==
- Sombras, Managua, 1939
- Oasis, Managua, 1943
- Canción de los caminos, Managua, 1949
- El hombre feliz y otros cuentos, Managua, 1957
- Canto amargo, Managua, 1958
- Poemas de la tarde, Managua, 1963
- Poemas agradeciendo a Dios, Managua, 1964
- El poeta pregunta por Stella, Managua, 1967
