= Crème Simon =

Crème Simon is a French heritage skincare brand founded by Joseph Simon in 1860. One of the largest French skincare brands in the early 20th century before the war, Crème Simon was a household name at its height of popularity throughout Europe and US.

== History ==
A pharmacist by trade, Joseph Simon built his first apothecary by the Rhône River in 1860. He would subsequently often come into contact with the French wives and washer women who would gather at the riverbanks of the Rhône River to do their laundry chores. Many of these women suffered from psoriasis (a painful skin condition whereby the skin is often red, dry and chapped), and eczema (sensitised and irritated skin) on their hands. Having ascertained that their condition is often triggered by constant exposure to the harsh environmental elements such as cold river water, sun, wind and temperature changes and common skin irritants such as soap, Joseph Simon sought for a natural remedy that could relieve their condition. The end product, known as the first cream to contain glycerine, a moisturising agent naturally derived from natural plant extracts, became an overwhelming success. A multi-purpose cream, it was also said to relieve mild abrasions and wounds, insect bites, rashes, and other skin irritations for face, hands and body.

== The Birth of Modern Cosmetology ==
Before the 20th century, skincare was often limited to unguents, ointments, dermatological salves and cold creams. The latter is especially popular, and is often made from beeswax or lipids from the sperm whale (spermaceti). Such unstable concoctions would turn rancid very quickly, and could only be prepared by the pharmacists in small quantities as they would not keep. Cold creams made during that era were also unhygienic and very greasy. Having had some success with his multipurpose cream, Joseph Simon formulated a hygienic and more stable formulation from natural plants and flower extracts known as Crème Simon. This marked the creation of a new skin preparation, simply termed as "Crème" which would later signal the birth of modern cosmetology of the 20th century.

== Distribution ==
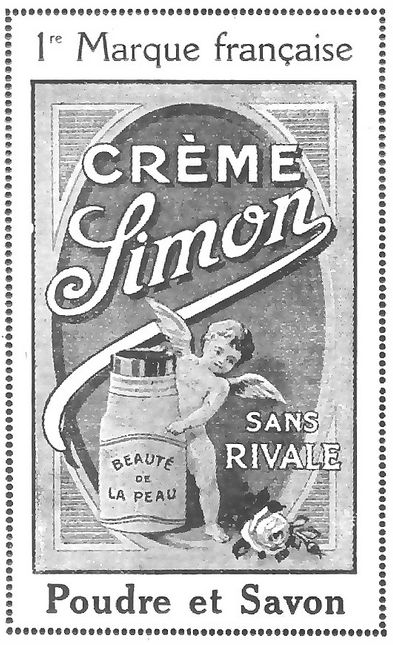
Crème Simon Print Ad 1918

Crème Simon was sold in pharmacies, perfumeries, hair salons around the world in the early 20th century. Distribution reached far and wide from France to US, London to Istanbul, and Russia and China. By the turn of the century, Crème Simon had set up base in 59, St Martin, Faubourg, Paris, in addition to its original Lyon address in 66 Rue de L'Universite, Lyon. It began marketing itself as No.1 unrivalled French brand and became one of the most sought after brands from France, which was already by then, renowned worldwide known for its superiority in skincare and toiletries preparation.

== Art Heritage ==
Creme Simon was known to patronize rising artistic stars by commissioning them for marketing campaigns. From the 1920s, they started commissioning artists such as Emilio Vilà and Chéri Herouard, and later followed by several other leading art deco illustrators such as Léon Benigni, Charles Martin, and Jean-Gabriel Domergue, each with their own trademark style. The 1930s took another artistic turn, as they tapped the artistic talents of William Pera, Réne Vincent, Henri Sjoberg and Jean Adrien Mercier to illustrate their interpretations of Creme Simon ads. The 1940s saw more colorful printouts with artists like Bret Koch Ray, Libis, Montebello before the modern semi-surrealist works of Philippe Noyer in the 1950s.

The use of renowned photographers were especially prominent in their 1950s campaign. Most of their ads during this time featured the photographic works of Lucien Lorelle, who pioneered the first color photo lab and photography as an artform, and Sam Levin, who is often credited for the portrayal of Brigitte Bardot as an iconic cultural French figure with his early photos of her.

Commercial (film) advertisements were also made during that era. Some of which have been produced by Alexandre Alexeieff, who with his wife, invented the pinscreen and the animation technique of totalization. Crème Simon was one of his first commercial clients, for whom 3 animations (1935: The Two Armies; 1936: Game of Cards; The Birth of Venus) were created.

== Celebrity Endorsements ==
Some of the earliest published celebrity endorsements for Crème Simon came from Adelina Patti (1902), a highly acclaimed opera singer described by many great opera composers as the finest singer of her era, who said in a newspaper published in 1902, "I have found Creme Simon very good indeed for restoring and reviving the complexion. It's as if roughness disappeared". Other celebrities known to have endorsed Creme Simon are Pauline Po (1922), who was Miss France 1920 and a popular French comedian; and Genevieve Felix (1923), a renowned French actress of the silent cinema who was once crowned the "Muse of Montmartre" in a beauty pageant associated with French nationalism, amongst others.

By the 1950s, Creme Simon took a heavier stance by leveraging on the drawing power of movie stars, from Dominique Wilms, a femme fatale in several French thriller and action movies in the 1950s to 60s; Christine Carère, Irène Tunc, and many other celebrities. Brigitte Bardot was also known to have credited Crème Simon in one of her autobiographical books.

== Movie Credits ==
Creme Simon appeared in the award-winning French period musical drama, Paris36, directed by Christophe Barratier of The Chorus. Set in the 1920s, one of the main character, a young chanteuse, Douce (played by Nora Arnezeder), sang and alluded to Crème Simon's beauty properties during her auditioning scene in the movie.
