= Jesus Rojas (disambiguation) =

Jesus Rojas (1950–1991) was a Nicaraguan major leader of the FMLN.

Jesus Rojas may also refer to:

- Jesús Rojas (Puerto Rican boxer) (born 1986)
- Jesús Rojas (Venezuelan boxer) (born 1964)
