= Göttel =

Göttel or Gottel is a German language surname from the personal name Gottfried. Notable people with the name include:

- Enrique Gottel (1831–1875), German-Nicaraguan journalist, music composer and historian
- Moritz Göttel (1993), German footballer
