= Mercedes Carvajal de Arocha =

Venezuelan politician

- Born: 8 November 1902; Port of Spain, Trinidad
- Died: 31 August 1994 (aged 91); Caracas, Venezuela
- Writing career
- Pen name: Lucila Palacios

Mercedes Carvajal de Arocha known as Lucila Palacios (8 November 1902 – 31 August 1994) was a Trinidadian born Venezuelan writer, politician and diplomat. She was the first woman elected to the Venezuelan Senate and the first female member of the Venezuelan Academy of Language.

== Life ==
Carvajal was born on the island of Trinidad in 1902 in Port of Spain. She took the pen name Lucila Palacios. She chose the name of Lucila in honour of the Chilean poet Gabriela Mistral whose real first name was Lucila. Her new surname was taken from Concepción Palacios who was Simon Bolivar's mother.

In 1931 she began writing and in 1936, she founded the Women’s Patriotic Junta in Caracas to further women’s political rights and in particular the right to vote. In 1947 she was a representative in the National Constituent Assembly. From 1948 to 1952 she was a senator. During this time she was raped. She was known for defending the rights of women and children.

She wrote short stories, poems and novels in Spanish. She won a number of prestigious awards and she was the first woman member of the Academia Venezolana de la Lengua who are interested in Venezuelan Spanish.

In 1963 she became her country's ambassador to Uruguay. Carvajal died in Caracas in 1994.

== Personal life ==
She married Carlos Arocha and they had four children.

== Legacy ==
Her novels have been studied and published as The Political Novels of Lucila Palacios and Marta Lynch.
