= Federación Nacional de Muchachas Guías de Nicaragua =

- Location: Managua
- Country: Nicaragua
- Founded: 1940
- Membership: 86
- Affiliation: World Association of Girl Guides and Girl Scouts

The Federación Nacional de Muchachas Guías de Nicaragua (National Federation of Girl Guides of Nicaragua) is the national Guiding organization of Nicaragua. It serves 86 members (as of 2003). Founded in 1940, the girls-only organization became an associate member of the World Association of Girl Guides and Girl Scouts in 1981.

The Guide Motto is Siempre Activas, Always Active; and the Guide Slogan is Lealtad Sacrificio Pureza, Loyalty Sacrifice Purity.

== See also ==
- Asociación de Scouts de Nicaragua
