= Emilio Rodríguez =

Emilio Rodríguez may refer to:

- Emilio Rodríguez (actor) (1918–1988), Spanish policeman and actor
- Emilio Rodríguez (cyclist) (1923–1984), Spanish professional road bicycle racer
- Emilio Rodríguez (footballer) (born 2003), Mexican footballer
- Emilio Rodríguez Mendoza (1873–1960), Chilean journalist, diplomat and politician
- Emilio Hector Rodriguez (born 1950), Cuban artist
