= Emilio Aguirre =

Mexican-born US Army soldier (1914–1995)

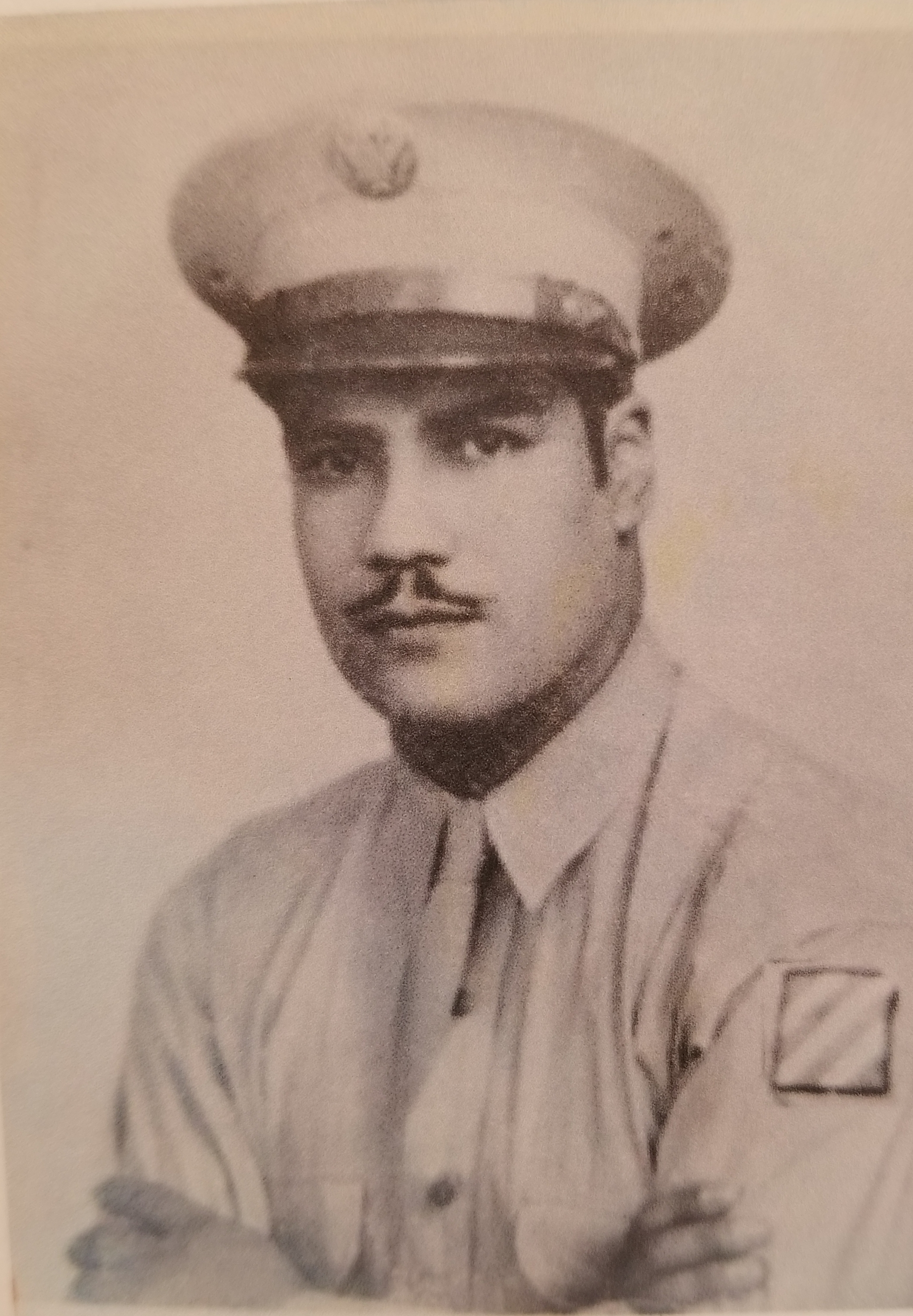
- Emilio Aguirre 3rd Infantry Division WWII Photo
- Born: August 5, 1914; Cuajimalpa de Morelos, Federal District, Mexico
- Died: July 17, 1995 (aged 80); Chicago
- Cause of death: Heat Stroke, Hyperthermia
- Burial place: Homewood Memorial Gardens, Cook County, Illinois; Section GGSAM/CH, Row 1, Grave 63
- Spouse(s): Julia Hernandez (married 1933; died 1930s)
- Children: 1
- Military career
- Allegiance: United States Army
- Branch: Army
- Service years: 1943-1945
- Rank: Private
- Units: 3rd Infantry Division, 7th regiment, Company G
- Conflicts: Naples-Foggia and Rome-Arno
- Awards: European-African-Middle Eastern Campaign Medal two Bronze Battle Stars, the POW Medal, World War II Victory Medal, the Army Good Conduct Medal, European-African-Middle Eastern Theater Ribbon, three Overseas Service Bars and Combat Infantryman Badge
- Other work: Chicago North Western Railway, Illinois Central Railroad Company

Emilio Aguirre (August 5, 1914 – July 17, 1995) was a Mexican-born World War II prisoner of war U.S. Army veteran who died during the deadliest heat wave in Chicago's history, that killed 739 Chicagoans with temperatures reaching a heat index of 125 degrees in July 1995. His story, largely forgotten for decades, garnered attention when his remains were reburied with full military honors on July 17, 2025, exactly 30 years after his death.

== Biography ==
Born in Cuajimalpa de Morelos in the Mexican Federal District, Aguirre came to the United States as an undocumented teenager at 13 years old.

Aguirre enlisted in the U.S. Army in 1943, even before becoming a naturalized citizen. He served in the 7th Infantry Regiment, 3rd Infantry Division, one of the first divisions to enter the European Theater. He fought in the Naples-Foggia and Rome-Arno campaigns in Italy. Aguirre was captured in Italy in 1944 and spent over 400 days as a prisoner of war in Germany's Stalag II-B camp. He was liberated by Soviet fighters in January. For his service, Aguirre was awarded the Bronze Star Medal, Prisoner of War Medal, Combat Infantryman Badge, and other campaign and service medals.

After the war, Aguirre became a naturalized U.S. citizen and worked for the Chicago and North Western Railway and Illinois Central Rail Road company in Chicago.

The lack of air conditioning, a consequence of destitution, Aguirre died alone in his apartment during the deadly 1995 Chicago heat wave 50 years after being liberated as POW during WWII, being just two weeks shy before his 82nd birthday.

Unclaimed decedent due to the lack of family to claim his body, Aguirre was initially buried in an unmarked mass grave at Homewood Memorial Gardens in Cook County, Illinois, with other victims of the heat wave.

Rediscovery and reburial years later, Aguirre's story came to light in the 2019 documentary Cooked: Survival by Zip Code, a film by director Judith Hefland, based on Eric Klinenberg's book Heat Wave. Local historian veteran activist Charles Henderson discovered Aguirre's story and with the help of Chicago veteran organizations collaborated with the Mayor's Office of Veterans Affairs in advocating for him to receive proper recognition 30 years later. His story, largely forgotten for decades, garnered attention when his remains were reburied with full military honors on July 17, 2025, exactly 30 years after his death.
