= Julio Valle Castillo =

Nicaraguan poet, painter, and literature/art critic

Julio Valle Castillo (JVC)
- Born: August 10, 1952; Masaya, Nicaragua
- Education: National Autonomous University of Mexico
- Occupations: poet, painter, essayist, literary critic, piedrero and art critic
- Known for: Poetry, painting, literary criticism, art criticism
- Notable work: Las armas iniciales, Ronda tribal para el nacimiento de Sandino, El inventario del paraíso
- Movement: Modernismo; Nicaraguan poetry of the 1970s

Julio Valle Castillo (born August 10, 1952), was born in Masaya, Nicaragua. He is a poet, painter, and a literary critic, and art critic.

== Early life and career ==
Valle-Castillo studied Hispanic Language and Literature at the National Autonomous University in Mexico. Valle-Castillo began publishing his poems in Pablo Antonio Cuadra's newspaper supplement, "La Prensa Literaria", in the 1970s. Valle-Castillo later published his first book in 1977, "Las Armas Iniciales". Valle-Castillo, along with Mayra Jiménez, served as editor of "Poesía Libre", a monthly publication published during the Sandinista government.

As of 2006, Julio Valle-Castillo served as the director of the Instituto Nicaragüense de Cultura (INC) (Nicaraguan Institute of Culture).

== Literary works ==
Published

- Las armas iniciales (1977)
- Las primeras notas del laúd (1977)
- Formas migratorias (1979)
- Materia jubilosa (1986)
- Ronda tribal para el nacimiento de Sandino (1981)
- Con los pasos cantados (1998)

Poetry

- Poetas modernistas de Nicaragua (1978)
- Rimbaud entre nosotros (1993)
- Poesía francesa / Traducciones nicaragüenses (1993);
- Hija del día / Artes poéticas nicaragüenses (1994);
- Nicaragua: cuentos escogidos (1998)
- Cuentos nicaragüenses (2002)

Essays

- El inventario del paraíso (1986)
- La catedral de León de Nicaragua (2000)
- Las humanidades de la poesía nicaragüense (2001)

Novel

- Réquiem en Castilla del Oro (1966)

== See also ==
- Literature of Nicaragua
- Culture of Nicaragua
