= Emilio Azcárraga =

Emilio Azcárraga is the name of three members of the Azcárraga family, a Mexican business family of Basque descent. The following individuals are:

- Emilio Azcárraga Vidaurreta (1895–1972), original patriarch
- Emilio Azcárraga Milmo (1930–1997), son of Vidaurreta
- Emilio Azcárraga Jean (born 1968), son of Milmo
