= Yolanda Blanco =

Nicaraguan poet (born 1954)

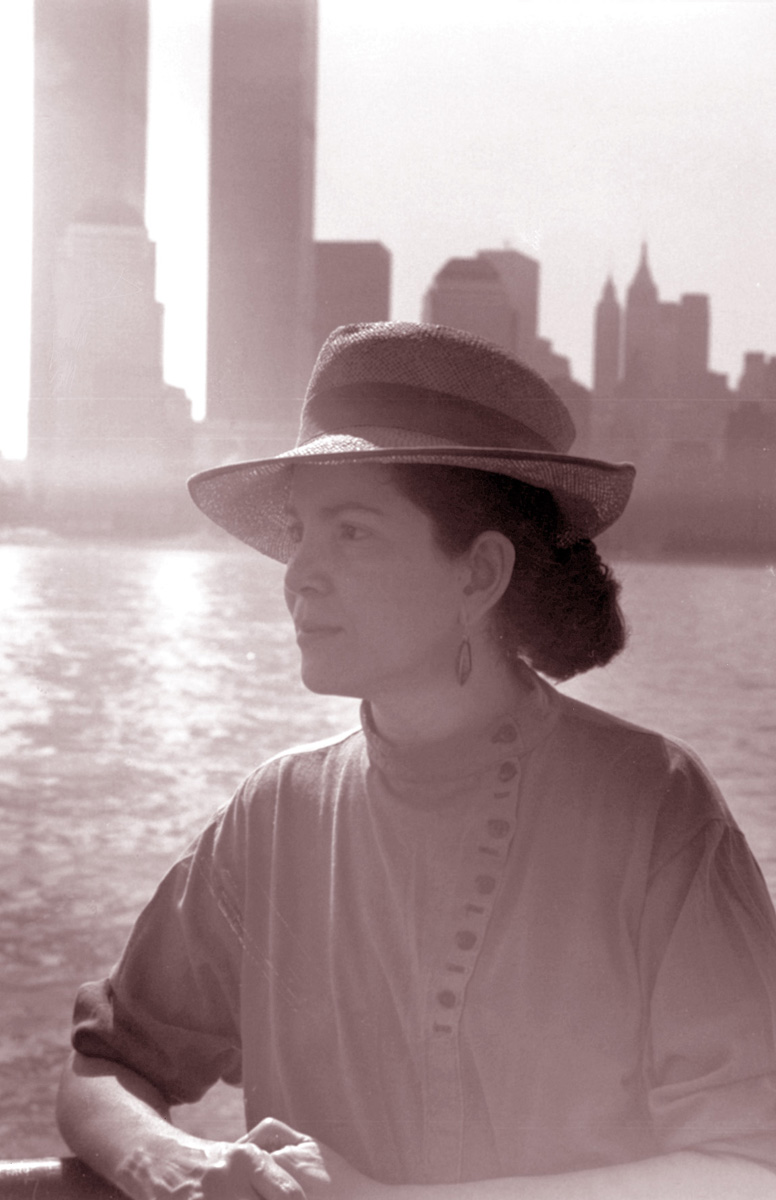
- Yolanda Blanco in New York City
- Born: November 1954 (age 71); Managua, Nicaragua
- Occupation: Poet
- Website: www.yolandablanco.net

Yolanda Blanco (born in 1954) is a Nicaraguan poet.

== Life ==
Yolanda Blanco was born in Managua, Nicaragua. She attended the Universidad Nacional Autónoma de Nicaragua, in León, between 1970 and 1971. While studying at the university, she organized the first poetry lectures ever, featuring the top Nicaraguan women poets. Blanco went on to study art history and literature in France. During the Seventies, she worked for the creation of a new society in Nicaragua. However, in 1978, she was forced to move to Venezuela when her family's home was unjustifiably invaded by Sandinista officials. Although she was a well known young Nicaraguan poet during the Eighties, Blanco was not paraded by the Sandinista regime because she did not belong to its party. Blanco graduated with a degree in Literature from the Universidad Central de Venezuela. She was a member of "Calicanto", a literary workshop conducted by Venezuelan writer Antonia Palacios, and participated actively in the Venezuelan literary world. In 2005, Blanco won the Mariana Sansón Argüello National Poetry Award—a literary contest organized yearly by the Nicaraguan Association of Women Writers (ANIDE)—for her book De lo urbano y lo sagrado.

Blanco currently lives in New York City where she works as a translator and practices Taoist arts.

== Published work ==
- Así cuando la lluvia. Leon, Nicaragua: Editorial Hospicio, 1974
- Cerámica sol. León, Nicaragua: Editorial UNAN, 1977
- Penqueo en Nicaragua. Managua, Nicaragua: Editorial Unión, 1981
- Aposentos. Caracas, Venezuela: Pen Club de Venezuela, 1985
- De lo urbano y lo sagrado. Managua, Nicaragua: Ediciones ANIDE, 2005

== Themes ==
Yolanda Blanco's poetic writing reveals a route of intimate spaces that intensify the experience of the female apprehension of reality, of Nature, and of language through the articulation of a discourse coinciding with the feminist postulates of the difference. Her poems also represent a testimony of the revolutionary fight that culminated with the triumph of the Sandinista National Liberation Front (FSLN) in Nicaragua.

The focus of her first collection, Así cuando la lluvia, falls on the months of May and June, considered the months of the rain and of the tree. The poet affirms the creative power of the rain identified with that of the woman and welcomes it with affection and happiness. The water brightens up the colors and dissipates monotony. It also creates a bucolic vision in which time is only present and the woman is actualized in love and in memories establishing the foundation of her existence. The woman asserts her pride of being and her common nature with the tree through the sensuality of the touch and the erotism of the body.

In Cerámica sol, Blanco tries to rescue the power of the primeval word, the language rooted in the symbol and in rites. The poet becomes the sun's priestess to extol its meaning in the human life, in the humbleness of the harvests and fruits, in the activity of the bees, in love, in the chant ... The perfect conciliation of all these elements is attained in the fertile embrace of Nature.

Penqueo en Nicaragua was written during the revolutionary fight of the Nicaraguan people that put an end to the regime of Anastasio Somoza. It constitutes the testimony of a call for action against injustice and a chant for the hope of liberation. With an enormous emotive force, the poet depicts the heroism and courage of the indigenous neighborhood of Monimbó that led the vanguard in the war against the Sower of the Flowers of Evil. The transformation of peace, work, music, and dance into shrapnel, bombs, destruction, and death originated the uprising against the Somocista army. Blanco remembers the dead Sandinista guerrilla fighters and the faith in the cause for Nicaragua. Pain, hope, guns, and guitars alternate in the poet's affirmation of having been "impregnated" by the love for the Revolution. The colors of Sandinismo, black and red, appear in most of the poems to verbalize the conflict generated by oppression and liberty. The denouncement of atrocities, the imprisonments for insurgency, the voices of witnesses, the poverty, orphanhood, mutilation, hunger, and affliction create a multiple cry for solidarity in the fight guided by the motto "Free Country or Death."

In Aposentos, Blanco's awareness of being a woman is the dominant theme. Using a subversive language that praises sensuality and sexuality, the poet glorifies each part of the female body. Her objective is to inaugurate a new sociological and cultural space confronting the prevalent stereotypes that limit female expression. The identification of woman and Nature emerges continuously in Blanco's poems to communicate their essential creative commonality. It becomes a double discursive axis of denouncement: the subordinated role of women in society, and the generalized repression of their emotions, their experience of love, and writing. Blanco's poetry deviates from the patriarchal tradition and vindicates the validity of a female discourse, the synthesis of a personal and historical process.

De lo urbano y lo sagrado is a mixture of themes. On the one hand, there is nature again; there is the everyday, which the poet considers sacred; and there is also the city, the ultimate city, New York. Blanco transforms herself into a series of Nicaraguan poets: Rubén Darío, Salomón de la Selva, José Coronel Urtecho, and Ernesto Cardenal to portray the 20th century, together with her own time, her country, and her tradition.
