= Simrry Villareyna =

Nicaraguan footballer

Personal information
- Full name: Simrry Darissa Villarreyna Zelaya
- Date of birth: 17 November 1994 (age 31)
- Place of birth: Ocotal, Nicaragua
- Position: Forward

Team information
- Current team: Real Estelí
- Number: 9

Senior career*
Years	Team	Apps	(Gls)
- Ocotal
- Real Estelí

International career^{‡}
2021–	Nicaragua	2	(0)
- * Club domestic league appearances and goals ‡ National team caps and goals as of 7 July 2021.

Simrry Darissa Villarreyna Zelaya (born 17 November 1994) is a Nicaraguan footballer who plays as a forward for Real Estelí FC and the Nicaragua women's national team.

== Early life ==
Villareyna was born in Ocotal and raised in Quilalí.

== Club career ==
Villareyna has played for FC Ocotal and Real Estelí in Nicaragua.

== International career ==
Villareyna made her senior debut for Nicaragua on 4 July 2021 in a 0–2 friendly away loss to Panama.
