= Carlos Reynaldo Lacayo =

Carlos Reynaldo Lacayo Lacayo (born 1950 in Diriamba, Nicaragua). Studied business administration at Harvard University. Member of the National Committee, INCAE. President or Director of various Nicaraguan and Central American companies including Grupo CALSA, OCAL, S.A. and other transnational corporations. Former president and founding member of the Advertisers' Association of Nicaragua, director of the Central American Federated Chambers of Advertisers, as well as that of FUNDE and INDE.
