= Emilio Cavenecia =

Emilio Cavenecia was a nineteenth-century Peruvian military hero killed in battle during the War of the Pacific. Emilio Cavenecia Avenue, in the financial district of San Isidro, Peru, is named in his honor.

== Bibliography ==
"Los hijos de los libertadores" (The Sons of the Liberators) By Guillermo Thorndike, Published by Fondo Editorial del Congreso del Perú, Fondo Editorial del Banco de Crédito del Perú, 2005, ISBN 9972-221-01-6, ISBN 978-9972-221-01-9 1317 pages, Page 133.
