= Emilio Gómez =

Emilio Gómez may refer to:

- Emilio Gómez Muriel (1910-1985), Mexican film director
- Emilio Gómez (footballer) (born 1958), Spanish footballer
- Emilio Gómez (tennis) (born 1991), Ecuadorian tennis player

== See also ==
- Emilia Gómez Bravo (born 1954), Mexican politician
