= Alejandro Lacayo =

Alejandro J. Lacayo Baca (August 9, 1951) was appointed by the President of the Republic of India as Honorary Consul General in Nicaragua on March 31, 2022, and accredited in Nicaragua on April 11 2022 by Presidential Decree 62-2022

Mr. Lacayo also was Honorary Consul of Portugal and Malaysia in Nicaragua, appointed by the Government of Malaysia and accredited in Nicaragua by Presidential decree No 20-2017. Mr. Lacayo ended his Honorary Consul career in May 2024. He was born in Nicaragua and attended Georgetown University from 1969-1973. His father Alejandro Lacayo Montealegre founded the Monte Rosa Sugar Mill in Nicaragua. Mr. Lacayo is also involved in Sugar Cane growing farms, and also does Corporate Consultancy in the field of sales, distribution and logistics for International Corporations. Mr. Lacayo played golf for the Nicaraguan National Amateur Seniors Team during 2003 to 2013 competing annually in Central America.
