= Emilio González =

Emilio González is the name of:

- Emilio González González (fl. 1950s), Chilean politician
- Emilio González Márquez (born 1960), Mexican PAN (National Action Party) politician
- Emilio T. Gonzalez, head of USCIS (United States Citizenship and Immigration Services) and Miami politician
- Emilio Gonzales III, Philippine deputy ombudsman involved in the Manila hostage crisis

== See also ==
- Emilio Lee Gonzales, a child whose medico-legal case under the Texas Advance Directives Act is of note.
- Jorge Emilio González Martínez, Mexican PVEM (Green Ecologist Party of Mexico) politician
