= Alejandro Cuadra =

Chilean lawyer and politician

Alejandro Cuadra Lazo

Member of the Chamber of Deputies of Chile
- In office 1926–1930
- Constituency: First Departmental District (Pisagua and Tarapacá)

Personal details
- Born: 9 July 1861 La Serena, Chile
- Died: 19 March 1938 (aged 76) Santiago, Chile
- Party: Radical Party
- Occupation: Lawyer, politician

Alejandro Cuadra Lazo (9 July 1861 – 19 March 1938) was a Chilean lawyer and politician who served as a member of the Chamber of Deputies of Chile for the First Departmental District of Pisagua and Tarapacá during the 1926–1930 legislative period.

== Early life and education ==
Cuadra Lazo was born in La Serena, Chile. He completed his secondary education in his hometown and later moved to Santiago to study law at the University of Chile. After obtaining his law degree, he returned to professional practice and became involved in political life.

== Political career ==
A member of the Radical Party, Cuadra Lazo was elected deputy for the First Departmental District "Pisagua and Tarapacá" for the 1926–1930 term. During his time in the Chamber of Deputies of Chile, he served as substitute member of the Permanent Commission on Interior Government (Comisión Permanente de Gobierno Interior).

His parliamentary service took place during a period of significant institutional change in Chile, marked by the transition from the parliamentary regime to the constitutional framework established after 1925.

== Personal life ==
Cuadra Lazo maintained professional and political ties both in northern Chile and in the capital. He died on 19 March 1938 in Santiago.
