= Concepción Palacios Herrera =

First female physician in Nicaragua

Concepción Palacios
- Born: Concepción Palacios Herrera; 5 December 1893; El Sauce, León, Nicaragua
- Died: 1 May 1981 (aged 87)
- Education: UNAM School of Medicine
- Occupation: Physician
- Spouse: Lorenzo Zelaya

Concepción Palacios Herrera (5 December 1893 – 1 May 1981) was the first female physician in Nicaragua.

Her mother was a midwife and healer and her father was a medical naturalist. She was expelled from school for refusing compulsory communion, but the feminist Josefa Toledo de Aguerri supported her so that she was able to study in the Normal School for Young Ladies, from which she graduated in 1919.

She went to Mexico in 1919, and in 1927 she graduated as a physician and surgeon from the National School of Medicine of the National Autonomous University of Mexico (UNAM).

In 1928 she returned to Nicaragua, where she supported Augusto César Sandino's fight against the American occupation of Nicaragua. President Jose Maria Moncada had her imprisoned for political reasons, and she went to Mexico when she was freed. She also worked in the U.S. as a specialist, surgeon, and obstetrician. She volunteered as a member of the Allied Expeditionary Force in Europe from 1945 through 1946, serving survivors of the Nazi concentration camps and people displaced by war.
