= Joseph A. Harrison =

Moravian pastor

Reverend Joseph Alexander Harrison (April 30, 1883 – 1964) was a Moravian pastor. He was born in San Juan de Nicaragua (formerly known as Greytown) to Cornelius and Margaret Harrison.

== Personal life ==
When he was young, the family relocated to Bluefields, Nicaragua where he attended school. After several attempts at various trades, he eventually became a bookkeeper and worked for a local company in Bluefields. In the mid-1930s he joined the national guard and rose to the rank of captain. After leaving the military, he became a Moravian pastor. He was dedicated to his ministry until the time of his death.

He married three times (Margaret Casanova, Charlotte Hogdson, Aminta Lampson) and was widowed twice. He had a total of nine children: Leonie, Alexander, Margaret, Anita, Junietta, Maggie, James, Mary Anne, and Myrtle. In 1957, a stamp was commissioned in honour of him founding the Boy Scouts in Nicaragua. On June 27, 1964, he died in Bluefields, and was buried there.

== Scouting ==
In 1916, he was asked by Aubry Campbell Ingram to write a letter to the Boy Scouts of America, who helped him start the first Scout troop in Nicaragua, called Moravian Uno.

In 1942, the Nicaraguan Scout groups formed the Federación Nacional de Boy Scouts de Nicaragua, which was recognized by the government in the same year. The federation became a member of the World Organization of the Scout Movement in 1946. In the 1950s, the federation changed its name to Asociación de Scouts de Nicaragua.
