= Josefa Toledo de Aguerri =

Nicaraguan writer (1866–1962)

- Born: 21 April 1866; Juigalpa, Nicaragua
- Died: 27 April 1962 (aged 96); Managua, Nicaragua
- Education: Colegio de Señoritas
- Occupations: Educator, Writer
- Spouse: Juan Francisco Aguerri (m. 1900) until his death in the 1930s

Josefa Toledo de Aguerri or Josefa Emilia Toledo Murillo (21 April 1866 – 27 April 1962) was a Nicaraguan first-wave feminist, writer and reform pedagogue. Regarded as a pioneer for education of women in Nicaragua, she is along with Dame Angélica Balladares de Argüello one of the most celebrated feminists and suffragists in Nicaragua in the mid-1930s, both being honoured by the Unión de Mujeres Americanas as the 1950 and 1959 Woman of Nicaragua and of the Americas, respectively.

Earlier, she had provided much needed support to yet another noted political activist, Dame Concepción Palacios Herrera so that she was able to study at the Normal School for Young Ladies, from which Concepción graduated in 1919 prior to her moving to Mexico to attend the Autonomopus University of Mexico's Medical School, graduating there as the first female physician as Nicaragua's history. Josefa served as general director of education in 1924, the first woman of Nicaragua to be given such an office.

She graduated as one of the first from Colegio de Señoritas, the first secular college to admit women in Nicaragua, alongside among others, Carmela Noguera. She was a leader of the women's rights movement in Nicaragua and published several works about this issue, and also founded a few papers about this issue, the first one being Revista Femenina Ilustrada (1918). In 1920 she visited feminists in Cuba and the United States, including meeting with the suffragist Amelia Maiben de Ostolaza in Havana. In 1940 she published a series of essays called "Feminism and Education."
