= Asociación de Scouts de Nicaragua =

National Scouting organization of Nicaragua

- Emblem of the Scout Association of Nicaragua
- Country: Nicaragua
- Founded: 1942
- Defunct: 2024
- Membership: 1,509 (2011)
- Affiliation: World Organization of the Scout Movement
- Website https://scoutsdenicaragua.org/

The Asociación de Scouts de Nicaragua (ASN, roughly Scout Association of Nicaragua) was the national Scouting organization of Nicaragua. Scouting in Nicaragua started in 1917 and became a member of the World Organization of the Scout Movement (WOSM) in 1946. The coeducational association had 1,509 members (as of 2011). It was closed down in 2024.

== History ==
The first Nicaraguan Scout group developed in Bluefields, Nicaragua; its founders were Reverend Joseph A. Harrison and Aubry Campbell Ingram, a boy who had read an article on the Boy Scouts of America. On his inquiries, Reverend Harrison wrote to the BSA headquarters asking for more information. In addition to information, Reverend Harrison received the authorization to start a Boy Scout troop, the Moravian Uno, which was affiliated to the BSA.

In the following years the movement spread through the country; its groups formed a loosely connected network. The first group on the Pacific Coast was founded in 1929 in Granada, Nicaragua by Vital Miranda Whitford with the help of Father Almanza, a Catholic priest. The Roman Catholic Church, and especially the Jesuits, gave vital support to the growing Scout Movement.

In 1942, the Nicaraguan Scout groups formed the Federación Nacional de Boy Scouts de Nicaragua, which was recognized by the government in the same year. The federation became a member of the WOSM in 1946.

In the 1950s, the federation changed its name to Asociación de Scouts de Nicaragua.

Training leaders has been one of the Nicaraguan Scouts priorities. Scouts have been active for the good of their society more than in many other countries. They gather used books to sponsor and equip small schools. They worked in Managua to relieve suffering when the great earthquake of 1972 struck and Hurricane Fifi wrecked Honduras. Nicaraguan Scouts also assisted during Hurricane Mitch of 1998, which left thousands dead and many more homeless. They assisted in disaster relief. They were mobilized in the mountainous areas to help with the search for survivors and remove the tons of dirt by hand from the remote highways so that relief and supplies could be brought in. The Scouts were recognized by the government and other world relief organizations for their assistance in the disaster relief, even though many of the Scouts themselves were victims of the hurricane.

During the Sandinista period the ASN could not maintain normal Scout activities, due to the civil war in the country.

Nicaragua was host for the Camporee Scout Centroamericano on three occasions:

- 1952, I Camporee Scout Centroamericano in Punta Chiltepe
- 1965, VII Camporee Scout Centroamericano in El Coyotepe near Masaya
- 2004, XX Camporee Scout Centroamericano in El Coyotepe near Masaya

The organization was shut down by the Nicaraguan government under Daniel Ortega in February 2024, allegedly over missing financial reports. The governmental action was seen as part of "an ongoing crackdown that has seen the government toss out religious orders, charities and civic groups".

== Program and ideals ==
The association had four sections:

- Lobatos (Cub Scouts)
- Scouts
- Caminantes (Senior Scouts)
- Rovers

The Scout motto was Siempre listos, Always prepared.

The Scout emblem incorporated elements of the coat of arms of Nicaragua.

== See also ==
- Federación Nacional de Muchachas Guías de Nicaragua
