= Jesus Rojas =

Nicaraguan Jesuit (1950–1991)

Antonio Cardenal Caldera (15 June 1950 – 11 April 1991), also known by the nom de guerre Jesus Rojas (Red Jesus), was a Nicaraguan and a major leader of the FMLN (Farabundo Martí National Liberation Front) resistance movement in late-20th century El Salvador.

== Early life ==
Born in Nicaragua to a prominent family, Cardenal was one of the ten children of Julio Cardenal and Indiana Caldera. His father's cousins included Ernesto Cardenal and his brother Fernando, both priests who adhered to liberation theology. Cardenal decided to pursue a career in the Jesuit seminary. After being sent to El Salvador as a priest, Cardenal was profoundly impacted by the anti-Jesuit violence he witnessed perpetrated by the Salvadoran government. Due to these events, he went underground as a rebel leader of the FMLN movement, in which he led the FPL (Fuerzas Populares de Liberación) for several years. He was a major proponent of the peace talks with the government in the early 1990s, and worked towards a negotiated peace for both sides. On April 11, 1991, Cardenal was assassinated by a group of Army troops attempting to sabotage the peace process. However, the FMLN leadership decided to proceed with the talks at the expense of one of their commanders.
