= Emilio Vilà =

Spanish artist and poster illustrator (1887–1967)

Emilio Vilà (1887–1967) was a Spanish artist and poster illustrator born in a small village in Catalonia called Llagostera. He studied in Llagostera for some years, and later in Barcelona. Because of the Spanish Civil War, he had to move to France (artists were not well seen), where he worked as a painter and poster illustrator. He also painted portraits. In Paris, he knew painters such as Toulouse-Lautrec and Picasso.

When he was about 60, he returned to his hometown and bought a factory, which he converted to an art gallery. It is now the Emilio Vilà Museum. He died at age 80 in Llagostera. Although he did dark paintings for a time of his life, his style was mainly shiny and colored.
