= Erwin Krüger =

Erwin Krüger Urroz (November 2, 1915 in León, Nicaragua – July 28, 1973 in Managua) was a Nicaraguan folklore poet and singer.

He was born in León, Nicaragua to a German father and Nicaraguan mother.
