= Enrique Gottel =

- Born: 1831; Danzig, Kingdom of Prussia
- Died: January 11, 1875 (aged 43–44); Managua, Nicaragua
- Occupations: Journalist, music composer, historian

Enrique Gottel (1831–1875) was a German-Nicaraguan journalist, music composer, and historian.

== Arrival in Nicaragua ==
Gottel was born in Danzig, Kingdom of Prussia, and emigrated to the United States at a young age. He spoke English, Spanish, and German. When the gold rush struck in California, he arranged for a trip via Commodore Cornelius Vanderbilt's Accessory Transit Company which took a natural route through the San Juan river in Nicaragua. Gottel decided to stay in Rivas, a city located in Nicaragua's Southwestern Pacific region. He later established a contract with the Accessory Transit Company. Gottels contract with the Accessory Transit Company consisted of diligences hauled by horses to transport people between Bahía de la Virgen (Bay of the Virgin) in Lake Nicaragua and the port in San Juan del Sur. In 1856, it left him in ruins due to the struggle between William Walker and Vanderbilt. Gottel resumed his diligence service in 1861 with his new partner, Colombian General Pedro Ruiz Tejada. After Gottels death, Ruiz kept the service going and added a new route from León to Chinandega.

In 1872, Gottel traveled to Guatemala to recover archives corresponding to the history of Nicaragua. Due to the country's instability at the time, the valuable historical documents were sent to San Francisco, California, to be protected. To date, the archives remain in the Bancroft Library at the University of California, Berkeley.

== El Porvenir ==
Gottel founded a weekly newspaper in Rivas in 1865, "El Porvenir de Nicaragua" ("The Future of Nicaragua"), that was published every Saturday and was bilingual; Spanish and English. El Porvenir was the first newspaper that did not depend on protection from a political party or government favors. Gottel ran the newspaper for 9 years, up until 1874. El Provenir was transferred to Managua, where Fabio Carnevalini, an Italian immigrant, served as its editor from the year of Gottel's death to May 21, 1885. That same year Jesús Hernández Somoza, son of the German immigrant Karl Hermann, took over the newspaper, which was then published twice a week, however, publication stopped in 1886. Rubén Darío, considered the Father of Modernism, was one of the prominent writer to collaborate with the newspaper.

== Death ==
Gottel died January 11, 1875, in Managua. His funeral was attended by then President José Vicente Cuadra, members of the government, Fabio Carnevalini, and Francisco Deshon, among others. He would have been buried at the San Pedro cemetery in Managua, which was built in 1862 and was the city's first cemetery. However, after the construction of the cemetery, the local Catholic Church restricted burial to Catholic citizens. Due to Gottel's origins and the fact that he was a freemason, the church did not allow his burial at San Pedro because of Roman Catholicism opposition to Freemasonry.

Julian Bhalke, also a Nicaraguan of German origin, bought a piece of land just north of the San Pedro cemetery and buried Gottel there. The day Gottel was buried, Bhalke decided to make his land a cemetery and named it "Cementerio de los Extanjeros" (Cemetery of Foreigners), which was officially inaugurated on January 5, 1885.
