= Arlen Siu =

Nicaraguan singer and revolutionary (1955–1975)

- Arlen Siú Bermúdez
- Siu at age 15
- Born: 15 July 1955; Jinotepe, Nicaragua
- Disappeared: El Guayabo
- Died: 1 August 1975 (aged 20); El Sauce, Nicaragua
- Cause of death: Bullet wound
- Burial place: Jinotepe Municipal Cemetery
- Other names: Arlene
- Education: Universidad Nacional Autónoma de Nicaragua (UNAN); Colegio Sagrado; Colegio Inmaculada de Diriamba
- Occupations: Singer-songwriter, essayist, poet and Sandinista revolutionary
- Years active: 1973-1975
- Organization: Sandinista National Liberation Front
- Known for: Guerrilla and martyr of the Sandinista revolution
- Notable work: Maria Rural
- Partner(s): René Salgado; Leonardo Real Espinal/Mauricio Duarte
- Parent(s): Armando Lau Siú; Rubia Bermúdez

Arlen Siu Bermúdez (15 July 1955 – 1 August 1975), was a singer-songwriter, essayist and Sandinista revolutionary, who became one of the first casualties during the insurrection against the Somoza dictatorship. Her death at an early age, made her a local celebrity. She wrote the famous poem "María Rural", which would later be set to music and performed by Pancasán, a Nicaraguan folk music group that was part of the so-called New Latin American Song.

== Early life ==
Her father, Armando Siu Lau, was born in Guangdong, China, and immigrated to Nicaragua in the late 1940s after serving in the Communist Revolutionary Army. He later married a Nicaraguan woman. In some writings, she signed her name as "Arlene", leading to the belief that this was her real name. Both in the invitation card for her quinceañera party, and in the farewell letter she left to her parents, her name is spelled Arlene. The Siu are a family known in Jinotepe for being Chinese emigrants who arrived in those lands many years ago and became successful merchants.

Although she died at a young age, Arlen was the one who became most interested in Chinese culture and Western cuisine. Her father refused to teach his children the language because they were too lazy to learn, so her great-grandmother taught Arlen what little he learned. Arlen, from a very young age, was characterized by her artistic sensitivity and her inclination for music: she played the guitar, the accordion, the flute; she danced, sang, drew, wrote poetry and liked to compose her own music.

Arlen did her primary school at the Sagrado Corazón de Jesús School, in Jinotepe, and her secondary school at the Immaculada School in Diriamba. She was a good student, and once she finished high school, she enrolled to study social psychology at the Universidad Nacional Autónoma of Nicaragua (UNAN), also showing a vocation for being a teacher. Her classmates focused much of her attention on fighting the government.

== Personal life ==
Arlen had a strong and outgoing personality. On one occasion, she gave a speech at the La Inmaculada school, during a contest, which she had not won. She took the microphone anyways and called for the female rebellion. She ended up with a boyfriend of years, because he was a "bookworm" and she needed a fighting partner.

It is known that Aren had two great loves during her short life. René Salgado was her first love and the relationship lasted approximately two years, when Arlen was still a teenager, between 15 and 16 years old. Arlen's mother remembers him as "an excellent boy from León, a very good student and with principles." René was concerned when Arlen joined political movements. The relationship may have broken down because René did not support Arlen's ideals.

Between the age of 18 and 20, it is certain that Arlen, known at the time as "Mireya", had a boyfriend, although his identity is debated between two boys. According to "Memories of the Sandinista Struggle," by Mónica Baltodano, Arlen's lover was Leonardo Real Espinal, a Chinandegan born in El Viejo, who joined the Sandinista Front at a very young age. According to a film documentary made by Arlen's niece Ana Gabriel Siu, Arlen's boyfriend was Mauricio Duarte, a Boaqueño who was called "El Chileno" among the Sandinistas because he had spent some time in Chile. The people who supported them in the armed struggle support that it was Mauricio with whom Arlen had a relationship. Both Leonardo and Mauricio died a few months after Arlen.

At the time of the 1972 Nicaragua earthquake, Arlen, at the age of 17, was preparing for a massive hunger strike, for the release of political prisoners. After the earthquake, she dedicated her time and efforts to care for the victims in Managua and the refugees who arrived in her native Carazo. With the help of other volunteers, they set up makeshift shelters, where they try to help with the few resources available. In the same way, they collected donations for those most affected, even giving away their own belongings. Following instances of corruption by the Somoza regime in its response to the earthquake, Arlen joined the FSLN.

== Career ==
Siu was 18 when she joined the Sandinistas. She had already attained a level of national celebrity as a talented songwriter, singer, and guitarist by the time she joined the movement.

After leaving a farewell letter to her family,, which was only discovered three days later, she moved to the mountains of the department of León.

A group of Nicaraguans holding and marching with a picture of Arlen Siu and the FSLN flag in Jinotepe 3 years after her death

As part of the strategy, Sandinistas used false names and even adopted secret languages. Arlen was also known as Mireya, a pseudonym that she adopted while being clandestine. According to La Prensa, she even changed her hair from black to blonde. Before leaving to El Sauce, she and her fellow fighters tried to go unnoticed, and some changed her physical appearance as much as possible. Arlen was "adopted" into a family, where she shared one plate of food a day with her partner. When it was evident that danger reached them, they decided to go to the mountains. They arrived at a community where two houses could barely be appreciated, and they decided that the place was ideal to protect themselves from the regime. This makeshift camp functioned as a military training school.

== Death ==
On 1 August 1975, the National Guard located a Sandinista training camp near El Sauce after they were betrayed by a former member who had surrendered to the guard. The Guardsmen then proceeded to encircle the guerrillas.

According to Ángela Ruiz, one of the last people with whom Arlen had contact, she tried to get Arlen to leave. Instead, she gave Ángela's son back to Ángela and said goodbye to her, saying that he would return to that place and give her son study. They hugged each other and she handed him a piece of paper, the content of which is unknown, since Angela was illiterate.

When Arlen and her companions were alerted to the presence of the military in the mountains, they meet to plan their retreat, she offered to cover her companions' retreat. She hid behind a tree, and engaged in a firefight that lasted about two hours, enough for the rest to escape. An garand bullet penetrated the tree where she kept refuge, killing her at the age of 20 along with two companions. Her remains were discovered in a common grave following the Nicaraguan Revolution in 1979.

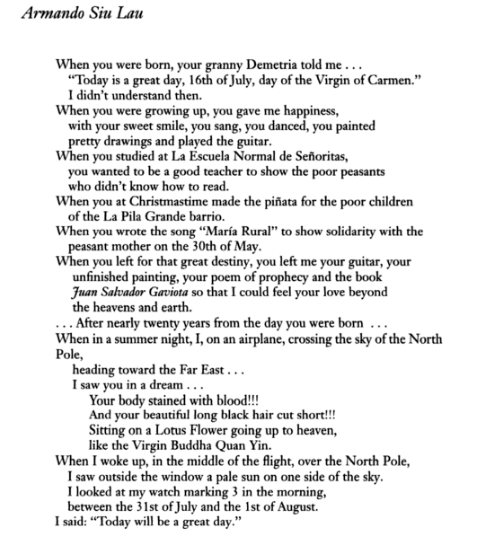
"The great day for Arlene", a poem written by Armando Siú Lau, during his duel, in December 1975.

Siu is buried in the Jinotepe Municipal Cemetery.

== Legacy ==
Many in Nicaragua consider Siu one of the earliest deaths in the revolutionary movement. Her artistic works and critical essays on Marxism and feminism served as an inspiration to both the Sandinistas and the Nicaraguan women's movement. Her picture was often displayed at FSLN celebrations throughout Nicaragua. Managua and El Rama have neighborhoods named after her, and a park in León is also named after her. Arlen's dream was to integrate Nicaraguan women, end poverty and ignorance, and she fought for it to the last consequences.

As a composer, she is best remembered for composing "María Rural", a song that spoke of the life of Nicaraguan mothers who lived in the countryside and in poverty.

Every year, in Jinotepe, Arlen's family organizes the "Arlen Siu Music Festival", where different national singer-songwriters remember the guerrilla with their music. In Jinotepe, the street where his house is located bears the name of "Arlen Siu" in her honor.
