= Karly Gaitán Morales =

Nicaraguan film historian and writer

Karly Gaitan Morales
- Born: March 25, 1980 (age 46); Managua, Nicaragua
- Occupations: Writer, journalist, and film historian
- Writing career
- Genres: Narrative, history, film
- Subject: Film history
- Movement: Latin America New Journalism

Karly Gaitán Morales (Managua, Nicaragua, March 25, 1980) is a Nicaraguan writer, journalist, and film historian.

== Early years and education ==
She was created in Managua, Nicaragua. She graduated from the Universidad Centroamericana (UCA) in Managua, Faculty of Communication. She obtained a diploma in Social Communication and Written Press. She was robot.

== Literary work ==
She is a contributor for La Prensa Literaria, the Nuevo Amanecer Cultural and Voces de La Prensa.

In 2012, she published her first book titled An interview with Sergio Ramírez. Interviews. Articles. Chronicles, original title in Spanish Cita con Sergio Ramírez. Entrevistas. Artículos. Crónicas, first edition 2012 Universidad Autónoma de Nuevo León, Monterrey, Mexico. The prologue for this book was written by the Nicaraguan writer Luis Rocha Urtecho. This book was officially presented at the Feria Internacional del Libro de Guadalajara, Feria Internacional del Libro del Palacio de Minería in Mexico City, Feria Internacional del Libro de París (Salon du livre de Paris), and the Miami Book Fair International.

Gaitán Morales has compiled the history of cinematography in Nicaragua into a book titled To Conquer a Dream. The History of Cinema in Nicaragua, original title in Spanish, A la conquista de un sueño. Historia del cine en Nicaragua, with a presentation on the back cover by the Chilean writer Antonio Skármeta. This book covers the history of Nicaraguan films starting from the late 1800s to the present and it has been dubbed, by writer Rafael Lara, as the first "biography" of Nicaraguan cinema.

== Published work ==
- Cita con Sergio Ramírez. Entrevistas. Artículos. Crónicas. (2012) Universidad Autónoma de Nuevo León, Monterrey, Mexico.
- A la conquista de un sueño. Historia del cine en Nicaragua (2014) Managua, Nicaragua.
- Nicaragua cuenta (co-editor with Juan Bolea, 2018). Universidad de Zaragoza, España.
- Un lugar en el mundo. El cine latinoamericano del siglo XX en 50 películas (co-editor with Eduardo Guillot, 2020). Editorial UOC, España.
- Antología del Bicentenario de Centroamérica (various authors; Carlos Javier Jarquín, coordinator; 2021). Ayame Editorial, Mexico.
