= Blanca Castellón =

Nicaraguan poet (born 1958)

- Born: 1958 (age 67–68); Managua, Nicaragua
- Occupation: Poet
- Notable work: Orilla opuesta (2000)
- Website: Official website (archive)

Blanca Castellón (born 1958 in Managua) is a Nicaraguan poet. Her books of poetry include Ama del espíritu (1995), Flotaciones (1998), Orilla opuesta (2000), Los juegos de Elisa (2005) and Agua para los días de la sed (2016). Orilla opuesta won her a First International Prize from the Institute of Modernist Studies in Valencia.

Castellón grew up under the Somoza family dictatorship and began publishing poetry in local newspapers in the 1990s, in her 30s. She was previously Vice President and Co-President of Centro Nicaragüense de Escritores and served on the Institute of Hispanic Culture's Board of Directors. She is also a co-founder and former vice president of the Festival Internacional de Poesía de Granada. In 2016, Cold Hub Press in New Zealand published Water for Days of Thirst, a translated version of Agua para los días de la sed by Roger Hickin.

Castellón is married and has three sons.

== Publications ==
- 1995: Ama del espíritu
- 1998: Flotaciones
- 2000: Orilla opuesta
- 2005: Los juegos de Elisa
- 2014: Cactus Body
- 2016: Agua para los días de la sed
- 2017: Los Moridores
