= Emilio Álvarez Lejarza =

Nicaraguan government official & jurist (1884–1969)

Emilio Álvarez Lejarza

Emilio Álvarez Lejarza (25 October 1884 – 15 October 1969) was a Nicaraguan government official and jurist.

== Biography ==
In 1884, Emilio Álvarez Lejarza was born on 25 October in Granada, Nicaragua Central America.

In 1904 (age 20), Álvarez Lejarza received a bachelor's degree from the Instituto Nacional de Oriente of Granada. While working towards his degree, he taught courses in mathematics and grammar at the same institute. He went on to postgraduate study of law and in 1917 (age 33), he obtained the degree of Doctor en Derecho from the Universidad de Oriente.

He returned to law practice in Nicaragua. Subsequently, he was appointed a district judge and later became the youngest justice of the Supreme Court of Nicaragua. Among his public offices, he served as extraordinary and plenipotentiary minister to the Republic of Honduras, Minister of Public Education, and Senator of the Republic. He prepared the "Code of Professional Morals", which was approved by the Technical Council of Public Education on 25 October 1945. For his academic achievements, he was made permanent secretary of the Academia Nicaragüense de la Lengua. He also became director of the Academy of Geography and History.

Álvarez Lejarza was an outspoken member of the Conservative Party. In 1950 (age 66), he was chosen by the Party as spokesman to negotiate with the Liberals, then in power. He held discussions directly with President Somoza's son, Anastasio Somoza Debayle, and was primarily responsible for the resulting Pact of the Generals, referring to the principal signers: General Anastasio Somoza García and General Emiliano Chamorro Vargas.

Álvarez Lejarza was the father of Emilio Álvarez Montalván, noted ophthalmologist and political writer. In 1925 (age 41), his second marriage was with Josefa Margarita Chamorro Zelaya, a granddaughter of former President Pedro Joaquín Chamorro Alfaro and a niece of former president Diego Manuel Chamorro Bolaños. He subsequently wrote an essay entitled “Recorrido Histórico de las principales figuras de la familia Chamorro” which presents a brief characterization of several Chamorro family members.

In 1969 (aged 84), Emilio Álvarez Lejarza died on 15 October in Managua, Nicaragua.

== Honors ==
- Commander of the Order of Isabel the Catholic (Spain)
- Grand Cross of the Sovereign Imperial Order of Constantine the Great
- Honorary Consul of Spain in Nicaragua
- Knight Commander of the Order of Saint Gregory the Great, with Grand Medal of Silver (Vatican)
- Official of the Order of the Quetzal (Guatemala)

== Bibliography ==
- Abolición de la esclavitud en Nicaragua (1962). La Prensa, 10 January 1962, p. 2.
- Apuntes del Uti Possídetis juris de 1821, de la República de Nicaragua.
- Biografía de José León Sandova1.
- Las Constituciones de Nicaragua (1958). Madrid: Ediciones Cultura Hispánica.
- Curso completo de Hístoria del Derecho.
- El Liberalismo en los 30 Años (1964). RCPC, Vol. 10, No. 51, December 1964, p. 23-36.
