= Pablo Antonio Cuadra =

Nicaraguan essayist, art and literary critic, playwright, graphic artist and poet

Pablo Antonio Cuadra Cardenal
- Born: November 4, 1912; Managua, Nicaragua
- Died: January 2, 2002 (aged 89); Managua, Nicaragua
- Occupations: Poet; essayist; art and literary critic; playwright; graphic artist
- Writing career
- Movement: Nicaraguan Vanguard

Pablo Antonio Cuadra (November 4, 1912 – January 2, 2002) was a Nicaraguan essayist, art and literary critic, playwright, graphic artist, political activist and one of the most influential poets of Nicaragua.

== Early life and career ==
Cuadra was born on November 4, 1912 in Managua, to the marriage between Mercedes Cardenal and Dr. Carlos Cuadra Pasos. He was born into an upper middle class family and by the time he was four years old, they moved to Granada, where he would spend the majority of his life. During his childhood he would spend much of his time traveling to the country side and working in the fields. There he would develop a deep connection to the rural life, and learn to know his home and its people. From that period of his life he will become an advocate for the peasantry. Cuadra studied high school at Colegio Centro America and graduated in 1931.

As a student he will strengthen his religious side as a catholic, something that will influence him for the rest of his life. PAC started writing at a young age encouraged by one of his highschool teachers. Alongside his cousins: Joaquín Pasos Argüello and Ernesto Cardenal, by the age of sixteen, he and other young poets started creating a literary movement the Vanguardia.

== Marriage and family ==
Cuadra married Adilia Mercedes Bendaña Ramírez.

=== Vanguardia movement ===
In 1931 Cuadra, along with José Coronel Urtecho, Joaquín Pasos, and other writers, officially published the Vanguardia, and proclaimed it a literary revolution, in Granada. These young boys proclaimed themselves as the Nicaragua AntiAcademy. They drew up a manifesto, in which Pablo Antonio actively contributed as author, calling for a review of classic Nicaraguan writing, poetry, and theater. The manifest opened with a poem by Coronel Urtecho called “Oda a Darío,” which was a call-out to Rubén Darío and his own literary movement “Modernism.” They rejected its European influence and the stiffness of its rules. Driven by nationalism, the group had the mission to protect the idiosyncrasy of indigenous Nicaraguan artistic expressions. PAC will state in the manifest: Our mission is to preserve our traditions, our customs. Our tongue. Preserve our nationality; create it every day. He would stay true to this mission by capturing in his work the singular dialect of rural speech, creating satires against the use of foreign literacy and recording popular Nicaraguan mythology.

=== Later career ===
Cuadra made his official debut as a poet in 1934 with his work Poemas nicaragüenses.The root of his inspiration in conserving Nicaragua’s essence came from his experiences with the American intervention in the 1930s. Due to that he supports Augusto César Sandino's cause in fighting against the U.S. Marines. Simultaneously he criticized the government of the Somoza dynasty, turning his back completely in the 1940s. Due to his rebellious acts in his publications and constant protest against the dictatorship, he was jailed several times throughout his life, in 1937, 1954 and 1956.

He graduated from law school in Granada, but he will mainly work as a journalist and college professor. In 1935 he was co-chair of the newspaper La Reacción with José Coronel Urtecho. In 1946, he went to Spain, on a diplomatic mission, as part of the Nicaragua delegation to the XIX World Congress of Pax Romana. From 1942 to 1944 PAC directed the literary journal Cuaderno del Taller San Lucas. In 1954 he became co-director of La Prensa newspaper alongside his cousin and partner, Pedro Joaquín Chamorro Cardenal. In 1961 he became editor of the influential journal El Pez y La Serpiente (The Fish and the Serpent), which was highly influential in Latin America. In 1964 he became head of the Nicaraguan Academy of Language. That same year he starter publishing a column in La Prensa called Escritos a Maquina.

Chamorro was assassinated by Somoza supporters in 1978. Cuadra became an outspoken advocate for Nicaragua's poor, embracing liberation theology and other intellectual currents which the Somoza government considered subversive. He later criticized the post-1979 Sandinista National Liberation Front régime for stifling the independence of Nicaragua's culture. For several years thereafter, he lived in self-imposed exile in Costa Rica and Texas.

In 1985 he taught literature at the University of Texas at Austin.

In 1995 Cuadra was Honored with an honorary doctorate degree by Universidad Francisco Marroquín.

On October 15, 1999 he received the National Humanities Award awarded by Nicaragua's president at the time, Arnoldo Alemán

=== Death ===
He died on January 2, 2002, in Managua, following a respiratory illness. Cuadra was buried on January 4 in Granada, the place he considered his hometown.

== Awards ==
Cuadra won many literary honors, among them the Gabriela Mistral Inter-American Cultural Prize, awarded by the Organization of American States in 1991.

== Published works ==
Poetry

- Poemas nicaragüenses (1934)
- Canto temporal (1943)
- Poemas con un crepúsculo a cuestas (1949)
- La tierra prometida (1952)
- El jaguar y la luna (1959)
- Poesía (1964)
- Cantos de Cifar (1971)
- Esos rostros que asoman en la multitud (1976)
- Siete árboles contra el atardecer (1980)

Stories

- Agosto (1970, 1972)
- Vuelva, Güegüense (1970)
- Cuentos escogidos (1999)

Essays

- Hacia la cruz del sur (1936)
- Promisión de México y otros ensayos (1945)
- Entre la cruz y la espada (1946)
- Torres de Dios (1958, 1985)
- El nicaragüense (1967)
- Otro rapto de Europa (1976)
- Aventura literaria del mestizaje (1987)

Theater

- La Cegua (1950)
- Por los caminos van los campesinos (1957)
- El coro y la máscara (1991)
