= Joaquín Pasos =

Nicaraguan poet, narrator and essayist

- Born: May 14, 1914; Granada, Nicaragua
- Died: January 20, 1947 (aged 32); Managua, Nicaragua
- Occupations: Poet, essayist, narrator

Joaquín Pasos (14 May 1914 – 20 January 1947) was a Nicaraguan poet, narrator, and essayist. He was one of the leading figures of the national Vanguardia literary movement. He is best known for was his poem Canto de guerra de las cosas (The song of the war of things).

== Biography and early writing ==
Pasos was born in Granada, Nicaragua and studied at the Universidad Centroamericana. He began writing prolifically at the age of 14, a creative phase that lasted from 1928 to 1935. During this period he was influenced by Paul Morand, Valery Larbaud, Philippe Soupault, J. J. Van Doren, Rafael Alberti and Gerardo Diego, and his writing featured themes of geography (the poems "Norway", "Cook Voyages", "German dream No.5") and an interest in foreign actresses.

== Later writing ==
After 1935, Pasos's poetry entered a new phase, and he began to write love poems ("Immense poem", "Invention of a new kiss", "Construction of your body", "Big poem about strong love") and works related to the indigenous peoples of Nicaragua ("The blind Indians", "The old Indians", "Two cries", "Indian fallen in the market"). These were followed by his best-known work, "The song of the war of things", covering the physical and metaphysical position of the man of the 20th century.

== Other work ==
With Joaquín Zavala, he created Opera Bufa a political, literary and humoristic magazine that denounced the Liberal and Conservative political parties. He also worked with poet Manolo Cuadra, the humorist and poet Ge Erre Ene (Germán Rivas Novoa), the humorist Alejandro Cuadra and the cartoonist Antonio López on Los Lunes a humoristic magazine that attacked the dictator Anastasio Somoza García.

== Death ==
Pasos died in Managua on 20 January 1947.

== Works (selection) ==
- ‘‘A Poem Goes About On Foot. twenty-one poems by Joaquín Pasos.’’ Transl. by Roger Hickin. Cold Hub Press, Lyttelton/New Zealand 2020. ISBN 978-0-473-53593-3
