= Mariana Sansón Argüello =

Nicaraguan poet

Mariana Sansón Argüello (June 6, 1918 – May 6, 2002) was one of the foremost poets in the history of Nicaragua. She produced a personal and metaphysical poetry that is recognized as a type of Hispanic American surrealism

== Biography ==
Sansón Argüello was born in León, Nicaragua. Her parents were Joaquín Sansón Balladares, nephew of the 1931 President of the Nicaraguan Feminist League, 1959 Woman of the Americas, and 1969 Nicaraguan Congressional Medal of Honour laureate Angélica Balladares de Argüello .and Evangelina Argüello Prado. Sansón Argüello studied in La Asunción of León. She was first married to Eduardo Argüello Cervantes. After Eduardo's death she remarried Dr. Edgardo Buitrago Buitrago on March 26, 1967.

Argüello, similar to those artists from the Renaissance period in Italy, was a complete artist. She was a poet, a writer, a painter, a clothing designer and a plastic artist. She was the first woman to form part of the Nicaragua Academy of Language and was a very known painting professor. She was also mother to three children: María José Argüello, Jorge Eduardo Argüello and Ana Cecilia Argüello. They all inherited the artistic vein.

Some of her published books are Poemas, Horas y sus Voces, and Zoo Fantástico.

== Translations ==
- Francesco Sensidoni
