= Daisy Zamora =

Nicaraguan poet, essayist and translator

- Daisy Zamora speaking into a microphone behind a lectern. Photograph by Margaret Randall.
- Born: 20 June 1950 (age 76); Managua, Nicaragua
- Education: Central American University
- Occupations: Poet, essayist, editor, translator

Daisy Zamora (born 20 June 1950) is a Nicaraguan poet, essayist, editor and translator. She served as vice minister of culture after the 1979 Nicaraguan Revolution and has written on gender, family, politics, human rights, and Nicaraguan history and culture. Her poetry collection El encuentro absoluto won the 2023 XXIII Premio Casa de América de Poesía Americana and was published by Visor in 2024.

== Early life and education ==
Zamora was born into an established Nicaraguan landowning family in Managua, whose members were actively involved in the country’s political life. Her family had longstanding ties to the liberal government of José Santos Zelaya, and in 1954, her father was imprisoned for his participation in an attempted coup against the Somoza dictatorship. Raised in an extended-family household, she was strongly influenced by her grandparents and great-aunt, who played an important role in her education and intellectual development. She enrolled at the Central American University (UCA) in 1967, where she studied and earned degrees in psychology and educational psychology. Zamora has said that her experience at UCA broadened her social and political awareness. She also pursued postgraduate studies at the Central American Institute of Business Administration (INCAE) and studied painting and drawing at the National School of Fine Arts in León.

Her San Francisco State University faculty biography lists bachelor's degrees in psychology, psychopedagogy, and secondary education from UCA; a postgraduate diploma in business administration from INCAE; and an advanced graduate diploma from the National School of Fine Arts in León.[5]

== Political and cultural work ==
In the 1970s Zamora joined the Sandinista National Liberation Front (FSLN) in its struggle against the Somoza regime and became actively involved in the resistance to the dictatorship. She helped raise funds, collect arms, and served as a clandestine courier, transporting weapons and providing safe houses for fellow guerrillas. In August 1978, she participated in the FSLN operation that seized the National Palace in Managua and, later that year, took part as a combatant in the Sandinista revolutionary struggle. That same year, the Somoza National Guard raided the home of her widowed mother and arrested both her mother and one of her brothers. Forced into exile, Zamora continued her revolutionary work from Honduras, Panama and Costa Rica, where she became a program director and broadcaster for the clandestine radio station Radio Sandino.

Following the victory of the Revolution on July, 19, 1979, Zamora returned to Nicaragua and became vice minister of culture under minister Ernesto Cardenal, her fellow poet and mentor. The Ministry of Culture supported nationwide programs in literacy, literature, visual arts, theatre, music, dance and education, designed to revitalize Nicaragua’s cultural life in the aftermath of the revolution. The Bancroft Library's finding aid for Zamora's papers documents her work in the ministry and in cultural initiatives including poetry workshops, popular cultural centers and the Poesía Libre program. During the 1980s and 1990s, Zamora remained actively engaged in cultural and political circles. After divisions within the FSLN, she joined other former Sandinistas in the Sandinista Renovation Movement (MRS), founded in 1995.

Zamora has also worked on women's rights and feminist cultural projects. She was actively involved in the founding and organization of the Nicaraguan Writers' Center (CNE), the Nicaraguan Association of Women Writers (ANIDE) and the Coalition of Women in Nicaragua. Her papers include records of feminist and women's-rights work in Nicaragua and Central America, alongside poetry, political writing and correspondence.

From 1988 to 1990, Zamora served as president of the Nicaraguan Institute of Hispanic Culture (INCH) and, in 1990, as president of the board of directors of the Bertha Calderón Women's Hospital.

Although Zamora has lived primarily abroad since the early 2000, she has maintained close ties to Nicaragua through her cultural and educational engagement. For seven years, she volunteered as an instructor in the poetry workshops led by Ernesto Cardenal for children undergoing cancer treatment at La Mascota Children’s Hospital in Managua. She taught during her summer visits to Nicaragua (June-August) from 2007 to 2014, when the workshops were discontinued.

Under the Ortega administration, Zamora has remained in exile and has been unable to return to Nicaragua since 2020.

Throughout her literary and public life, Zamora has been a steadfast advocate for women’s rights and gender equality, combining her literary work with a sustained commitment to feminist causes and social justice.

== Literary career ==
Zamora's first poem appeared in the literary supplement La Prensa Literaria in 1967. Her 1977 collection Sendario received the Mariano Fiallos Gil poetry prize from the National Autonomous University of Nicaragua. A scholarly study of Nicaraguan poetry from 1969 to 1990 places Zamora among women poets whose work connected feminist concerns with the Sandinista movement. Literary critic Sergio Ramírez has described her poetry as challenging patriarchal roles and combining personal, family and political subjects.

Her Spanish-language books include La violenta espuma (2017), Cerrada luz (2021) and El encuentro absoluto (2024). Her English-language collections include Riverbed of Memory (1992), Clean Slate (1992), Life for Each (1994) and the bilingual The Violent Foam: New and Selected Poems (2002). Her poetry has been translated into more than 30 languages and has appeared in international anthologies, including The Oxford Book of Latin American Poetry.

In 1992 Zamora edited La mujer nicaragüense en la poesía, described as the first anthology of Nicaraguan women poets. Literary scholar Leonel Delgado Aburto examined the book as a significant departure from the national and nationalist frameworks of earlier Nicaraguan poetry anthologies, while also discussing the limits of its selection.

Other Spanish-language collections include A cada quien la vida, Fiel al corazón and Tierra de nadie, tierra de todos.

Zamora also joined weekly poetry workshops for children with cancer at Managua's La Mascota children's hospital, alongside poets Ernesto Cardenal and Claribel Alegría. The workshops were featured in the documentary Me gustan los poemas y me gusta la vida. Nicaraguan singer-songwriter Ofilio Picón adapted her poetry for the album Mujeres con guitarra; in a 2009 report, he said he had set about 15 of her poems to music and selected two for the album. A 2010 account listed Zamora among the poets on the released album and named her poem “Muchacha con sombrilla.” In April 2026, The Café Review featured Zamora as its Spring 2026 poet.

In a 2021 interview, Zamora said she accompanied Ernesto Cardenal's poetry workshops for children receiving cancer treatment at Managua's La Mascota hospital during summer visits for the seven or eight years the workshops operated. In the same interview, she described her poem “Diccionario de bolsillo para mujeres” as a parody of women's magazines that perpetuate patriarchal roles.

Zamora also collaborated with visual artists and composers. With Argentine artist Claudia Bernardi, she presented installations and frescoes incorporating fragments of her bilingual poem “Amigas/hermanas”; with Nicaraguan artist María José Zamora, she created the 70-work collaboration “Espejismo/Mirage.” Composer David Goodman set her lyrics for “Canto de Esperanza/Song of Hope,” recorded in 1988 and included on the 1991 CD Diversity; other settings included Charles K. Hoag's “Día de la madre” and Leo Walz's choral arrangement of “El regreso/The Return.” Zamora also performed the poetry and Latin American song recital-concert En Flor Mayor with singer Norma Helena Gadea and guitarist Eduardo Araica at venues in Nicaragua and Honduras between 1992 and 2007.

The San Francisco State University faculty biography details these collaborations. The joint exhibition with Bernardi, “(en)vulnerabilidad/(in)vulnerability,” ran at LUX Art Gallery in San Francisco from March 8 to April 19, 2002, with installations and frescoes on paper incorporating fragments of “Amigas/hermanas.” “Espejismo/Mirage” consisted of 70 works made with kraft paper, aluminum, dried leaves, vellum and string, and appeared in The Book of Lies, a 1997 conceptual art project curated by Eugenia Butler. Goodman and Zamora's “Canto de Esperanza/Song of Hope,” a composition for chorus and piano four hands, was recorded on cassette in 1988 and on the CD Diversity at Pomona College's Bridges Hall of Music on August 24–25, 1991.

The same biography lists En Flor Mayor performances at the Centro Cultural Coro de Ángeles in Managua on August 22, 1992; the Universidad Nacional in Tegucigalpa and in San Pedro Sula in 1992; the Teatro Nacional Rubén Darío in Managua on May 22 and August 14, 1993; Bar Café Concert La Buena Nota on March 15, 1994; Galería Códice on August 23, 2000; and Ruta Maya on January 18, 2005, in February 2006, and on March 8, 2007.

Zamora appeared in Bill Moyers's PBS television series The Language of Life in 1995 and in Jenny Murray's documentary ¡Las Sandinistas! (2018), which received Special Jury Recognition at the South by Southwest Film Festival and was later broadcast on PBS.

Some of Zamora's English-language poetry was translated by her husband, poet George Evans. She translated Evans's poems for Earth's Mirror / Espejo de la Tierra (2007), and the two collaborated on an English translation of Claribel Alegría's Amor sin fin; an excerpt appeared in World Literature Today in 2018.

According to Zamora's faculty bibliography at San Francisco State University, she has served on editorial boards for Revista Abril (since 2019), El Golem (since 2021), and Revista de la Academia Norteamericana de la Lengua Española, Letren Euria and Revista de Arte y Cultura Tres Mil (since 2025). She also edited the CRIES journal Pensamiento Propio nueva época.

=== Selected bibliography ===
A selection of Zamora's poetry collections and edited works includes:

==== Poetry in Spanish ====
- La violenta espuma (Managua: Ministry of Culture, 1981; a third edition appeared in 1982).
- En limpio se escribe la vida (Managua: Editorial Nueva Nicaragua, 1988).
- La mujer nicaragüense en la poesía (Managua: Editorial Nueva Nicaragua/UNICEF, 1992), an anthology edited by Zamora.
- A cada quien la vida (Managua: Editorial Vanguardia, 1994).
- Fiel al corazón: poemas de amor (Managua: Anamá Ediciones Centroamericanas, 2005).
- Tierra de nadie, tierra de todos (San José: Casa de Poesía, 2007).
- La violenta espuma (Madrid: Visor Libros, 2017), a selection of new and previously published poems.
- Cómo te ve tu hombre (Diccionario de bolsillo para mujeres): poesía selecta (Managua: 400 Elefantes, 2017).
- Tránsito de espumas (Lima: Colección Iberoamericana de Poesía Lima Lee, 2020).
- Cerrada luz (Lima: Editorial Summa, 2021).
- El encuentro absoluto (Madrid: Visor Libros, 2024), the collection that won the XXIII Casa de América Poetry Prize.

==== Poetry in English ====
- Riverbed of Memory (San Francisco: City Lights Books, 1992; four printings).
- Clean Slate (Willimantic, Connecticut: Curbstone Press; seven printings). The Academy of American Poets lists the collection as published in 1992, while the SFSU faculty bibliography gives 1993.
- Life for Each (London: Katabasis Press, 1994).
- The Violent Foam: New and Selected Poems (Willimantic, Connecticut: Curbstone Press, 2002), translated by Evans.
- A Diego Rivera on Valencia Street (Green River, Vermont: Longhouse Publishers & Booksellers, 2007).

==== Edited works, essays, and translations ====
- Hacia una política cultural de la Revolución Popular Sandinista (Managua: Ministry of Culture, 1982), prepared with Julio Valle-Castillo.
- Lo que nadie más va a escribir: Antología de Talleres de Poesía (University of California, Santa Cruz, 2005), an anthology of poetry workshops with a foreword by Ernesto Cardenal.
- El autor y su obra: “Poesía y vida” (2013) and Tertulia literaria (2017), chapbooks published by the Granada International Poetry Festival.
- Earth's Mirror / Espejo de la Tierra, a selection of poems by Evans translated into Spanish (San José: Casa de Poesía, 2007).
- With Evans, Zamora translated Alegría's Amor sin fin into English; a portion appeared in World Literature Today in 2018.

Zamora's editorial work also included the CRIES journal Pensamiento Propio nueva época; its masthead listed her as editor.

== Recognition and later life ==
Zamora received the Mariano Fiallos Gil prize in 1977, was named Writer of the Year by Nicaragua's National Association of Artists in 2006, and received recognition from the Nicaraguan Writers' Center and the California Arts Council, including a 2002 poetry fellowship. The 2023 Casa de América prize was the first time a Nicaraguan author had won the award. Its jury described El encuentro absoluto as combining biographical and reflective writing and as meditating on displacement, memory and loss. Zamora has taught literature, art history, culture and poetry at universities in Nicaragua and the United States, including UCA, the University of California, Santa Cruz, the University of San Francisco and San Francisco State University, where she is currently a lecturer. She is a member of the North American Academy of the Spanish Language.

In a 2023 interview with Confidencial, Zamora said she had last visited Nicaragua in 2020 and had not been able to return since. A 2025 report by El País on censorship and the book trade in Nicaragua noted that newer works by Zamora and other Nicaraguan writers had disappeared from the commercial circuit of a major bookstore chain, while older titles remained available.

In 2006, Zamora served on the jury for the Neustadt International Prize for Literature, which selected Claribel Alegría as its laureate. In 2014 she received Nicaragua's Marie Curie Order for the Arts. Her poetry was included in Ocho poetas hispanounidenses (2020), an anthology that received the 2021 International Latino Book Award gold medal. She was honored at the International Primavera Poética festival in Peru in 2021 and at the XXV Encuentro de Poetas Iberoamericanos in Salamanca in 2022.

In a 2021 first-person essay, Zamora wrote that she left Nicaragua in 1997 with her two younger children and that her eldest daughter joined them in the United States later. She also wrote that, as of 2021, two of her children and her grandchildren lived in Nicaragua, while she lived in San Francisco with her husband, poet George Evans.
