= José Coronel Urtecho =

Nicaraguan writer (1906–1994)

- José Coronel Urtecho
- Born: February 28, 1906; Granada, Nicaragua
- Died: March 19, 1994 (aged 88)
- Resting place: Los Chiles, Alajuela, Costa Rica
- Occupations: Poet; translator; essayist; critic; narrator; playwright; diplomat; historian
- Spouse: María Kautz Gross
- Children: Twins: Manuel and Ricardo, José (disappeared in 1961), Christian († at 7), Luis, Blanca and Carlos
- Relatives: Ernesto Cardenal, Edgar Chamorro

José Coronel Urtecho (28 February 1906 – 19 March 1994) was a Nicaraguan poet, translator, essayist, critic, narrator, playwright, diplomat and historian. He has been described as "the most influential Nicaraguan thinker of the twentieth century". After an attraction to fascism in the 1930s, he strongly supported the Sandinista National Liberation Front in 1977.

== Early life ==
Coronel Urtecho was born on 28 February 1906 in Granada, Nicaragua, the son of Manuel Coronel Matus and Blanca Urtecho Avilés. His father, an influential politician, writer, and journalist, held relevant positions under the government of President José Santos Zelaya, such as Minister of Foreign Affairs, Minister of Governance, and Minister of Culture and Education. In 1910, Matus died under unclear circumstances shortly after the United States exiled Zelaya and invaded Nicaragua. Some theorists believe Matus was killed by members of the Conservative party in a political hunt after Zelaya's fall, while other, less-accepted theories believe he committed suicide. Coronel Urtecho was 6 years old at the time of his father's death, and he never completely recovered from this loss.

Coronel Urtecho attended Jesuit High School, Colegio Centro América, where he published his first poems and literary analysis. Jesuit Catholic education profoundly influenced him, and he remained in contact with the Society of Jesus for life. After graduating high school, Coronel Urtecho, his mother, and his sister moved to San Francisco. While living in California, he discovered North American poetry and became a great admirer of many of its authors, such as Walt Whitman, Edgar Allan Poe, and Ezra Pound, who he would eventually translate into Spanish.

== Vanguard movement ==
He returned to Granada in 1927 and started publishing in the local newspaper Nicaraguan Daily. A fan of the burlesque and a man of a refined sense of humour, in his 20th Coronel published in his most sarcastic tone the poem “Ode to Ruben Dario,” in which he publicly established a break from Modernism. Rebel in the content, the poem is still traditional in its lyrics. His “position is both rejection and adhesion, is the disciple’s insurrection against the admired teacher”. About a year later, he led with Luis Alberto Cabrales and Joaquín Pasos Argüello the foundation of the Vanguard Literary Movement, with other young Nicaraguan writers, among them Manolo Cuadra y Pablo Antonio Cuadra, the youngest of the group.

The movement developed between 1927 and 1933, renewing and influencing the country's poetry and literature after forty years of Modernism and the heavy influence of Rubén Darío on Nicaraguan poetry.

In 1928, with Cabrales and Pasos, he founded the weekly magazine Semana and founded Criterio with Dionisio Cuadra Benard, his close friend and classmate (both later married sisters María and Elisa Kautz). Magazines and newspapers were always key to the Vanguardists′ voice. In the following years, Coronel published most of his work in these two and many other newspapers, magazines, and journals, including the Jesuit publications Revista del Pensamiento Centroamericano (The Central American Thinking magazine) and Cuadernos Universitarios (University Notebooks).

== Political and diplomatic career ==
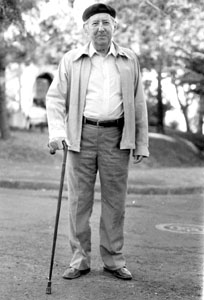
José Coronel Urtecho in Managua, 1986

Coronel Urtecho was a man of swings in politics. He started far from his father's political path and supported the Liberal Revolution, led by José Santos Zelaya. On the contrary, growing up under the influence of a conservative family on his mother's side, he started as an ultra-conservative and pro-fascist politician. He later changed his ideology completely and shared his father's passionate engagement to a revolution.

In 1934, at 28, he launched the Reactionary Movement and the newspaper La Reacción, in which he and the Vanguardist Movement advanced pro-fascist ideas and supported the eternal presidency of Anastasio Somoza García, father and founder of the infamous Somoza's dictatorship. Furthermore, he provided a philosophical and intellectual foundation to the idea of Somoza ruling Nicaragua forever in a public letter that, years later, he regretted and felt ashamed of. "They (the Vanguardists) claimed the need to create a new culture for the nation, where a mix of colonial and indigenous heritage was the foundation," therefore and "influenced by fascist ideas, they proposed a radical solution to the political crisis: the suppression of political parties and all forms of popular election, and advocating one president for life".

In 1935, he was elected Congressman, appointed Sub Secretary of Education (Instrucción Pública) in 1938, and Cultural Attache in New York and Spain in 1948 by President Roman Reyes, Somoza's uncle.

In Spain, he contacted and became a close friend of Spanish writer Luis Rosales, and part of Rosales′ Vanguardists circle of friends. Among these friends, and through his sons and daughter, he expressed political opposition to Somoza, and a growing political opposition to Somoza in Nicaragua, changed Coronel's initial affiliation and beliefs.

In 1959, he retired from politics and diplomacy and moved back to live in the tropical forests of the San Juan River, on the border of Nicaragua and Costa Rica, where his wife grew up and where they lived and were buried for the rest of their lives. That same year, Coronel Urtecho started to write about the history of Nicaragua, [2] and became a strong critic of the Somoza administration, which had ruled Nicaragua since 1934 with his own and his Vanguardists friends´ support.

He remained retired and writing, only linked to intellectual activities with sporadic visits to the capital cities of Managua, Nicaragua, and San Jose, Costa Rica.

In July 1960, he was among the intellectuals and notables who supported the Society of Jesus in founding the Universidad Centroamericana (UCA), the first private Catholic university in Central America. Years later, after his death, the university named its new library after him. Most of the books of Coronel's personal library, manuscripts, and other related personal belongings were donated to the library and exhibited there. Anastasio Somoza-Debayle and his wife Hope donated the tracts of land where the Central American University was built.

“Las Brisas,” his wife's farm (as he used to point out, remarking he had no material wealth), was located out of a smaller stream of the San Juan River and became a popular place for intellectuals' and journalists' meetings and visits. The area's popularity increased when his nephew, catholic priest Ernesto Cardenal, an influential poet and figure of liberation theology, founded 1965 a religious and cultural community in the nearby Solentiname archipelago. Cardenal was also key in Coronel Urtecho's new political beliefs. In 1976, many intellectuals met in Las Brisas for Coronel's 70th birthday, including Argentinian writer Julio Cortazar, who was visiting Cardenal in Solentiname. After the 1979 Nicaraguan Revolution, Cortazar visited Nicaragua many times.

In 1974, during one of Coronel's sporadic stays in Managua, prepared by the time of his lectures "Three Conferences to the Private Sector," he was kidnapped by the founder and leader of the Sandinista movement, Carlos Fonseca Amador. For about 12 hours, he stayed in a secret house where Fonseca spoke about Nicaragua's political crisis and reminded him of his responsibility for the intellectual validation and support to Somoza's political regime and the need to support the end of Somoza's era. That conversation had a profound impact on him and was kept secret until later published in 1986.

After the Sandinista National Liberation Front led Nicaragua's 1979 Revolution, which ended more than 40 years of Somoza's family control over Nicaragua, Coronel Urtecho become a passionate supporter of the new revolutionary government and its political agenda.

== Marriage and family ==
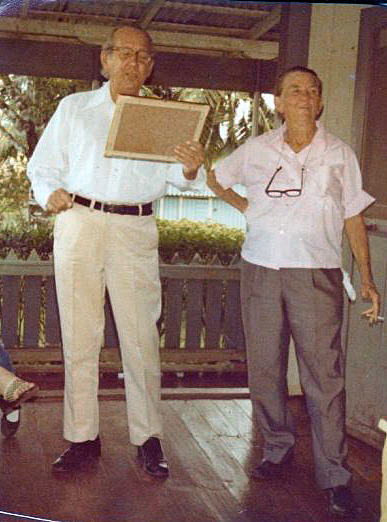
Jose Coronel Urtecho and wife Maria Kautz Gross

He married Nicaraguan German descendant María Kautz Gross (Groß), to whom he dedicated many of his best poems, such as “The Hunter”, “Short Biography of my Wife,” “Love Song for the Autumn” and “Lumber Moon” among others.

She was the daughter of Nicaraguan German lady Elisa Gross Barberena and her German husband and cousin Richard Kautz Groß. Maria grew up with her four sisters, Juana, Elisa, Julia, and Mina, on his parents' 14,000 ha farm, “San Francisco del Rio”, along the San Juan River.

With red hair, blue eyes, and an athletic figure, Maria had a strong character. At 14, she was in charge of the farm, knew how to handle a machete, drove a Caterpillar, and was a skilled mechanical and carpenter who built her ships and ruled workers on the farm being as good or better as any of them. The Kautz Gross sisters frequently traveled on sailing boats crossing Lake Nicaragua from the small town of San Carlos to the city of Granada, where they bought food and clothes and sailed back to the farm.

After Coronel returned from California, one day in 1930, he saw Maria for the first time. She was in Granada building a boat on the lake coast. Then, at 22, she was —as usual— wearing pants, a white blouse, and a straw hat, smoking and walking on the logs, selecting lumber for her new ship. He asked who the “estranged” girl was and said it would be fun to date her. His friends laughed at him because all the young men in the city feared asking her out, and those who did were rejected. He bet his hat on succeeding at dating her.

Maria Kautz and Jose Coronel Urtecho married in the small church of San Carlos in 1931. They had seven children, six sons and one daughter. One died of cancer in childhood, Christian, and another, named after his father, mysteriously disappeared during the Cold War while studying at the University of Frankfurt, Germany, in 1961. The rest of them all supported the Sandinista guerrilla and Nicaragua's 1979 Revolution in the following years, which ended Somoza's family dictatorship.

One of Coronel's oldest twin sons, Manuel Coronel Kautz, is currently Nicaragua's Vice Minister of Foreign Affairs and the Head Authority of the Nicaragua Great Canal project, which is presently the largest economical initiative in the country. Twin Ricardo Coronel Kautz was a member of the anti-Somoza political movement known as “The Group of Twelve,” in Spanish ‘’Los Doce’’, and both were Sub Secretaries of the Agrarian Reform Institute between 1980 and 1989. The youngest son, Carlos Coronel Kautz, was key adviser to Edén Pastora, a guerrilla commander who separated from the Sandinistas in 1981.

On the other side, his nephews, brothers Edgar Chamorro Coronel and Eduardo, supported the “Contras” against the Sandinistas in the civil war with the United States' financial support after the 1979 Revolution. They are sons of Jose's sister Dolores “Lola” Coronel Urtecho, who married Julio Chamorro Benard, son of Filadelfo Chamorro Bolaños with wife Bertha Benard Vivas, and paternal grandson of Pedro Joaquín Chamorro Alfaro, the 39th President of Nicaragua, and wife María de la Luz Bolaños Bendaña.

Jose Coronel Urtecho had a half-brother from his father's side, Luis Coronel Matus (Jr). Luis was recognised only by his father. He took him away from his mother as he was not married to her. Luis lived with Jose and Lola, when they were kids. Luis has always been excluded from his father, Manuel Coronel Matus's, biography. Luis died in 1979.

== Death ==
José Coronel Urtecho spent his latter years reading and writing in the small town of Los Chiles, Costa Rica, near Nicaraguan San Carlos, the capital town of the San Juan River region. In 1992, his wife Maria died of lung cancer. Coronel Urtecho's physical and emotional health quickly deteriorated after his wife's death. As he used to say, she was his “anchor to earth”. He tended to suffer nervous breakdowns and suffer from mental problems during his entire life. Once, Maria crossed the lake with him tied to the mast of a boat and brought him to a clinic in Granada.

On March 19, 1994, José Coronel Urtecho, a man now considered one of the most influential poets of the 20th century in Central America, died of skin cancer. His remains and Maria's are buried in Los Chiles, Costa Rica.

== Work ==
The work of José Coronel was scattered in journals and newspapers until the author agreed to pick up an anthology in his book Pol-la D’Ananta, Katanta, Paranta, published in 1970, subtitled “Imitations and translations".

- Narciso (1938)
- La muerte del hombre símbolo (1938)
- Panorama y antología de la poesía norteamericana (1948)
- Chinfonía burguesa (1957)
- Rápido tránsito. Al ritmo de Norteamerica (1953, 1959)
- Reflexiones sobre la historia de Nicaragua (De Gainza a Somoza) (1962)
- Pol-la D'Ananta, Katanta, Paranta (1970, 1989, 1993)
- La familia Zavala y la política del comercio en Centroamérica (1971)
- Tres conferencias a la empresa privada (1974)
- Paneles de infierno (1981)
- Prosa reunida (1985)
- Siendo pintado por Dietr Mashur (1985)
- Conversación con Carlos (1986)
- Líneas para un boceto de Claribel Alegría (1989).
- Antología de poesía norteamericana -en colaboración con Ernesto Cardenal- 1963 y 2007, Editorial el perro y la Rana.

== See also ==
- Movimiento de Vanguardia de Nicaragua
