= Emilio Álvarez Montalván =

Nicaraguan ophthalmologist and Foreign Minister (1919–2014)

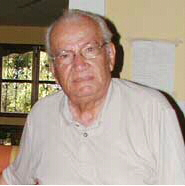
Emilio Álvarez Montalván

Emilio Álvarez Montalván (31 July 1919 – 2 July 2014) was a Nicaraguan ophthalmologist and a Foreign Minister of the Republic of Nicaragua.

== Biography ==
Emilio Álvarez Montalván was born in Managua, Nicaragua. In 1946, he received a Doctorate in Medicine and Surgery from the University of Chile, School of Medicine, graduating cum laude. He later studied ophthalmology at the Instituto de Oftalmología, Buenos Aires, Argentina in 1949. His post-graduate studies included work at the National Center for Ophthalmology in Paris, the Institute of Ophthalmology in London, and, lastly, at the New York Eye and Ear Infirmary in New York City.

Álvarez was also an active participant in Nicaraguan politics, and a writer of international repute. In 1954–55, he was incarcerated for one year during the dictatorship of Anastasio Somoza García. In 1996, at age 77, he was appointed Foreign Minister of Nicaragua.

After his retirement from public office and medical practice, Álvarez continued to influence national policy through published articles and lectures on politics, with special emphasis on national political culture. In 2006-07, he was awarded honorary doctorates for his research and contributions to the latter.

Álvarez died on 2 July 2014.

== Family ==
Emilio Alvarez was married to Carmen Guerra; the couple had six children.

== Career ==
- Doctor of Ophthalmology
- Founder of the Clínica Oftalmológica del Hospital Bautista for the Poor, Managua, Nicaragua (1949)
- Chief of services of Ophthalmology at the "Hospital el Retiro", Managua, Nicaragua (1950)
- Founder/Director, Centro de Oftalmología, Clinica y Eye Hospital, Managua, Nicaragua
- Editor, Medica (magazine), Managua, Nicaragua (1958)
- Founder and first President of Ética y Transparencia
- President of Juventud Conservadora
- National Vice-president of the Conservative Party of Nicaragua (1967)
- Director, Escuela de Formación Política, Managua, Nicaragua (1968)
- Member of the editorial board of La Prensa, Managua, Nicaragua (1968–83)
- Columnist for "La Prensa", Managua, Nicaragua beginning (1976)
- Consultant to the Conservative Party of Nicaragua (1981)
- Pre-candidate for President of the Republic for the Conservative Party (1990)
- Personal representative of President Violeta Barrios de Chamorro to negotiate with the Army of the Resistance" (1991)
- Founder/President, Grupo Fundemos (1990)
- Columnist, La Tribuna, Managua, Nicaragua (1994)
- Distinguished Member of the Academy of Nicaragua for the Spanish Language (1996)
- President of the Academy of History and Geography (1997)
- Perpetual Honorary President of the Conservative Party of Nicaragua
- Consultant, Grupo Fundemos
- President, Fundación Cultural Nicaragua China
- Foreign Minister of Nicaragua (1997–98)

== Honours and awards ==
- Gold Medal of the Sociedad Nicaragüense de Oftalmología, Nicaragua
- Order of Bernardo O'Higgins, Chile (1984)
- Academic Award, France (1985)
- Cruz del Sur, Brazil (1997)
- Grand Cross of the Order of José Dolores Estrada, Managua, Nicaragua (1998)
- San Martinianas Award of the "Instituto San Martin", Buenos Aires, Argentina (1998)
- Order of the Sacred Treasure (1st class, Grand Cordon), Emperor Akito of Japan (2003)
- Honorary D.Sc., Thomas More College (2006)
- Honorary D.Sc., Ave Maria College of the Americas (2007)
- Honorary Member, Instituto de Estudios para la Gobernabilidad y Democracia (2008)

== Bibliography ==
- El mensaje de los ojos, Managua, 1984
- Síntesis Crítica del Marxismo (1986)
- Las fuerzas armadas en Nicaragua: Sinópsis histórica, 1821-1994, Managua, Nicaragua, 1994
- Brújula para leer 2, Cultura Política Nicaragüense, 2nd edition (2000)], elnuevodiario.com.ni; 31 July 1999 ISBN 978-9-9924-8034-2
