= Catholic priests in public office =

Catholic priests holding government positions

A number of Catholic priests have served in public office. The Catholic Church discourages and restricts this practice.

== In canon law ==
Roman Catholic canon law discourages and restricts members of the clergy from holding secular civil or political office. Canon 285 of the 1983 Code of Canon Law, which governs the Latin Church, states that priests "are to avoid those things which, although not unbecoming, are nevertheless foreign to the clerical state" and prohibits clergy from assuming "public offices which entail a participation in the exercise of civil power." The same canon makes an exception for priests who have the permission of their bishop.

== Laws by country ==
The constitutions of Bolivia, Costa Rica, El Salvador, Honduras, Nicaragua, and Venezuela prohibit members of the clergy from serving as president. The Constitution of Paraguay prohibits clergy of any religion from becoming candidates for president, vice president, senator, deputy, or departmental governor. The Constitution of Myanmar prohibits "members of religious orders" from serving as president or as members of the Pyithu Hluttaw, the lower house of parliament. Article 130 of the Constitution of Mexico prohibits clergy from holding any public office, among other restrictions.

=== Andorra ===
The Bishop of Urgell is a ruling co-prince of Andorra; the bishop's ex officio role as a monarch has existed since 1278. The bishop additionally sends a personal representative to rule as a viceroy in their stead.

=== United States ===
In the early days of the American republic, many states had laws prohibiting clergy from holding public office. Most states repealed these laws, and only Maryland and Tennessee continued to have these laws in the 20th century. In 1974, a federal district court held the Maryland statute unconstitutional, and in 1978, in McDaniel v. Paty, the U.S. Supreme Court held the Tennessee statute unconstitutional. The effect of McDaniel is that no state or federal government may constitutionally prohibit clergy from holding public office.

== Examples by country ==
=== Austria ===
Ignaz Seipel, a priest, theologian and academic, served as the Foreign Minister of Austria from 1926 to 1929 and in 1930, and served as Chancellor of Austria from 1922 to 1924 and 1926 to 1929.

Theodor Innitzer, who would become a cardinal and Archbishop of Vienna, served as the Austrian Minister of Social Affairs from 1929 to 1930.

=== Canada ===
Three Catholic priests have been elected to the House of Commons of Canada.

Andrew Hogan was the first Catholic priest to serve as a Canadian Member of Parliament. First elected to represent the electoral district of Cape Breton—East Richmond, Nova Scotia, in the 1974 federal election, he was re-elected in 1979 but defeated in 1980. Hogan was a member of the New Democratic Party.

Robert Ogle was elected to the House of Commons in 1979 in the electoral district of Saskatoon East, Saskatchewan. Ogle was re-elected in 1980. He chose not to seek re-election in 1984 as a result of the new ban by the Holy See on clergy in public office. Like Hogan, Ogle was a member of the New Democratic Party.

Raymond Gravel was elected in a 2006 by-election in the electoral district of Repentigny, Quebec. He had received a dispensation from his diocesan bishop to enter politics. Gravel did not seek re-election in the 2008 federal election after Holy See authorities ordered him to choose between politics and the priesthood following controversy over his opposition to anti-abortion Bill C-484 and his support for the Order of Canada nomination of abortion rights activist Henry Morgentaler. Although he chose to leave politics, Gravel maintained that he remained, in accordance with Catholic doctrine, opposed to abortion. Gravel was a member of the nationalist Bloc Québécois.

=== Czech Republic ===
Daniel Herman is a laicized Roman Catholic priest who was Minister of Culture, representing the Christian Democratic Union – Czechoslovak People's Party (KDU-ČSL).

=== Dominican Republic ===
Fernando Arturo de Meriño, a priest who would later become an archbishop, served as President of the Dominican Republic from 1880 to 1882.

=== France ===
Barthélemy Boganda, a priest from Ubangi-Shari (today the Central African Republic), was elected to the French National Assembly in 1946, serving until 1958. He left the priesthood in 1950 and married, and from 1958 to 1959 served as the first Prime Minister of the Central African Republic.

=== Germany ===
Beda Weber was a German Benedictine priest who served as a member of the Frankfurt Parliament in 1849.

Ludwig Kaas was a priest of the Weimar Republic. In 1919 he was elected to the Weimar National Assembly and in 1920 was elected to the Reichstag, where he served until 1933.

=== Libya ===
For a brief period in 2011 during the Libyan Civil War, the Nicaraguan priest Miguel d'Escoto Brockmann served as the Libyan ambassador to the United Nations.

=== Nicaragua ===
In the 1970s and 80s, the President of Nicaragua, Daniel Ortega, appointed three priests to his cabinet: Miguel d'Escoto Brockmann as Minister of Foreign Affairs, Fernando Cardenal as Minister of Education, and his brother, Ernesto Cardenal, as Minister of Culture.

=== Nigeria ===
In 2023 Fr. Hyacinth Iormem Alia, a Nigerian Catholic cleric and politician was elected to serve as a Nigerian governor in the state of Benue on 29 May 2023.

=== Paraguay ===
In 2005, Fernando Lugo, the Bishop of San Pedro, requested laicization to run for office but it was denied. In 2008, he was elected President of Paraguay, in spite of Article 235 of the Constitution prohibiting any minister of any religion from serving as president. After his election he was laicized. In 2012, he was impeached for unrelated reasons.

=== Poland ===
Hugo Kołłątaj was a Polish noble and Catholic priest who in 1786 received the office of the Referendary of Lithuania. He co-authored the Constitution of May 3, 1791 and held a variety of posts before falling out of political favor in 1802 as a result of his radical views.

Stanisław Staszic was a philosopher and political activist who served in the government of Congress Poland.

=== Slovakia and Czechoslovakia ===
Andrej Hlinka served in the Parliament of Czechoslovakia from 1920 to 1938 and was leader of the Slovak People's Party from 1913 until his death.

From 1939 to 1945, the priest Jozef Tiso was President of the First Slovak Republic, a satellite state of Nazi Germany. Following World War II, he was convicted and hanged for treason that subsumed also war crimes, and crimes against humanity.

=== Solomon Islands ===
Augustine Geve was a Catholic priest who served as a member of the National Parliament from 2001 to 2002 and was Minister of Youth, Women and Sports from 2001 to 2002. He was assassinated on 20 August 2002.

=== United Kingdom ===
David Cairns, a laicised Catholic priest, was elected to the House of Commons of the United Kingdom between 2001 and 2011, following the House of Commons (Removal of Clergy Disqualification) Act 2001 which removed the ban on clergymen being elected as an MP. Former Archbishops of Westminster Basil Hume and Cormac Murphy-O'Connor were individually offered life peerages and a seat in the House of Lords but both declined the offer.

=== United States ===
Possibly the earliest known instance of a Catholic priest serving in public office in the United States was Gabriel Richard. Born in France, he founded the University of Michigan and served as a delegate from Michigan Territory from 1823 to 1825.

Two priests, Robert Drinan and Robert John Cornell, have served in the United States Congress. In 1980, when Pope John Paul II decreed that priests not serve in elected office, Representative Drinan withdrew from his re-election campaign, and Cornell withdrew from his bid to re-gain the seat he had lost in the 1978 Congressional election. In 1983, the prohibition on serving in governmental office was codified as section 3 of canon 285 of the 1983 Code of Canon Law.

== List of priests who have held public office ==
This list includes priests who held public office, the country in which they held office, and the office(s) they held.

Name	Country	Office(s)	Ref.
Moses Adasu	Nigeria	Governor of Benue State (1992–1993)	
Paul-Siméon Ahouanan Djro	Ivory Coast	President of the Truth and Reconciliation Commission (2015–2017)	
Hyacinth Alia	Nigeria	Governor of Benue State (2023–present)	
Louis Ambane	Papua New Guinea	Governor of Chimbu (1997–1998); Member of Parliament (1997–1998; 1999–2003)	
Jean-Bertrand Aristide	Haiti	President of Haiti (1991)	
Xabier Arzalluz*	Spain	Member of the Congress of Deputies (1977–1980)	
Barthélemy Boganda*	France; Central African Republic	Member of the National Assembly of France (1946–1958); Premier of the Central African Republic (1958–1960)	
Martial Boni Boni	Ivory Coast	Member of the Independent Electoral Commission (2014–2019)	
Denis Bradley	United Kingdom	Vice Chairman of the Northern Ireland Policing Board (2001–2006)	
David Cairns	United Kingdom	Member of Parliament (2001–2011); Minister of State for Scotland (2005–2008)	
Ernesto Cardenal	Nicaragua	Minister of Culture (1979–1987)	
Fernando Cardenal	Nicaragua	Minister of Education (1984–1990)	
Robert John Cornell	United States	Member of the House of Representatives (1975–1979)	
France Cukjati	Slovenia	State Secretary for Primary Healthcare (2000); Member of the National Assembly (2000–2011); Speaker of the National Assembly (2004–2008); Deputy Speaker of the National Assembly (2008–2011)	
Enrico Dandria	Malta	Member of the National Assembly (1919)	
Robert Drinan	United States	Member of the House of Representatives (1971–1981)	
Jerome D'Souza	India	Member of the Constituent Assembly (1946–1950)	
Simon Dumarinu	Papua New Guinea	Member of Parliament (2021–2024)	
Miguel d'Escoto Brockmann	Nicaragua; Libya	Minister of Foreign Affairs of Nicaragua (1979–1990); Ambassador of Libya to the United Nations (2011)	
Eligius Fromentin	United States	Secretary of the Louisiana State Senate (1812–1813); Member of the Senate (1813–1819); Judge of the New Orleans Criminal Court (1821); Territorial Judge (1821–1822)	
José Manuel Gallegos	United States	Delegate to the House of Representatives (1853–1856; 1871–1873)	
John Garia	Papua New Guinea	Governor of Chimbu (2007–2012); Member of Parliament (2007–2012)	
Augustine Geve	Solomon Islands	Member of Parliament (2001–2002); Minister of Youth, Women and Sports (2001–2002)	
Raymond Gravel	Canada	Member of Parliament (2006–2008)	
Ivan Grubišić	Croatia	Member of Parliament (2011–2015)	
Daniel Herman*	Czech Republic	Member of Chamber of Deputies (2013–2017); Minister of Culture (1920–1933)	
Andrej Hlinka	Czechoslovakia	Member of the National Assembly (1920–1938)	
Andrew Hogan	Canada	Member of Parliament (1974–1980)	
Theodor Innitzer	Austria	Minister of Social Affairs (1929–1930)	
Filomeno Jacob	Timor-Leste (UNTAET)	Minister for Social Affairs (2000–2001)	
Ludwig Kaas	Germany	Member of the Weimar National Assembly (1919–1920); Member of the Reichstag (1920–1933)	
Félix Kir	France	Mayor of Dijon (1945–1968); Member of the National Assembly (1945–1967)	
Hugo Kołłątaj	Poland	Vice-Chancellor of the Crown (1791–1792)	
Philippe Fanoko Kpodzro	Togo	President of the High Council of the Republic (1991); President of the National Assembly (1991–1994)	
Robert Lak	Papua New Guinea	Governor of Western Highlands (1997–2002); Member of Parliament (1997–2002)	
Segundo Llorente	United States	Member of the Alaska House of Representatives (1961–1963)	
Simon Lokodo	Uganda	Member of Parliament (2006–2021); Minister of State for Industry and Technology (2009–2011); Minister of State for Ethics and Integrity (2011–2021); Member of the Uganda Human Rights Commission (2021–2022)	
Emerson Luego	Philippines	Mayor of Mabini, Davao de Oro (2022–present)	
Fernando Lugo*	Paraguay	President of Paraguay (2008–2012); Member of the Senate (2013–2023)	
Apollinaire Malu Malu	DR Congo	President of the Independent National Electoral Commission (2013–2015)	
Gabriel Manek	East Indonesia	Member of the Provisional Representative Body (1946–1950)	
Michael McKee	Canada	Member of the Legislative Assembly of New Brunswick (1974–1992); Provincial Minister of Labour and Multiculturalism (1987–1991); Judge of the Provincial Court of New Brunswick (1992–2015)	
John McLaughlin	United States	Speechwriter and advisor to President Richard Nixon (1971–1974)	
Fernando Arturo de Meriño	Dominican Republic	President of the Chamber of Deputies (1878–1883); President of the Dominican Republic (1880–1882)	
Smangaliso Mkhatshwa	South Africa	Member of Parliament (1994–1999); Deputy Minister of Education (1996–1999); Mayor of Tshwane (2000–2006)	
John Momis	Papua and New Guinea; Papua New Guinea	Member of the House of Assembly (1972–1975); Member of Parliament (1977–2005); Deputy Prime Minister (1985–1988); Governor of Bougainville (1999–2005); President of Bougainville (2010–2020)	
Laurent Monsengwo Pasinya	Zaire	President of the Sovereign National Conference (1991); President of the High Council of the Republic (1992–1994); Speaker of the Transitional Parliament (1994–1995)	
Romolo Murri	Italy	Member of the Chamber of Deputies (1909–1913)	
Gioan Baotixita Nguyễn Văn Riễn	Vietnam	Member of the National Assembly (2016–2021)	
Charles J. O'Byrne	United States	Secretary to the Governor of New York (2008)	
Robert Ogle	Canada	Member of Parliament (1979–1984)	
Charles Onen	Uganda	Member of Parliament (2021–present)	
Joseph Owusu-Agyeman	Ghana	Justice of the High Court (2020–present)	
Ignazio Panzavecchia	Malta	Member of the Council of Government (1891–1892); Member of the National Assembly (1919); Member of the Senate (1921–1925)	
Gabriel Richard	United States	Delegate to the House of Representatives (1823–1825)	
Ignaz Seipel	Austria	Minister of Public Works and Social Welfare (1918); Chancellor of Austria (1922–1924; 1926–1929); Minister of the Interior (1923–1924; 1926–1929); Minister of Foreign Affairs (1926–1929; 1930)	
Stanisław Staszic	Duchy of Warsaw; Poland	Minister of State of the Duchy of Warsaw (1809–1810); State Councillor of the Duchy of Warsaw (1810–1815); Ministry of Industry of Poland (1816–1824); Minister of State of Poland (1824–1826)	
Josip Juraj Strossmayer	Austria; Austria-Hungary	Member of the Imperial Council (1860); Grand Prefect of Virovitica County (1861–1862); Member of the Croatian Parliament (1861–1873)	
Luigi Sturzo	Italy	Vice-Mayor of Caltagirone (1905–1920); Member of the Senate (1952–1959)	
Romy Tiongco	Philippines	Mayor of Damulog (2007–2016)	
Jozef Tiso	Czechoslovakia; Slovakia	Minister of Health of Czechoslovakia (1927–1929); Minister of the Interior of Slovakia; Prime Minister of Slovakia (1938–1939); President of the Slovak Republic (1939–1945)	
Jean-Marie Tjibaou*	New Caledonia	Mayor of Hienghène (1977–1989); Vice-president of the Government Council (1982–1984)	
Beda Weber	Germany	Member of the Frankfurt National Assembly (1848–1849)	
Fulbert Youlou*	French Congo; Congo	Mayor of Brazzaville (1956); Prime Minister of the Republic of the Congo (1958–1959); Presidents of the Republic of the Congo (1960–1963)	

*laicized before taking office

== See also ==
- List of Christian clergy in politics
- Separation of church and state
- List of American politicians with religious occupations
