= Ernesto Mejía Sánchez =

Nicaraguan poet (1923-1985)

Ernesto Mejía Sánchez (Masaya, Nicaragua, 1923 – Mérida, Mexico, 1985) was a Nicaraguan author and poet. He took his doctoral degree in Madrid and, for several years was a professor at the National Autonomous University of Mexico. His first work was Romances y Corridos Nicaragüenses, a compilation of stories, which was published in Mexico in 1946.

He was a political adversary of Somoza. For that reason, he wrote a book of political poetry in 1950. This work launched his career as a poet. Together with Carlos Martinez Rivas, Pablo Antonio Cuadra y Ernesto Cardenal, he became part of what was called the "Generation of 1940".

In addition to being a poet, he was known as an expert on the work of Rubén Darío. In 1983, he edited an edition of Darío's complete stories and, in 1985, his complete poetry.

In 1971, he became Doctor Honoris Causa at the National Autonomous University of Nicaragua and, a year later, received the Xavier Villaurrutia Award. In 1980, he was appointed Nicaragua's ambassador to Spain and, afterwards, to Argentina. That same year, he was awarded the Alfonso Reyes International Prize.

== Selected works ==
- Ensalmos y Conjuros, Cuadernos Americanos (1947)
- La Carne Contigua (1948)
- El Retorno (1950)
- Contemplaciones Europeas, Ministry of Culture (1957)
- Estelas/Homenajes (1971)
- Recolección a Mediodía, Conaculta (2010) ISBN 968-298-320-7
