= Order of Rubén Darío =

Award in Nicaragua

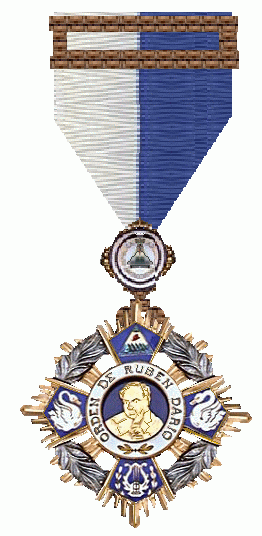

Awarded by Nicaragua
- Established: 16 February 1951
- Country: Nicaragua
- Awarded for: Art, literature, science and international relations.
- Status: Active
- Founder: Anastasio Somoza García
- Grades: Collar, Grand Cross with Gold Star, Grand Cross with Silver Star, Grand Officer, Commander, Officer, Knight

Precedence
- Next (higher): Order of San Juan of Nicaragua
- Next (lower): Order of Miguel Larreynage

The Order of Rubén Darío (Spanish: Orden de Rubén Darío) is a medal of honor in Nicaragua that was established on 16 February 1951. It is given to notable people who contributed to the world of art, literature, science and international relations.

== History ==
The Order of Rubén Darío was proposed by Anastasio Somoza García on 16 February 1951; named after Nicaraguan poet Rubén Darío and given to notable people who contributed in the field of art, literature, science and international relations.

== Recipients ==
- (Argentina) (France) Julio Cortázar, Argentinian-French writer.
- (Argentina) Gregorio Selser, Argentinian journalist and writer.
- (Cuba) Aleida March, Cuban politician.
- (East Germany) Margot Honecker, East German politician.
- (France) Florence Jaugey, French actress, movie director and producer.
- (Japan) Satō Eisaku, Japanese politician.
- (Francoist Spain) Gregorio Marañón Moya, Spanish politician.
- (Switzerland) (Guatemala) Raphael Girard, Swiss-Guatemalan ethnographer.
- (Peru) Mario Vargas Llosa, Peruvian writer
- (United States) Grace Kelly, American actress and the princess of Monaco.
- Rainier III, Prince of Monaco.
- (Nicaragua) Rosario Aguilar, Nicaraguan writer.
- (Nicaragua) Salvador Cardenal Argüello, Nicaraguan ethnomusicologist.
- (Nicaragua) Camerata Bach, Nicaraguan music group.
- (Nicaragua) June Beer, Afro-Nicaraguan poet, artist and writer.
- (Nicaragua) Ernesto Cardenal, Nicaraguan poet, politician and priest.
- (Nicaragua) Jorge Isaac Carvallo, Nicaraguan musician.
- (Nicaragua) Silvio Conrado, Nicaraguan economist.
- (Nicaragua) José Coronel Urtecho, Nicaraguan writer.
- (Nicaragua) María Gallo, Nicaraguan painter.
- (Nicaragua) Claudia Gordillo, Nicaraguan photographer.
- (Nicaragua) Rossana Lacayo, photographer, film director and screenwriter.
- (Nicaragua) Víctor M. Leiva, Nicaraguan composer.
- (Nicaragua) Irene López, Nicaraguan dancer and choreographer.
- (Nicaragua) Carlos Martínez Rivas, Nicaraguan poet.
- (Nicaragua) Carlos Mejía Godoy, Nicaraguan composer.
- (Nicaragua) Luis Enrique Mejía Godoy, Nicaraguan musician, composer and singer-songwriter.
- (Nicaragua) Ernesto Mejía Sánchez, Nicaraguan writer.
- (Nicaragua) Margarita Montealegre, Nicaraguan photojournalism.
- (Nicaragua) Armando Morales, Nicaraguan painter.
- (Nicaragua) Haydée Palacios Vivas, Nicaraguan dancer.
- (Nicaragua) Róger Pérez de la Rocha, Nicaraguan painter.
- (Nicaragua) Pierre Pierson, Nicaraguan writer.
- (Nicaragua) Guillermo Rothschuh Tablada, Nicaraguan writer and professor.
- (Nicaragua) Leoncio Sáenz, Nicaraguan painter.
- (Nicaragua) Mauricio Herdocia Sacasa, Nicaraguan lawyer and diplomat
- (Nicaragua) Fernando Silva Espinoza, Nicaraguan poet, novelist and painter
- (Nicaragua) Felipe Urrutia, Nicaraguan musician and composer.
- (Nicaragua) Camilo Zapata, Nicaraguan composer and singer-songwriter.
- (Paraguay) Raúl Sapena Pastor, Paraguayan lawyer and diplomat.
- (Puerto Rico) Yiye Ávila, Puerto Rican preacher and writer.
- (Spain) Manuel Fraga, Spanish politician.
- (Spain) José Utrera Molina, Spanish politician.
- (Spain) (Nicaragua) Pablo Martínez Téllez, Spanish composer.
- (Spain) Ramón Belauste, Spanish football player
- (United States) Jacqueline Cochran, American pilot and business executive.
- (United States) Francis Spellman, American catholic prelate.
- (United States) David Spencer, American evangelist.
- (Uruguay) Eduardo Galeano, Uruguayan writer.
- (Venezuela) TeleSUR, TV channel.
- (Japan) Tadatoshi Akiba, Japanese politician
- (Iran) Mahmoud Ahmadinejad, Iranian politician
- (Peru) Arturo Corcuera, Peruvian poet
- (Nicaragua) María Teresa Sánchez, Nicaraguan poet
- (Nicaragua) Ana Ilce Gómez Ortega, Nicaraguan poet journalist.
- (Mexico) (Spain) Marta Palau Bosch, Spanish-Mexican artist
- (Germany) Konrad Adenauer, German politician
- (Denmark) (Nicaragua) Edith Grøn, Danish-Nicaraguan sculptor
