= Claudia Gordillo =

Nicaraguan photographer (born 1954)

- Born: 11 February 1954 (age 72); Managua, Nicaragua
- Education: Central American University, Managua; Istituto Europeo di Design
- Occupation: Photographer
- Awards: Guggenheim Fellowship (1994) Order of Rubén Darío (2008)

Claudia Gordillo Castellón (born 11 February 1954) is a Nicaraguan photographer who specializes in documentary photography. Studying photography at the Istituto Europeo di Design, she worked as a war photographer for Sandinista newspaper Barricada. She held several exhibitions through the world, was a 1995 Guggenheim Fellow, and published several books.

== Biography ==
Gordillo was born on 11 February 1954 in Managua. She attended Central American University, Managua (1972-1975) as a sociology student, but abruptly moved to Europe to study design (albeit "without a clear plan"). She then learned about the Istituto Europeo di Design in Rome, but could not find any available spots outside of photography, where she enrolled instead; she then obtained a certificate from that institution in 1979.

Returning to Nicaragua in 1979, she took photographs of the damaged Old Cathedral of Managua, resulting in her 1982 debut solo exhibition at the Asociación Sandinista de Trabajadores de la Cultura. Carlos Martínez Rivas, a poet who was behind the exhibition's introduction, called these images an album of "photography of every day". From 1982 to 1984, she worked as a war photographer for Sandinista newspaper Barricada; Gordillo recalled on her experience with the Contra war: "I felt very good there, away from directives and with more freedom of movement. ... Since they were most interested in photographs of the war, I decided to move to the headquarters in the area, with permission from the regional army chief. This was my best assignment as a correspondent, and Barricada liked it.

Witnessing an economic downturn in the country, she shifted her work towards everyday life in the 1980s. She worked at the Center for Research and Documentation of the Atlantic Coast as a photographer from 1987 to 1992, where she worked on Indigenous and Afro-Nicaraguan communities, as well as a curator and archivist at the Institute of History of Nicaragua and Central America's photography collection. She published Nicaragua, una década de revolución in 1991. In 1994, she was awarded a Guggenheim Fellowship in Photography. By 1995, in addition to her native Managua, she had held exhibitions in places like New York, Boston, Stockholm, Gothenburg, and Vigo. She published another book, Estampas del Caribe nicaragüense: Portraits of the Nicaraguan Caribbean (with María José Alvarez), in the 2000s. In 2015, the Panama Museum of Contemporary Art held an exhibition of her black-and-white photographs.

The Eye of Photography called Gordillo "one of the rare classic documentary photographers in Nicaragua", drawing comparisons to Álvarez. Mónica Kupfer of ArtNexus said that Gordillo's photographs "can be considered neither demagogic nor strictly objective" because they accounted for the Nicaraguan values in addition to whatever political or historical stake was involved.
