= Orders, decorations, and medals of Nicaragua =

Awards and decorations of Nicaragua are medals and orders granted by a co-president of Nicaragua for meritorious achievements in national defense and state improvement. Awards may also be issued to military personnel of the Nicaraguan Armed Forces and worn in conjunction with awards and decorations of the Nicaraguan military.

== Civil ==
=== Orders ===
Sources:

- Order of Greytown
- Order of Rubén Darío
- Order of Miguel Larreynaga
- Order of Augusto Cesar Sandino
- Order of Jose de Marcoleta

=== Medals and Decorations ===
- Presidential Medal of Merit
- Medal of Distinction
- Cross of Valour
- Nicaraguan Medal of Merit
- Distinguished Service Cross

== Military and paramilitary ==
=== Army ===
==== Orders ====
- Order of the Nicaraguan Army
- Grand Cross for Military Merit

==== Medals ====
- Medal of Camilo Ortega Saavedra
- Medal Recognition of Valor
- Medal Recognition of Service
- Army Merit Medal
- Air Force Merit Medal
- Naval Merit Medal
- Medal of Honor for Merit in Military Health
- Medal of Honor for Merit in Intelligence Service
- Medal for Participation in International Mission
- Medal of Honor for Merit in Civil Military
- Medal of Honor for Merit in Friendship and Cooperation
- Medal of Honor for Merit in Service Accomplished
- Honor Medal for Military Merit "Soldier of the Fatherland"

==== Distinctions ====
- Distinction for Fulfillment of Duty
- Academic Distinction
- Sports Distinction
- Service Compliance Distinction

==== Commemorative medals ====
- Commemorative Medal for the 5th Anniversary of the Nicaraguan Army
- Commemorative Medal for the 10th Anniversary of the Nicaraguan Army
- Commemorative Medal for the 15th Anniversary of the Nicaraguan Army
- Commemorative Medal for the 20th Anniversary of the Nicaraguan Army
- Commemorative Medal for the 25th Anniversary of the Nicaraguan Army
- Commemorative Medal for the 30th Anniversary of the Nicaraguan Army

=== Ministry of Internal Affairs and Police ===
==== Orders ====
- National Police Order

==== Medals ====
- Medal of Merit "Comandante Guerrillero Marcos Somarriba"
- Medal for Participation in International Mission "Enrique Schmidt"
- Medal of Valor "Deputy Commissioner Juan Ramón Tórrez Espinoza"
- Medal of Merit "First Commissioner Christian Munguía Alvarado"
- Distinguished Service Medal "Regiment Commander Saúl Álvarez Ramírez"
- Medal of Merit "Commander Marco Somarriba"
- Police Friendship Medal
- 40th Anniversary of the National Police Medal
