= Haydée Palacios Vivas =

- Born: 21 November 1945; Masaya, Nicaragua
- Died: 23 September 2024 (aged 78)
- Occupation(s): Dancer, teacher, folklorist
- Awards: Order of Rubén Darío (1989)

Haydée Palacios Vivas (21 November 1945 – 23 September 2024) was a Nicaraguan dancer and folklorist, a promoter of folk dance. She was the founder of the Haydée Palacios Folkloric Ballet, with which she performed internationally.

She was a dance teacher at various educational institutions in her country, such as the Ramírez Goyena Institute, the Primero de Febrero School, and the National School of Commerce. She received national awards and distinctions for her cultural contributions and her work in preserving Nicaraguan folklore.

== Biography ==
Haydée Palacios Vivas was born in Masaya on 21 November 1945. Her mother was Haydée Vivas de Palacios, from whom she inherited her love of dance and teaching, and her father was Dagoberto Palacios Ruiz, a lawyer who opposed her pursuing an artistic career. From a young age, she participated in folk dances at festivals in Masaya.

In 1966 she graduated as a teacher, and that she year moved to Managua, where she began teaching first grade at the Rubén Darío School.

She went on to teach folk dance at the Ramírez Goyena Institute, the Colegio Primero de Febrero (now named for Rigoberto López Pérez) and the National School of Commerce (now named for Manuel Olivares).

In 1971, with the help of a scholarship, she studied folklore at the Universidad de San Carlos de Guatemala. Similarly, in 1979 she was able to study at the Inter-American Institute of Ethnomusicology and Folklore in Venezuela. In 1985, she studied at the National Museum of Anthropology in Mexico, and in 1987 at the Moscow State Academy of Choreography.

She succeeded in bringing folk dance to schools and having it included as a subject thanks to the project "Rescue, promotion and dissemination of folklore through secondary education", which she carried out with the support of the Ministry of Education in the 1980s.

== Haydée Palacios Folkloric Ballet ==
On 23 April 1970, she founded the Haydée Palacios Folkloric Ballet (Ballet Folklórico Haydée Palacios; formerly named Ruth Palacios) along with students from the Ramírez Goyena Institute.

This folk ballet company has performed nationally and internationally, giving shows in countries such as the United States, Spain, Canada, and Bulgaria.

Palacios considered her most significant work to be the rescue and staging of Los Ahuizotes de Masaya, a dance which she presented in various countries. In a 2015 interview, she stated:

Los Ahuizotes are made up of the same characters found in the streets of Masaya: the headless priest, La Llorona, the devil, La Quirina, and the goat. These are the characters that define the Ahuizote. Myths and legends are represented in the Ahuizote. This tradition has been gaining popularity in schools to counteract the influence of Halloween. There is a struggle to promote the true Ahuizote, which involves using the masks made by papier-mâché artisans. The people have added new characters, but these are invented by the people themselves, which is the point, since folklore is dynamic.

== Other groups ==
She founded the Haydée Palacios Children's Folkloric Ballet and created the first group of deaf dancers in Nicaragua, the Melania Morales National School Folkloric Ballet, which toured Honduras.

== Awards and recognition ==
For her cultural work with the Haydée Palacios Folkloric Ballet, she received the Order of Rubén Darío of Cultural Independence in 1989. In the United States, Miami presented her with the keys to the city in 1994 in recognition of her work abroad.

Palacios received a diploma of honor from the Santo Domingo de Guzmán festival committee in Managua for her contribution to the patron saint's festivities in August. She was also awarded a diploma of honor for her work directing the country's first deaf dance group.

In 1995, the Nicaraguan Institute of Culture awarded her a diploma of artistic excellence, and in 1996, the Rubén Darío National Theatre awarded her a medal of recognition.

For her participation in national dance festivals, Palacios won several awards, including Best Collective Performance for her dance Las Inditas de Canastos at the First National Folk Dance Festival, Best Choreographic Production and Best Performance at the Second National Folk Dance Festival, and an honorable mention for her work Las Pastorelas de Nicaragua at the Third National Dance Festival.

In 2015, she was named an Illustrious Citizen of the Capital of Nicaraguan Folklore in Masaya.

Palacios died on 23 September 2024.
