= The Gospel in Solentiname =

1970s biblical commentary compiled by Ernesto Cardenal

The Gospel in Solentiname (Spanish: El Evangelio en Solentiname) is a collection of commentary on the Christian gospels, written by Ernesto Cardenal. Originally published in four Spanish-language volumes between 1975 and 1977, English translations appeared in 1976, 1978, 1979, and 1982 and became available in a single volume in 2010. The commentary was made by a group of peasants in Solentiname, an archipelago in Nicaragua.

Cardenal held these discussions during the peak of the Cold War, when Nicaragua was ruled by the Somoza dictatorship. These discussions became a way to address issues such as class conflict and government suppression through gospel-centred discussions, analysis, and action. The Gospel in Solentiname contained radical readings of the gospels, stating that the God of the Bible is a God that sides with the poor, because God is love, and love can only exist with accordance with equality and justice.

== See also ==
- Christian socialism
- Liberation theology
- Nicaraguan Revolution
