= Irene López =

Irene López may refer to:

- Irene López (footballer)
- Irene López (dancer)
