= Ana Ilce Gómez Ortega =

Nicaraguan poet and journalist

Ana Ilce Gómez Ortega (28 October 1944 – 1 November 2017) was a Nicaraguan poet, journalist, and librarian. She is considered an important figure in contemporary Nicaraguan poetry.

== Early life and education ==
Gómez Ortega was born in 1944 in Masaya, Nicaragua, in the indigenous village of Monimbó. Her father was Sofonías Gómez, a teacher and painter of religious images who worked to improve literacy in their community, and her mother was Ana María Ortega Silva. She was the youngest of four children.

Gómez began writing at 8 or 9 years old. After graduating from high school in 1963, she studied journalism at the National Autonomous University of Nicaragua, then obtained a master's in library science at the University of Barcelona.

== Career ==
=== Poetry ===
Her poetry was first published in 1964, in the cultural supplement of the newspaper La Prensa. After continuing to publish in various periodicals, Gómez produced her first book, Las ceremonias del silencio, in 1975. It is considered a significant work of Nicaragua's "generation of the '70s" literary movement.

An opponent of the Somoza regime in the 1970s, though not a formal member of the Sandinista National Liberation Front, Gómez later joined the Asociación Sandinista de Trabajadores de la Cultura, an organization of Sandinista artists, in the 1980s. She traveled to other socialist countries on cultural exchanges during Daniel Ortega's first presidency.

In 1982, Gómez was the only woman included in Steven F. White's bilingual anthology Poets of Nicaragua. In 1989, she was awarded the "Orden de la Independencia Cultural Rubén Darío", which recognized important contributions by Nicaraguan artists and intellectuals.

She was further recognized for her poetry in 2002 by the Centro Nicaragüense de Escritores, and the following year her literary output was honored by the National Autonomous University of Nicaragua.

Her second collection, Poemas de lo humano cotidiano, was published in 2004. It won first prize in the Mariana Sansón National Contest of Poetry Written by Women, held by the Nicaraguan Association of Women Writers.

Gómez's poems are simple and intimate. She wrote about being a woman in Nicaraguan society and dealing with love, death, and emotional connection.

She became a member of the Academia Nicaragüense de la Lengua in 2006, only the second woman ever to join the literary organization.

=== Other work ===
Gómez also worked as a journalist and in public relations for various institutions. After obtaining her master's degree, she went on to run the library of the Central Bank, from 1990 to 1997, and direct the Armando Joya Guillén National Library.

== Personal life and legacy ==
Gómez had two children, Marco Antonio and Valeria, with the photographer Samuel Barreto. After their split, she remained single. Her experience as a single mother helped spur her to fight for women's rights in her country.

She died of cancer in 2017, aged 73, in Masaya, where she had retired to the same house where she was born. A book of her collected works, titled Poesía reunida, was released the following year.

== Selected works ==
- Las ceremonias del silencio. 1975
- Poemas de lo humano cotidiano. 2004
- Poesía reunida. 2018
