= Arturo Corcuera =

Peruvian poet

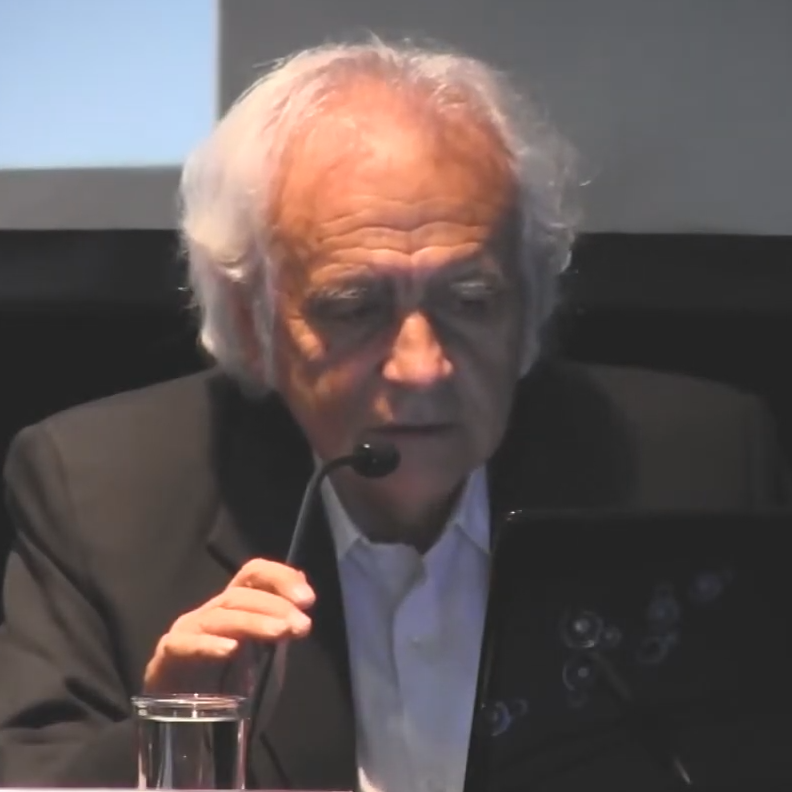
Daniel Arturo Corcuera Osores

Daniel Arturo Corcuera Osores (September 30, 1935 – August 21, 2017) was a Peruvian poet. Notable works include Noé delirante (1963), Primavera triunfante (1964), Las sirenas y las estaciones (1976), Los Amantes (1978) and Puente de los Suspiros (1982).

In 1972 he represented Peru in "La Bienal de Poesía de Knokke" in Belgium.

== Selected works ==
- Cantoral (1953)
- El grito del hombre (1957)
- Sombra del jardín (1961)
- Noé delirante (1963)
- Primavera triunfante (1964)
- Las sirenas y las estaciones (1976)
- Los Amantes (1978)
- Puente de los Suspiros (1982).

== Award and nomination ==
- (Nicaragua) : Order of Ruben Darío
