= Asilia Guillén =

Nicaraguan folk artist (1887–1964)

Asilia Guillén (1887–1964) was a Nicaraguan folk artist, specializing in embroidery and painting.

Guillén was born in Granada, Nicaragua, into a patrician family. She received an education typical for a young woman of her station, learning embroidery and music among other subjects. She worked in embroidery for much of her artistic life, in line with the tradition of the bordados granadinos produced by the city of her birth. She took up painting at the age of sixty-five; once discovered by poet Enrique Fernández Morales, she took classes with Rodrigo Peñalba, at the time director of the School of Fine Arts in Managua. Early in her career she showed work at the São Paulo Art Biennial. In 1957 she was one of the six artists included in the group exhibition 6 Artists of Nicaragua organized by the Organization of American States; soon thereafter she was taken up by José Gómez-Sicre, who ensured that her work gained exposure in Latin America and further afield. Her paintings were shown at the Mexican Inter-American Bienal and in exhibits in Knokke and Baden-Baden, and in 1962 she exhibited eighteen works in Washington, D.C. in her first solo show; she visited under the auspices of the United States Department of State, and gained further international recognition as a result. Gómez Sicre commissioned another work from her in 1964, titled The Founders of the Americas Meet on the Islands of Lake Granada and designed for inclusion in the Central American and Panama Pavilion at the 1964 World's Fair. For a time Guillén lived at the Solentiname art colony, becoming acquainted with its founder, Ernesto Cardenal.

Stylistically, the embroideries Guillén produced at the beginning of her career grew more elaborate as she developed, moving from traditional floral motifs to more complicated landscapes and historical scenes. Her paintings, which depict similar scenes, are known for their intricate detail. She drew much of her inspiration from the history and vistas of her native city. Two of her paintings, both oils on canvas, are owned by the Art Museum of the Americas; they are Rafaela Herrera Defends the Castle from Pirates of 1962 and Heroes and Artists Come to the Pan American Union To Be Consecrated of the same year.
