= Nindirí, Masaya =

Nindirí
- Municipality
- Location in Nicaragua
- Coordinates: 12°00′17″N 86°07′10″W
- Country: Nicaragua
- Department: Masaya department

Area
  - Municipality: 55 sq mi (143 km^{2})

Population (2022 estimate)
  - Municipality: 61,816
  - Density: 1,120/sq mi (432/km^{2})
  - Urban: 29,566
- Climate: Aw

Nindirí is a town and a municipality in the Masaya department of Nicaragua.

In 2022 the population was 61,816 in the municipality, and 29,566 in the town. Nindirí is located 3.5 km from downtown Masaya and form the southeastern part of Managua Metropolitan Area.
