= Gregorio Selser =

Gregorio Selser (July 2, 1922 – August 27, 1991) was an Argentine journalist and historian. He published an extensive bibliography critical of globalization, imperialism, and covert operations implemented by the CIA in Latin America, in particular.

Selser was born in Buenos Aires. He earned a degree in journalism at the University of Buenos Aires, and in 1955, was hired by the Uruguayan weekly journal, Marcha, as its chief Argentine correspondent. That year, he published his first book, a biography on Nicaraguan nationalist Augusto Sandino. He returned to Buenos Aires in 1956, and joined the editorial board of La Prensa. Selser joined the IPS news agency in 1964.

He and his family left Argentina following the March 1976 coup, and was hired as researcher by the Latin American Institute of Latin American Studies (ILET). His three daughters, Irene, Gabriela and Claudia Selser, each became journalists in their own right.

Selser was recognized by critics as "a Latin Americanist committed to freedom and justice." His books covered a wide array of contentious Latin American issues and events, including the 1903 Separation of Panama from Colombia, the installation of the Somoza dynasty in Nicaragua, the 1954 Guatemalan coup d'état, the Alliance for Progress, the 1964 overthrow of Dominican Republic President Juan Bosch and the subsequent U.S. occupation, the 1973 coup in Chile, psy-ops carried out in Latin America, the 1980 Cocaine Coup in Bolivia, the Salvadoran Civil War, the 1989 Operation Just Cause, and other topics.

Selser would be afflicted with a terminal illness, and he committed suicide in Mexico City in 1991.

== Works ==
- Sandino, general de hombres libres. Buenos Aires: Pueblos Unidos de América, 1955.
- Situación político-social de América Latina (informe de la FUA. Buenos Aires: Perrot, 1957.
- El pequeño ejército loco: Operación México-Nicaragua. Editorial Triángulo, Buenos Aires: 1958.
- Sandino, general de hombres libres (versión definitiva ampliada en dos tomos), prólogo de Miguel Angel Asturias. Editorial Triángulo, Buenos Aires: 1959.
- El Guatemalazo. Buenos Aires: Iguazú, 1961.
- Diplomacia, garrote y dólares en América Latina. Buenos Aires: Palestra, 1962.
- El rapto de Panamá: de cómo los Estados Unidos inventaron un país y se apropiaron de un canal. Buenos Aires: Alcándara, 1964.
- Alianza para el Progreso, la mal nacida. Buenos Aires: Iguazú, 1964.
- Argentina a precio de costo: el gobierno de Frondizi. Buenos Aires: Iguazú, 1965.
- ¡Aquí, Santo Domingo! La tercera guerra sucia. Buenos Aires: Palestra, 1966.
- Espionaje en América: el Pentágono y las técnicas sociológicas. Buenos Aires: Iguazú, 1966.
- De Dulles a Raborn: la CIA, métodos, logros y pifias del espionaje. Buenos Aires: Ediciones de Política Americana, 1967.
- Punta del Este contra Sierra Maestra. Buenos Aires: Hernández Editor, 1968.
- La CIA en Bolivia. Buenos Aires: Hernández Editor, 1970.
- Los cuatro viajes de Cristóbal Rockefeller (con su informe al presidente Nixon). Buenos Aires: Hernández Editor, 1971.
- De la CECLA a la MECLA, o la diplomacia panamericana de la zanahoria. Buenos Aires: Carlos Samonta Editor, 1972.
- Una empresa multinacional: la ITT en Estados Unidos y en Chile. Buenos Aires: Granica, 1974.
- Chile para recordar. Buenos Aires: Ediciones Crisis, 1974.
- Los marines: intervenciones norteamericanas en América Latina. Buenos Aires: Ediciones Crisis, 1974.
- El Pentágono y la política exterior estadounidense (coautoría con Carlos Díaz). Buenos Aires: Ediciones Crisis, 1975.
- De cómo Nixinger desestabilizó a Chile. Buenos Aires: Hernández Editor, 1975.
- Trampas de la información y neocolonialismo (con Rafael Roncagliolo). México DF: ILET (Instituto Latinoamericano de Estudios Transnacionales), 1979.
- La batalla de Nicaragua (en colaboración con Ernesto Cardenal, Gabriel García Márquez y Daniel Waksman Schinka), México DF: Bruguera Mexicana, 1980.
- Apuntes sobre Nicaragua. CEESTEM, Editorial Nueva Imagen, México DF, 1981.
- Bolivia, el cuartelazo de los cocadólares. Mex-Sur Editorial, México D. F, 1982.
- Reagan, de El Salvador a las Malvinas. Mex-Sur Editorial, 1982.
- Sandino, en coautoría con Cedric Belfrage, 1982.
- Honduras, república alquilada (tomo I). México DF: Mex-Sur, 1983.
- Nicaragua, de Walker a Somoza. México DF: Mex-Sur, 1984.
- Informe Kissinger contra Centroamérica. México DF: El Día en Libros, 1984.
- Cinco años de agresiones estadunidenses contra Centroamérica y el Caribe, 1979-1984. Guadalajara (México): Editorial de la Universidad de Guadalajara, 1984.
- Salvador Allende y Estados Unidos: la CIA y el golpe militar de 1973. Puebla (México): Universidad Autónoma de Puebla (Archivo Salvador Allende), 1987.
- El «Documento de Santa Fe», Reagan y los derechos humanos. México DF: Alpa Corral, 1988.
- Panamá: autodeterminación versus intervención de Estados Unidos (con Pedro Buskovic C., Diego Prieto y Carlos Fazio). México DF: CIDE, 1988.
- Panamá: érase un país a un canal pegado. México DF: Universidad Obrera de México, 1989.
- La violación de los derechos humanos en los Estados Unidos. México DF: Editorial Mestiza, 1989.
- Los Documentos de Santa Fe I y II. Universidad Obrera de México, México DF, 1990. Traducción de Gregorio Selser y Stephen A. Hasam.
- Los días del presidente Allende. México DF: Universidad Autónoma Metropolitana-Azcapotzalco (Archivo Salvador Allende), 1991.

== See also ==
- Latin America–United States relations
- Nicaraguan Revolution
