= Róger Pérez de la Rocha =

Róger Pérez de la Rocha (Spanish pronunciation: [ˈroxeɾ ˈpeɾes ðe la ˈrotʃa]; born 27 March 1949 in Managua, Nicaragua) is a Nicaraguan painter and portrait artist.

== Early life ==
Róger Pérez de la Rocha’s parents were Teresa Pérez Rocha and Luis Franco Cortés. He was baptized in the Roman Catholic Church as Róger Antonio. As Pérez himself explains, his name, following the usual practice in Spanish-speaking countries, should actually be Róger Antonio Franco Pérez, but since his father was married to another woman at the time of his birth, he assumed both his mother’s surnames and even added the “de la” to make it sound better.

In 1957, Róger was sent to live with his grandmother, Josefa Rocha, when his mother’s epilepsy made it impossible for her to care for her son. Josefa Rocha’s alcoholic husband, Gonzalo Pérez Estrada, was dead, leaving her widowed and needing to work hard for a living, as she had eight children to care for – seven of her own and Róger.

Róger did not see much of his father when he was a boy, and in 1961, Luis Franco Cortés found himself in Cuba, obliged as he then was to spend time in exile.

== Career ==
Pérez entered the National Academy of Fine Arts in Managua in 1964. He continued his studies at the Real Academia de Bellas Artes de San Fernando in Madrid in 1968. He was director of the Upper School of Fine Arts at the Autonomous University of Nicaragua in León in 1971. That same year, he joined the Praxis Group, a group of artists centred at the gallery of the same name. It was active from 1963 to 1972.

He was a founding member of the Asociación Sandinista de Trabajadores de la Cultura (ASTC; “Sandinista Association of Workers in Culture”) and director of the Unión Nacional de Bellas Artes (“National Union of the Fine Arts”) once the Sandinistas came to power in the Nicaraguan Revolution in 1979. Pérez furthermore completed studies in metal engraving at the Academia de San Carlos in Mexico City.

From the 1970s and, especially, through the 1980s, working from photographs, Pérez painted a whole series of portraits of Nicaragua’s national hero, Augusto César Sandino as well as his generals and soldiers, creating a whole Sandinista iconography. A portrait of Sandino can be seen in the background of the video under External links.

He has exhibited with other artists in Panama, Cuba, Brazil, the United States, Peru, Spain, France, Bulgaria, the Soviet Union, Mexico and Central America, and alone in Spain, Nicaragua, Costa Rica and Mexico.

Róger Pérez de la Rocha also had a hand in setting up the artists' colony in the Solentiname Islands in Lake Nicaragua.

In 1990 he was honoured with the Orden de la Independencia Cultural Rubén Darío, conferred by the Government of Nicaragua. A retrospective of his work took place at the Rubén Darío National Theatre in 1994.

== Personal life ==
Róger Pérez de la Rocha fought a thirty-year battle with alcoholism, which he finally overcame, but not before it had destroyed three marriages. He believes that his work saved him, although he also describes this as yet another addiction.

He has been married five times. His wives have been Marta Luz Padilla, Ángela Saballos, Nelba Cecilia Blandón, Rosa María Sánchez and Luvy Rappaccioli with whom he has a daughter, Luisa Margarita del Carmen. He also has a son from his first marriage, Gonzalo Pérez, who is an architect. All Pérez's wives have been Nicaraguan.
