= Raúl Sapena Pastor =

Paraguayan lawyer, diplomat, foreign affairs minister (1908–1989)

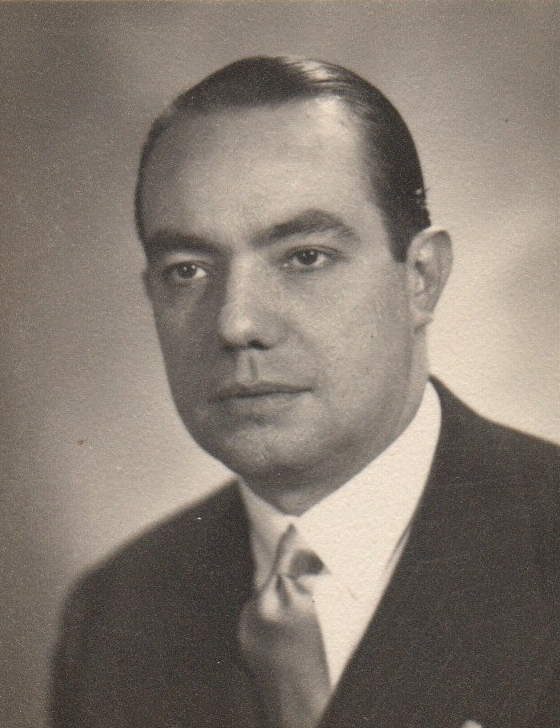

Minister of the Paraguayan Supreme Court of Justice
- In office 1938–1940

Minister of Foreign Affairs of Paraguay
- In office 1956–1976
- Preceded by: Hipólito Sánchez Quell
- Succeeded by: Alberto Nogues

Senator of Paraguay
- In office 1976–1989

Personal details
- Born: 9 October 1908 Asunción, Paraguay
- Died: 15 June 1989 (aged 80) Asunción, Paraguay
- Spouse: Juana Brugada Montero
- Children: Graciela Josefina; Raúl Ricardo; Rubén Adolfo; Gloria Susana
- Parent(s): Francisco Sapena y Pastor; Josephine Guérìn Mertens

Military service
- Branch/service: Paraguayan Army
- Rank: 1st Lieutenant
- Battles/wars: Chaco War

Raul Sapena Pastor Guérin (9 October 1908 – 15 June 1989) was a Paraguayan lawyer, diplomat, professor and judge who served as foreign minister of the Republic of Paraguay from 1956 to 1976.

== Family ==
He was the youngest of 9 children. His parents were Francisco Sapena y Pastor, a Spanish immigrant, and Josephine Guérìn Mertens, a French immigrant. Near the end of the Chaco War, he married Juana Brugada Montero, with whom he lived all his life and had 4 children: Graciela Josefina, Raúl Ricardo, Rubén Adolfo and Gloria Susana.

== Early years ==
He began his studies at the Normal School of Asunción. In 1924 he completed his secondary studies obtaining a bachelor's degree in Sciences and Letters, along with a medal for being the best graduate of his class at the Colegio de San José de Asunción.

He continued his studies at the Universidad Nacional de Asunción, obtaining the title of Doctor of Law and Social Sciences; during his studies he was also president of the Law Students Center. Later on his life he would also obtain an honorary degree from the University of Rio de Janeiro in Brazil.

A few years after his graduation, the Chaco War began, and Raúl volunteered for service, becoming an officer in the Paraguayan Army with the rank of lieutenant.

He first worked as a teacher at the Goethe, International and National schools in Asunción. At the same time he taught Political Economy, Private International Law, Consular Legislation and Public International Law at the Faculty of Law and Social Sciences of the Universidad Nacional de Asunción. At the War College, he was a professor of Public International Law.

He was president of the Banco de la República del Paraguay (today split into the Central Bank of Paraguay and the Banco Nacional de Fomento), and Ambassador in Argentina and Brazil. He was named Minister of Foreign Affairs when he was 48, and he held the position for a record 20 years; afterwards he resigned and assumed a seat in the Senate. He was elected Senator of the Republic of Paraguay for three terms: 1973–78, 1978–83, 1983–89. He held his seat in the Senate of the Republic until his death.

It also has important international law books that have been used in various universities throughout Latin America.

== Judicial functions ==
Throughout his long career Raúl also held judicial positions, over time being a district judge in Paraguay's Criminal, Civil and Commercial courts, State attorney general, president of the Civil Court of Appeals and Commerce, and finally a minister of the Supreme Court of Justice of Paraguay between 1938 and 1940.

== Ministry of Foreign Affairs ==
His work at the Paraguayan Chancellery can be divided into 2 sections. One prior to the arrival of Gral. Alfredo Stroessner to the presidency of Paraguay, and the other during his presidency in Paraguay, and the installation of the dictatorship. At that point, he resigned from office.

== Honors and awards ==
- Argentina: Grand Cross of the Order of the Liberator General San Martín
- Bolivia: Grand Cross of the Order of the Condor of the Andes
- Brazil:
  - Grand Cross of the Order of the Southern Cross
  - Marshal Hermes Medal
  - Marshal Caetano de Faria Medal
- Chile: Grand Cross of the Order of Merit
- Colombia: Grand Cross of the Order of Boyacá
- Ecuador: Grand Cross of the National Order of Merit
- Egypt: Grand Cross of the Order of the Republic
- Italy: Knight Grand Cross of the Order of Merit
- Japan: Grand Cordon of the Order of the Rising Sun
- Malta: Grand Cross of the Order pro Merito Melitensi
- Nicaragua: Grand Cross of the Order of Rubén Darío
- Netherlands: Grand Officer of the Order of Orange-Nassau
- Panama:
  - Grand Cross of the Order of Vasco Núñez de Balboa
  - Grand-Cross of the Order of Manuel Amador Guerrero
- Peru: Grand Cross of the Order of the Sun
- Republic of China:
  - Grand Cordon of the Order of Brilliant Star
  - Grand Cordon of the Order of Propitious Clouds
- Spain: Knight Grand Cross of the Order of Isabella the Catholic
- United Kingdom: Knight Commander of the Order of the British Empire
- Vatican: Knight Grand Cross of the Order of Pope Pius IX
- Venezuela: Grand Cordon of the Order of the Liberator

== Death ==
He died in Asunción, Paraguay, on 15 June 1989. The then President of the Republic, Andrés Rodríguez Pedotti and the Congress of the Republic decided that his burial was to be carried out with the military honors corresponding a Division General, for the high services rendered to the homeland.
