= Silvio Conrado =

Nicaraguan economist (1945–2018)

Silvio Enrique Conrado Gómez (18 February 1945 – 17 February 2018) was the Nicaraguan director of the Central American Bank for Economic Integration (BCIE) serving from 2002 until his death. He was an economist. In 2007, he was a member of the Special Commission for the Promotion of Investments (Pro-Nicaragua). He was widely regarded as the key individual in the management of the financial resources and the macroeconomic stability of Nicaragua. Since 2002, he was also a director of the Central Bank of Nicaragua, and served a term as its president from 2006 to 2010.

Conrado held a doctorate in economics, and was a member of the Sandinista National Liberation Front. He was the primary economic advisor to Daniel Ortega. Among the many projects that Conrado helped facilitate for Nicaragua was the recent US$76 million Hospital Fernando Vélez Paiz in Managua, which just opened in January 2018, and a US$238 million project to renovate the roads in Nicaragua. Earlier projects included building infrastruce for electricity generation, water supply, sewage management, and waste management and decontamination, as well as financial and insurance measures, and various developments in farming, livestock, forestry and fishing.

== Criminal charges ==
In June 2003, Conrado was indicted on the charges of statutory rape, corruption of minors and procuring. The judge dismissed the charges in November 2003.

In 2008 in the Cenis case, Conrado was among those in the government charged with economic crimes including fraud and influence peddling. In 2011 the charges were dropped.

== Personal life and death ==
Conrado was born on 18 February 1945 to Eduardo Conrado Vado and Maria Gomez, the youngest of three brothers. He was married to Miriam Karim de Conrado and they had three children. Conrado died of cardiac arrest on a Saturday morning, 17 February 2018. On 18 February the government held a memorial service for Conrado, chaired by Nicaraguan president Daniel Ortega. At the service Ortega posthumously awarded Conrado the Orden de la Independencia Cultural Rubén Darío.
