= Robert Pring-Mill =

Robert Duguid Forrest Pring-Mill, FBA (11 September 1924 – 6 October 2005) was a British Hispanist. He was University Lecturer in Spanish at the University of Oxford and fellow of St Catherine's College, Oxford from 1965 to 1988.

After serving in the Black Watch in India and Burma during the Second World War, rising to the rank of captain, Pring-Mill read Modern Languages at New College, Oxford. He was appointed University Lecturer in Spanish at the University of Oxford in 1952, was elected fellow of St Catherine's College, Oxford in 1965, and held college lectureships at New College, Oxford and Exeter College, Oxford.

Pring-Mill's academic interests were varied, and included Catalan literature, Spanish Golden Age literature, and Latin American literature. He was an important promoter of Pablo Neruda.

Pring-Mill was elected a corresponding member of the Institut d'Estudis Catalans in 1966, a fellow of the British Academy in 1988, and a corresponding member of the Reial Acadèmia de Bones Lletres de Barcelona in 2002.
