= Nicaraguan dance =

This is a compilation of traditional dances from Nicaragua.

== El Güegüense ==
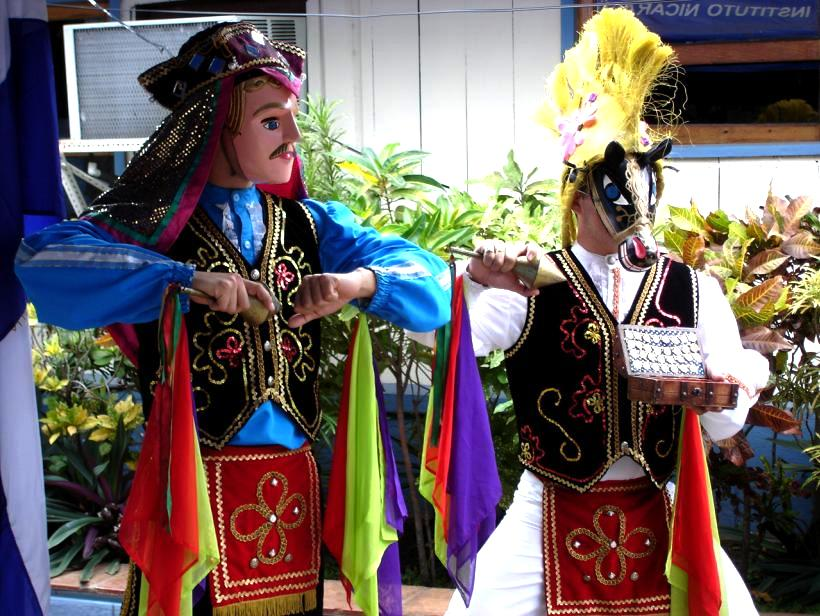
El Güegüense with its traditional masks.

El Güegüense (also known as Macho Ratón) is a satirical drama and was the first literary work of post-Colombian Nicaragua. It is regarded as one of Latin America's most distinctive colonial-era expressions and as Nicaragua's signature folkloric masterpiece combining music, dance and theater.

El Güegüense is performed during the feasts of Saint Sebastian in Diriamba and Saint Anne in Niquinohomo.

The play of El Güegüense dates back to the colonial era. Although the exact date is unknown, some estimate it to be from the end of 17th century or the beginning of the 18th century. It's considered the ultimate expression of the characteristics of the Nicaraguan people, their language, customs and idiosyncrasies, reflecting the social structures of the time.

== El Viejo y La Vieja ==
El Viejo y La Vieja, literary The Old Man and the Old Lady, is a traditional dance from Diriamba, Carazo.

The Old Man wears a long sleeve shirt with a jacket and trousers, a traditional palm hat with colored ribbons and a mask. He carries a cane or walking stick as a support and dances very slowly and gracefully, according to his age.

The Old Lady wears a colorful dress and a palm hat decorated with flowers. Her physical attributes are overly exaggerated, with big breasts and buttocks. She also wears a mask that represents a beautiful Spanish woman, moving quickly with provocative movements towards the Old Man, showing all her elegance.

The musical instruments used in this dance are the traditional marimba de arco, the guitar and the guitarrilla (a small guitar similar to a mandolin). A special rhythm was created exclusively for this dance that has the same name of El Viejo y La Vieja.

== Palo de Mayo ==
Palo de Mayo (Maypole; or ¡Mayo Ya!) is a type of Afro-Caribbean dance with sensual movements that forms part of the culture of several communities in the RAAS region in Nicaragua, as well as Belize, the Bay Islands of Honduras and Bocas del Toro in Panama.

It is also the name given to the month long May Day festival celebrated on the Caribbean coast. Both the festival and dance are an Afro-Nicaraguan tradition which originated in Bluefields, Nicaragua in the 17th century.

Historically, combos played bongo drums made of tree trunks, washboard bass and even the jawbone of a donkey for percussion. Later calypso, soa or soul calypso and other influences were incorporated into the music.

== Toro Huaco ==
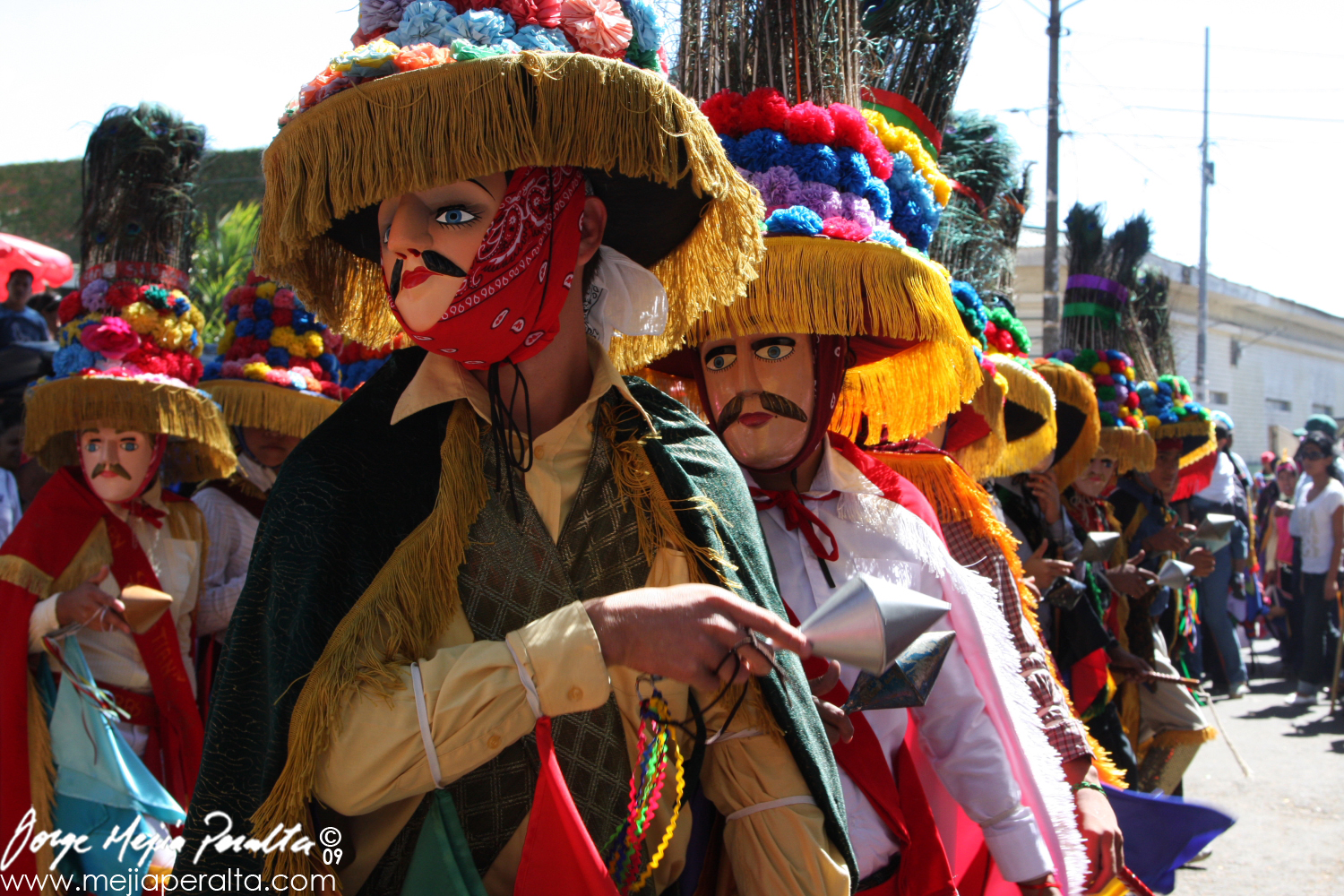
Toro Huaco dancers in Diriamba, Carazo.

Toro Huaco is a traditional Nicaraguan dance that is part of the Native American and Spanish cultural heritage of the country. The term Toro Huaco means carnival parade of ragged men, or rather, men disguised in rags. It should not be confused with Toro Guaco, a traditional dance from the city of León.

The Toro Huaco originated in Diriamba, Carazo, and has been preserved for over 100 years. It's usually performed during the festivities of Saint Sebastian, patron saint of the city of Diriamba. For this dance the locals dress up with very colourful costumes and the face is covered with a wooden mask placed over a scarf that is used to cover the edge of the mask.

The ruddy hand-painted masks, resemble the appearance of a handsome Spanish character. Some masks have mustaches or beards, others are hairless. The dancers cover their heads with a hat decorated with peacock feathers, laces and other accessories. They also carry a small whip called tajona.

The music is performed by a single musician playing a wooden whistle (tatil) and a small drum (tacún). The music has nine different sones of melody.

== See also ==
- Culture of Nicaragua
- Music of Nicaragua
