= Beda Weber =

German professor and author (1798–1859)

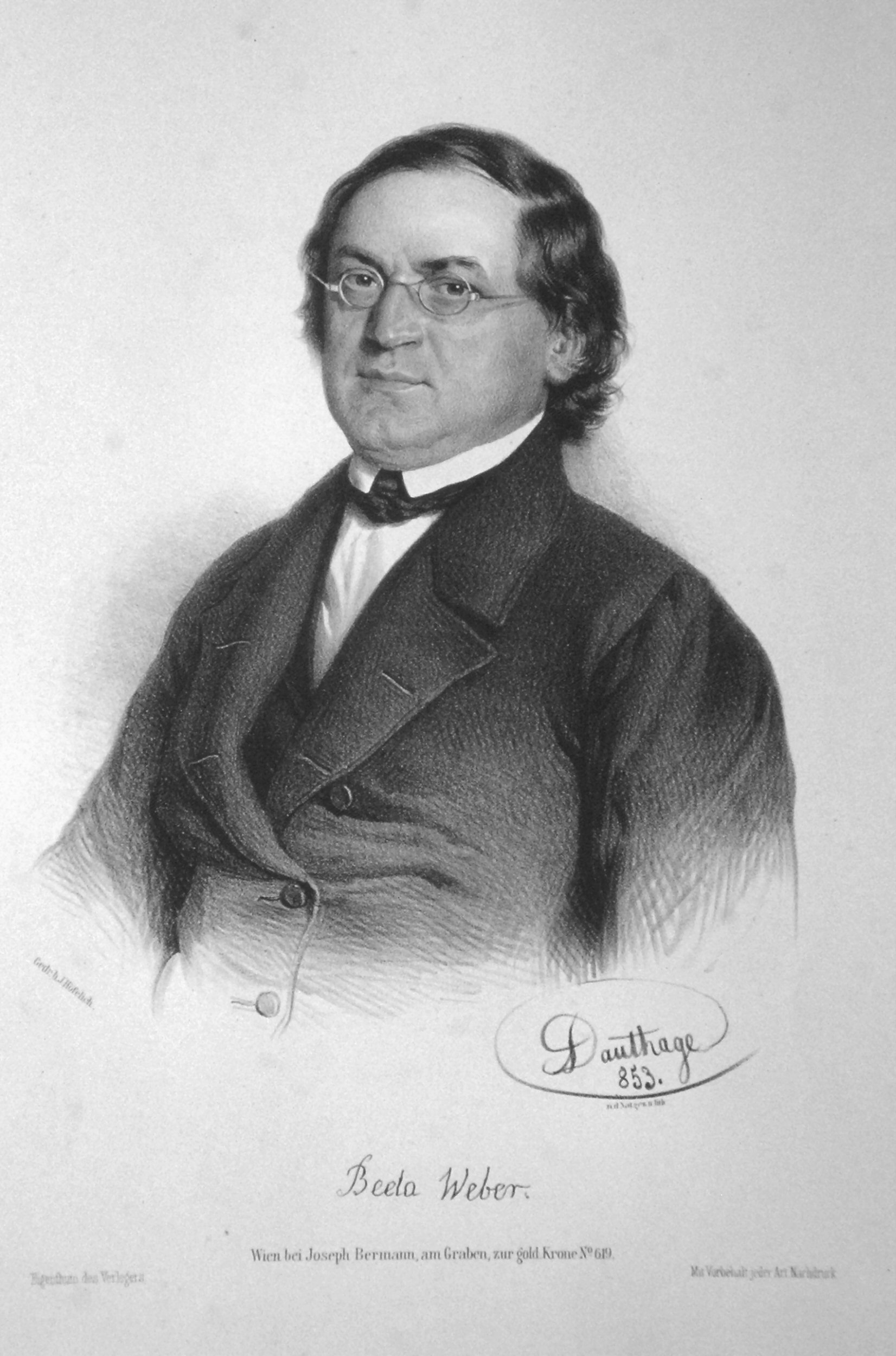
Beda Weber in 1853.

Johann Chrysanth "Beda" Weber (26 October 1798 – 28 February 1859) was a German Benedictine professor, author, and member of the Frankfurt Parliament.

== Biography ==
Weber was born at Lienz in the county of Tyrol. He completed coursework at Bozen in four years, and studied philosophy at Innsbruck for two years. His father wished him to learn a trade as well as the ordinary work of a peasant, and thus Weber became a shoemaker. He then entered the Benedictine Abbey of Marienberg in Vinschgau, near Mals, taking the name of Beda. In the autumn of 1821, he began to study theology at the University of Innsbruck, and on the abolition of the theological faculty there, he continued his course at Brixen.

Weber was ordained in 1824, and went for a short time to the episcopal seminary at Trento to prepare himself for pastoral work; in 1825 he returned to his monastery. After a short time spent in the pastorate, he began to teach at the high school at Meran, where he remained for twenty years. He received calls to professorships from the University of Innsbruck, from the Benedictine Lyceum at Augsburg, and from the crown-prince of Hohenzollern-Sigmaringen, but remained at Meran until he was called away by the political events of 1848. His parliamentary labours attracted attention.

When the town priest of Frankfurt died, Weber succeeded him. His bishop made him canon of the diocese of Limburg, episcopal commissary, spiritual councillor, and member of the diocesan court at Frankfurt and of the school commission, as well as inspector of the cathedral school.

Weber died of apoplexy on 28 February 1859 at Frankfurt am Main. A fresco was painted in his honor in the Imperial Cathedral, the restoration of which he initiated.

== Literary works ==
Weber's chief works are:

- several poems for a poetical annual, the "Alpenblumen"
- a translation of Chrysostom's "On the Priesthood" (1833)
- studies upon Oswald von Wolkenstein, which led also to the discovery of a manuscript containing "Titurel" and the "Nibelungenlied"
- "Das Land Tirol" (1837–38)
- "Meran und seine Umgebung" (1845)
- "Die Stadt Bozen und ihre Umgebung" (1849)
- "Das Tal Passeier und seine Bewohner" (1851), containing an account of Andreas Hofer and the Tyrolean Rebellion
- "Erbhuldigung in Tirol" (1838)
- "Tirol und die Reformation in historischen Bildern und Fragmenten" (1841)
- "Lieder aus Tirol" (1842), a selection of his poems
- "Blüten heiliger Liebe und Andacht. Aus den Schriften der Giovanna Maria vom Kreuze"
- "Giovanna della Croce und ihre Zeit"
- "Die Gedichte Oswalds von Wolkenstein" (1847)
- "Oswald von Wolkenstein und Friedrich mit der leeren Tasche" (1850).
- "Predigten and Tiroler Volk"

Weber founded a weekly paper, "Das Frankfurter katholische Kirchenblatt" (1853), which two years later became the Sunday supplement of a large Catholic paper, the "Deutschland". He issued a selection of his contributions to this paper under the title of "Cartons aus dem deutschen Kirchenleben" (1858); five years earlier he had collected his contributions to the "Augsburger Postzeitung" and to the "Historisch-politische Blätter" in book form under the title "Charakterbilder".
