= Irene López (dancer) =

Nicaraguan dancer and folklorist (1945–2025)

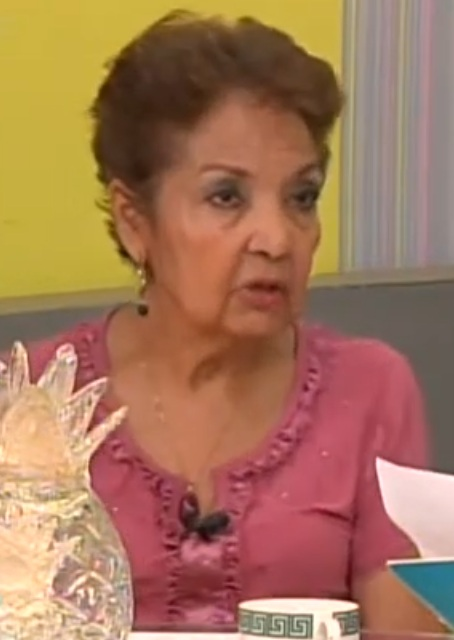
- López in 2017
- Born: Irene del Socorro López Pérez; 5 April 1945; Managua, Nicaragua
- Died: 12 August 2025 (aged 80)
- Occupations: Dancer, choreographer and folklorist

Irene del Socorro López Pérez (5 April 1945 – 12 August 2025) was a Nicaraguan dancer, choreographer and folklorist. She was a recipient of the Order of Rubén Darío (1990).

López died on 12 August 2025, at the age of 80.
