= Charles Onen =

Ugandan Catholic priest and politician

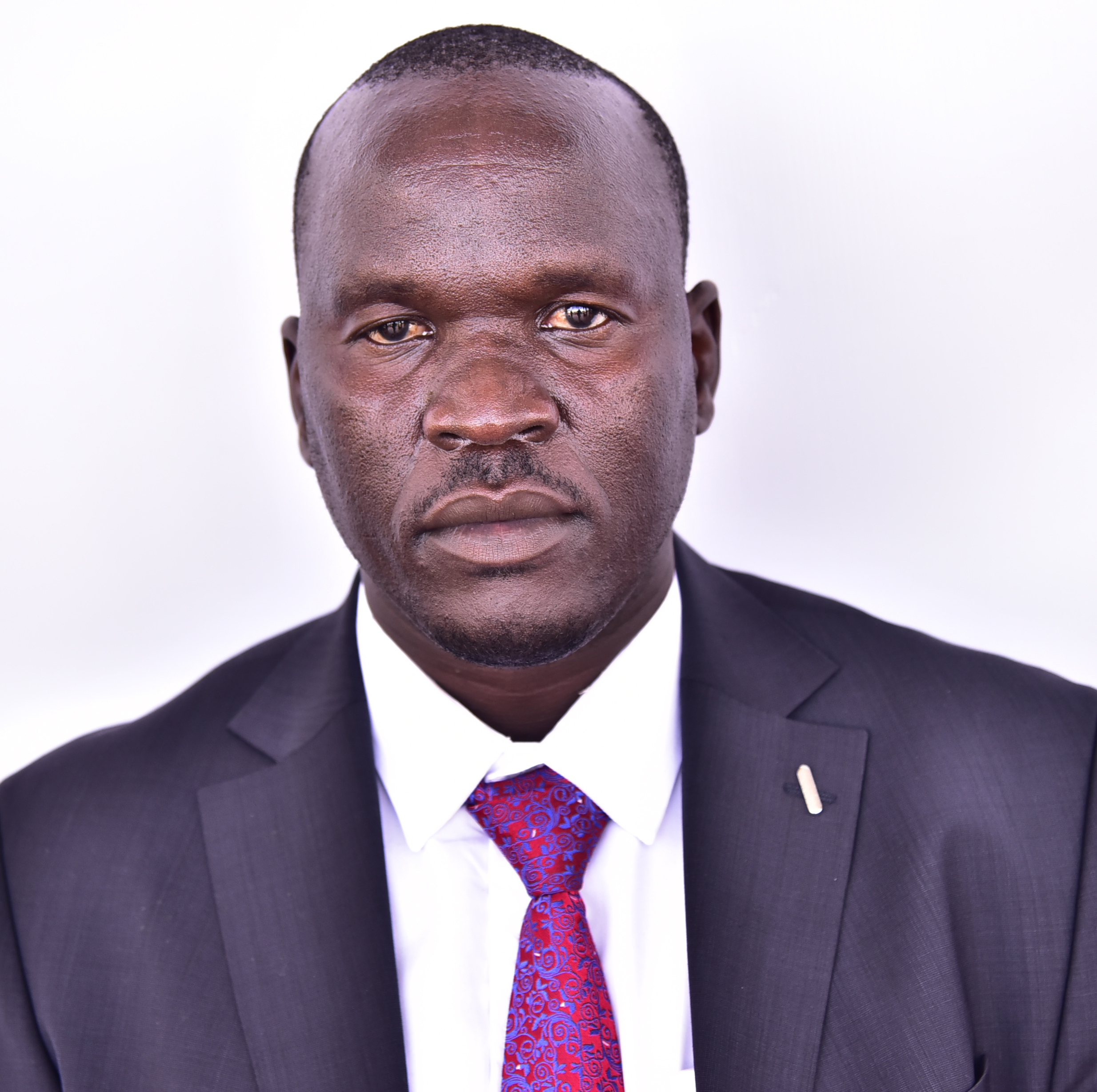
Onen Charles

Charles Onen is a Ugandan Catholic priest, politician and member of the parliament from Gulu East constituency. He was elected to the parliament as an independent candidate. In parliament he serves on the Rules committee.

== Career ==
Onen is a Catholic priest who served as the second curate of Holy Rosary Parish Catholic Church. He was a priest for eight years before joining active politics. The Bishop of his Gulu Diocese John Baptist Odama issued him two warning letters to desist from active politics in accordance with the Canon Law but Onen reportedly ignored warnings. The Bishop then issued a decree of suspension ‘a divinis’ as prescribed by Canon Law 285. Onen went into politics as an independent candidate and secured a nomination to run for the Gulu East constituency on 15 October 2020. Onen campaign focused on unity and improvement of living standard. He won the election after beating his challengers including the incumbent MP.
