= Fernando Cardenal =

Nicaraguan Jesuit theologian (1934–2016)

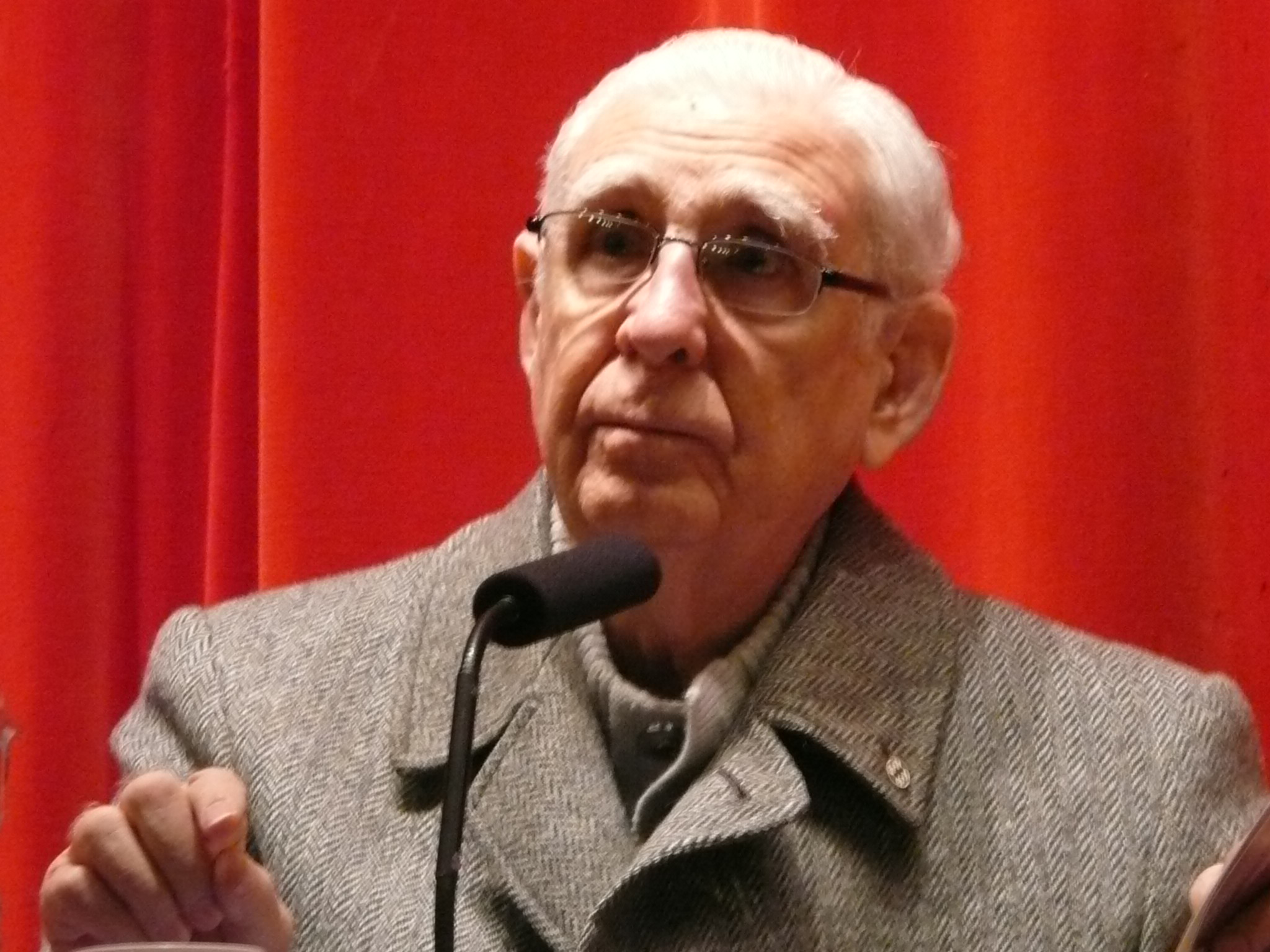
Fernando Cardenal

Fernando Cardenal Martínez (26 January 1934 – 20 February 2016) was a Nicaraguan Jesuit and liberation theologian.

== Family ==
Fernando Cardenal was born into a wealthy and influential family in Granada, Nicaragua, as the fifth son of Rodolfo Cardenal and Esmeralda Martinez. One of his brothers is Ernesto Cardenal, a Nicaraguan Catholic priest, poet and politician. He is also a first cousin of the poet Pablo Antonio Cuadra.

== Nicaraguan Revolution ==
Born in Granada, Nicaragua, he served as Minister of Education from 1984 to 1990, during the Sandinista era. His brother Ernesto Cardenal served as Minister of Culture from 1979 to 1987.

In September 1979, Cardenal traveled to Cuba to study the success of the Cuban literacy campaign, which Cardenal described as a source of admiration and enthusiasm for Cardenal. Following the visit, Cardenal invited Cuban literacy experts to Nicaragua to provide Sandinista literacy campaign organizers with support and technical assistance.

Because of his ties to the leftist Sandinistas and liberation theology, he was forced to leave the Society of Jesus, and, together with his brother Ernesto. On February 4, 1984 he had his priesthood suspended directly by Pope John Paul II.

In an open letter published in 1984 he wrote: "I cannot conceive of a God that would ask me to abandon my commitment to the people […] From my point of view, and from my personal experience, it is possible to live […] simultaneously (in) fidelity to the church as a Jesuit and as a priest, and also devote myself to the service of the poor in Nicaragua from within the Sandinista revolution." Cardenal left political office in 1990, and was subsequently reinstated into the Jesuit order in 1997.

In 1980, Cardenal led the Nicaraguan Literacy Campaign, a Sandinista effort that succeeded in teaching basic literacy to more than half a million people with the help of 60,000 young volunteers.

== Later life ==
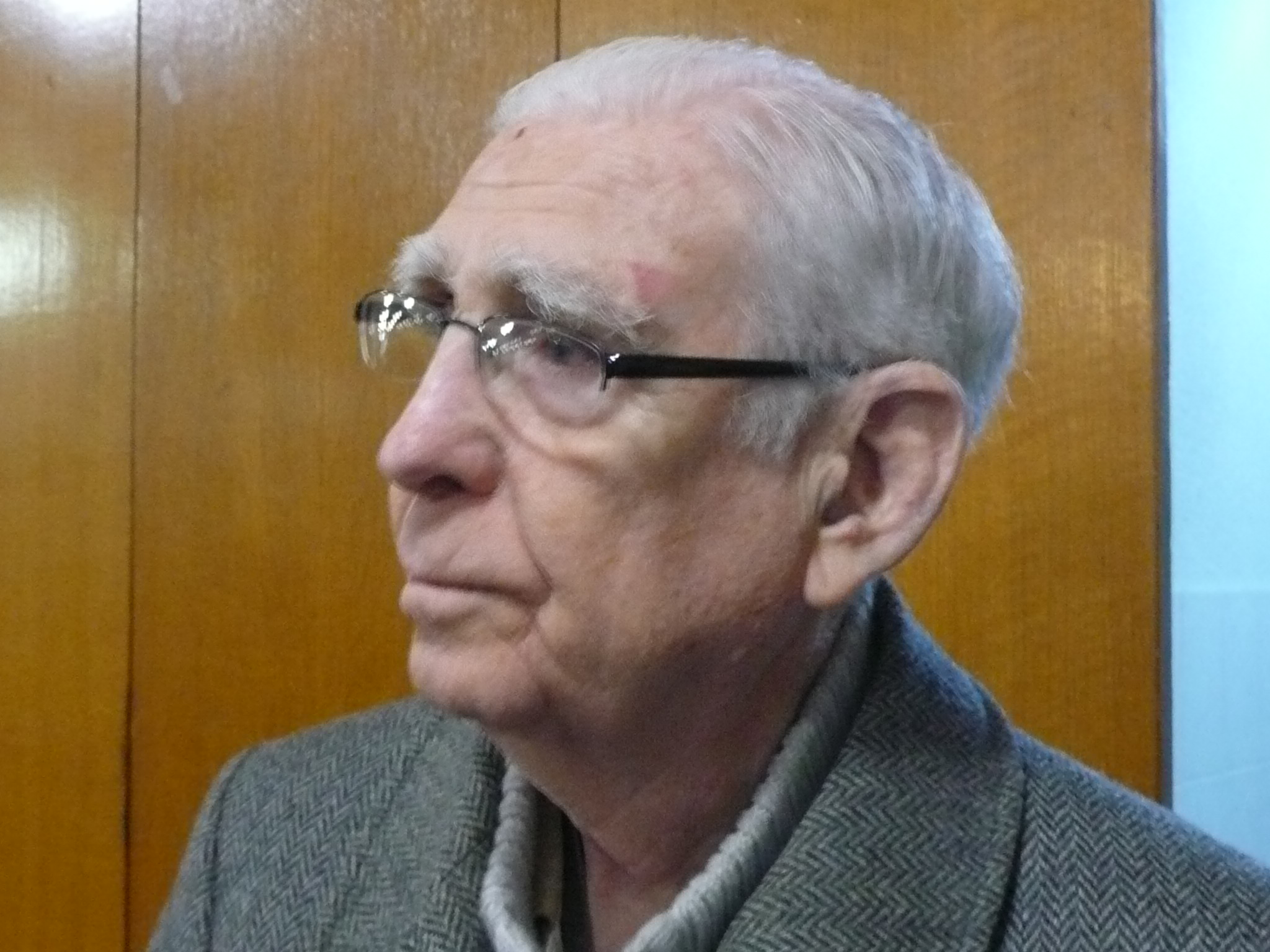
Fernando Cardenal

Fernando Cardenal was a director at the Fe y Alegría organization in Managua, Nicaragua. He was readmitted as a Jesuit and resumed activities as a priest in 1997, after four years had passed since he renounced his membership in the Sandinista National Liberation Front (the Sandinistas). Cardenal helped to provide education for the poor in Nicaragua.

Cardenal made several visits to Jesuit universities in the United States, including the University of Detroit Mercy in 2013, and the John Carroll University in 2014. He talked there about his commitment to help the poor and his experience as a Jesuit priest and liberation theologian during the Nicaraguan Revolution. He gave several interviews to discuss his involvement in the Nicaraguan Revolution as a minister of education, his commitment to the poor, and the state of education in Nicaragua which links to his involvement in Fe y Alegría. He gave an interview to an undergraduate student at Georgetown University in 2014.

== Death ==
Cardenal died in Managua on February 20, 2016. His funeral was held February 21, 2016 at the Jesuit-run Central American University in Managua.
