= Ernesto Cardenal =

Nicaraguan Catholic priest, poet, and politician (1925-2020)

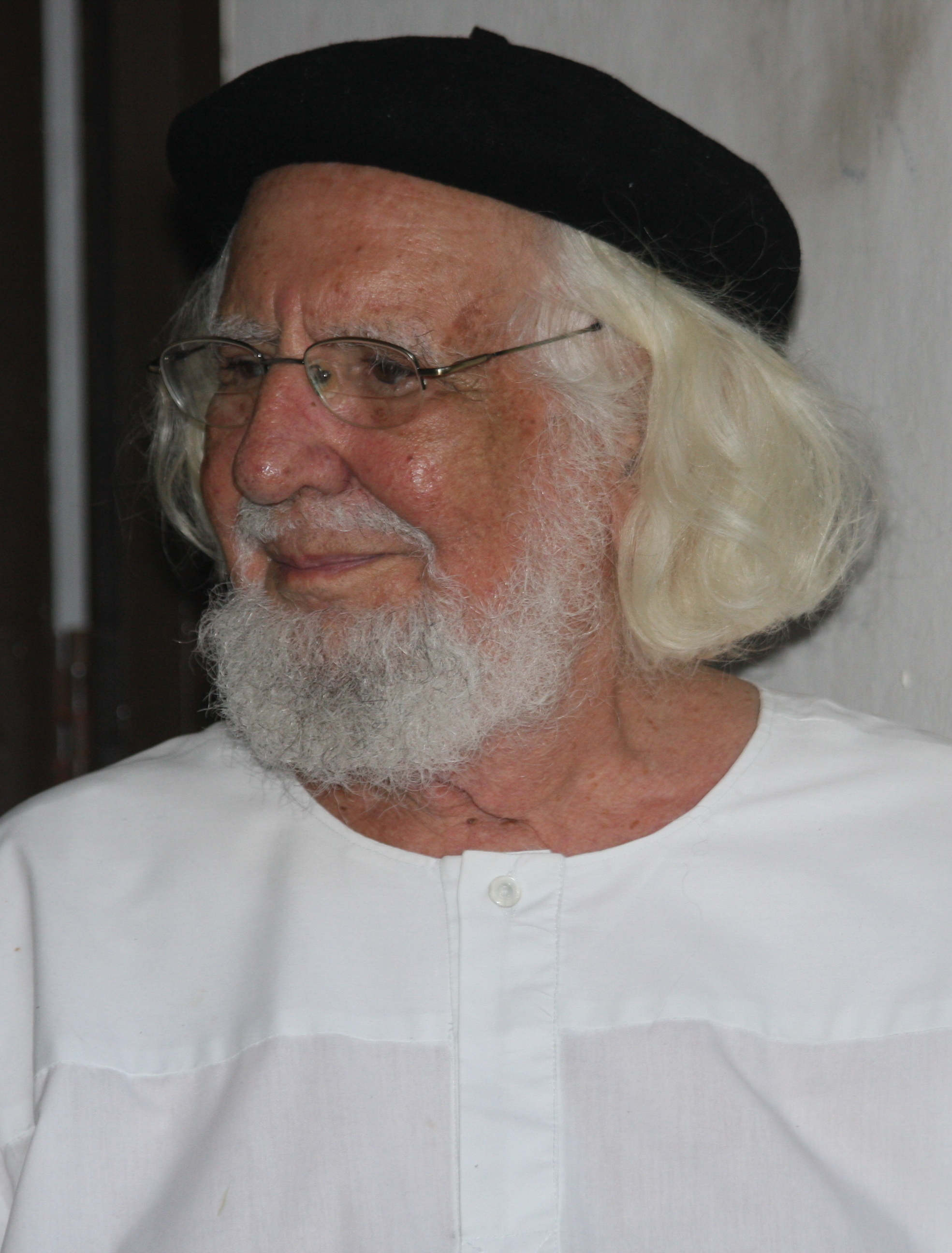
- Cardenal in 2008
- Born: Ernesto Cardenal Martínez; 20 January 1925; Granada, Nicaragua
- Died: 1 March 2020 (aged 95); Managua, Nicaragua
- Occupations: Poet; liberation theologian
- Years active: 1954–2020
- Known for: Nicaraguan cultural figure
- Notable work: The Gospel in Solentiname

Ernesto Cardenal Martínez (20 January 1925 – 1 March 2020) was a Nicaraguan Catholic priest, revolutionary, poet, and politician. He was a liberation theologian and the founder of the primitivist art community in the Solentiname Islands, where he lived for more than ten years (1965–1977). A former member of the Nicaraguan Sandinistas, he was Nicaragua's minister of culture from 1979 to 1987. He was prohibited from administering the sacraments in 1984 by Pope John Paul II, but rehabilitated by Pope Francis in 2019.

== Early life ==
Cardenal was born into an upper-class family in Granada, Nicaragua. He studied at Colegio Centro América in Nicaragua. One of his brothers was fellow priest Fernando Cardenal. A first cousin of the poet Pablo Antonio Cuadra, Cardenal studied literature in Managua and then from 1942 to 1946 in Mexico and from 1947 to 1949 in New York City. In 1949 and 1950, he traveled through Italy, Spain and Switzerland.

In July 1950, he returned to Nicaragua, where he participated in the 1954 April Revolution against Anastasio Somoza García's regime. The coup d'état failed and ended with the deaths of many of his associates. After a deep mystical experience that Cardenal had on June 2, 1956, in 1957 he entered the Trappist Monastery of Gethsemani (Kentucky, United States), joining another poet-priest, Thomas Merton, who was the master of novices; but in 1959, he left to study theology in Cuernavaca, Mexico.

== Priesthood ==
Cardenal was ordained a Catholic priest in 1965 in Granada. He went to the Solentiname Islands, where he founded a Christian, almost-monastic, mainly-peasant community, which eventually led to the founding of the artists' colony. The colony engaged with painting as well as sculpture and was visited many times by artists and writers of the region such as Willarson Brandt, Julio Cortázar, Asilia Guillén, and Aedes Margarita. It was there that the famous book El Evangelio en Solentiname (The Gospel in Solentiname) was written. Cardenal collaborated closely with the leftist Frente Sandinista de Liberación Nacional (Sandinista National Liberation Front, or FSLN) in working to overthrow Anastasio Somoza Debayle's regime.

== Nicaraguan Revolution ==
Many members of the Solentiname community engaged in the revolutionary process through guerrilla warfare that the FSLN had developed to strike at the regime. The year 1977 was crucial to Cardenal's community, when Somoza's National Guard, as a result of an attack to the headquarters stationed in the city of San Carlos a few kilometres from the community, raided Solentiname and burned it to the ground. Cardenal fled to Costa Rica.

Cardenal was a believer in Christian communism saying "Christ led me to Marx...for me, the four Gospels are all equally Communist. I’m a Marxist who believes in God, follows Christ and is a revolutionary for his Kingdom". He later said "The Bible is full of revolutions. The prophets are people with a message of revolution. Jesus of Nazareth takes the revolutionary message of the prophets. And we also will continue trying to change the world and make revolution. Those revolutions failed, but others will come".

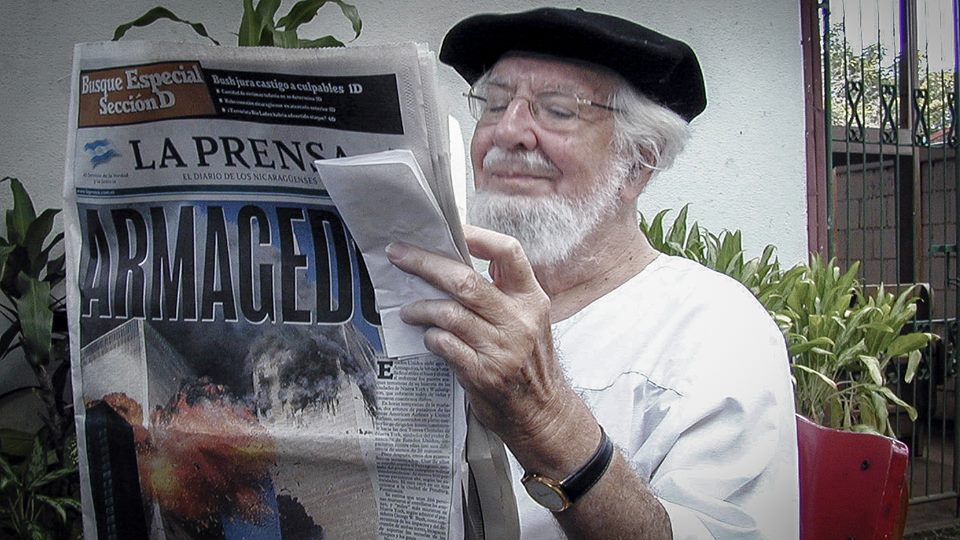
Cardenal in Managua in 2001

On 19 July 1979, immediately after the Liberation of Managua, he was named Minister of Culture by the new Sandinista government. He campaigned for a "revolution without vengeance." His brother Fernando Cardenal, also a Catholic priest (in the Jesuit order), was appointed Minister of Education. When Pope John Paul II visited Nicaragua in 1983, he openly scolded Ernesto Cardenal, who knelt before him on the Managua airport runway, for resisting his order to resign from the government, and admonished him: "Usted tiene que arreglar sus asuntos con la Iglesia" ("You must fix your affairs with the Church"). On 4 February 1984 Pope John Paul II suspended Cardenal a divinis because of Cardenal's refusal to leave his political office. This suspension remained in effect until it was lifted by Pope Francis in 2019. Cardenal remained Minister of Culture until 1987, when his ministry was closed for economic reasons.

== Later career ==
Cardenal left the FSLN in 1994, protesting the authoritarian direction of the party under Daniel Ortega, calling it a "robbery of the people and dictatorship not a revolutionary movement" when he left the government. He was a member of the Movimiento de Renovación Sandinista (Sandinista Renovation Movement, or MRS) that participated in the 2006 Nicaraguan general election. Days before the election, Cardenal explained his decision: "I think more desirable an authentic capitalism, as Montealegre's [Eduardo Montealegre, the presidential candidate for Nicaraguan Liberal Alliance] would be, than a false Revolution."

He was also a member of the board of advisers of the Latin American television station teleSUR.

Cardenal was a polemical figure in Nicaragua's literary and cultural history. He has been described as "the most important poet right now in Latin America" politically and poetically. He was a vocal representative for Nicaragua and a key to understanding the contemporary literary and cultural life of Nicaragua. He participated in the Stock Exchange of Visions project in 2007. During a short visit to India, he made a profound impression on a group of writers called the Hungry Generation.

Cardenal's tour of the United States in 2011 to promote his newest work stirred up some controversy, as with the American Society for the Defense of Tradition, Family and Property that protested his appearances at Catholic schools such as Xavier University in Cincinnati, Ohio, because of his Marxist ideology.

On 18 February 2019, Archbishop Waldemar Sommertag, the Vatican nuncio in Nicaragua, announced that Pope Francis had ended Cardenal's suspension and that Cardenal was "granted with benevolence the absolution of all canonical censures". His return to ministry was also confirmed by Managua Auxiliary Bishop Silvio Báez, who stated “I visited my friend priest, Father Ernesto Cardenal, in the hospital, with whom I could talk for a few minutes. After praying for him, I knelt in his bed and asked for his blessing as a priest of the Catholic Church, to which he agreed joyfully. Thank you, Ernesto! ”

On 1 March 2020, Cardenal died due to complications from ongoing heart and kidney problems. His funeral was held in the Managua Cathedral on March 3, 2020, and was disrupted by at least 100 pro-Ortega protestors who shouted "viva Daniel" and "traitor" at his Nicaraguan flag-draped casket. To avoid further harassment, Cardenal's burial was held in secret. At his request, Cardenal's remains were cremated and then buried in the community he founded on the Solentiname Islands.

== Poetry ==
Earlier works were focused on life and love; however, some works like "Zero Hour" had a direct correlation to his Marxist political ideas, being tied to the assassination of guerrilla leader Augusto César Sandino. Cardenal's poetry was also heavily influenced by his unique Catholic ideology, mainly liberation theology. Some of his later works are heavily influenced by his understanding of science and evolution, though they are still in dialogue with his earlier Marxist and Catholic beliefs. Cardenal sums up his later material in a PBS NewsHour interview:

In the first place, one matures, and can write about things one couldn't before. One couldn't get poetry out of this theme or this situation. And later, you can do it because you have more technical ability to do it. Now I can do easily things that were impossible for me to do when I was younger. That also happens to painters, I guess, and to all artists and creators. Even politicians mature and become, perhaps, more astute or more cunning.

== Honours ==
- 1980: Peace Prize of the German Book Trade
- November 1990: Peace Abbey Courage of Conscience Award
- 2005: Nominated for the Nobel Prize in Literature
- 2005: Order of Rubén Darío
- 2009: Ibero-American Poetry Prize Pablo Neruda
- 2009: GLOBArt Award in the monastery church in Pernegg
- 2010: Austrian Cross of Honour for Science and Art, 1st class
- 2012: Queen Sofia Prize for Ibero-American Poetry
- 2018: Mario Benedetti International Award

== Bibliography ==
=== Books in English ===
- The Psalms of Struggle and Liberation, (Translator, Emile G. McAnany), Herder and Herder, 1971.
- To Live is to Love, Herder and Herder, 1972.
- Homage to the American Indians, Johns Hopkins University Press (Baltimore, MD), 1973.
- Apocalypse and Other Poems, (Editor and author of introduction, Robert Pring-Mill), New Directions (New York, NY), 1974.
- In Cuba, New Directions (New York, NY), 1974.
- Zero Hour and Other Documentary Poems, (Editor, Donald Walsh), New Directions (New York, NY), 1980.
- With Walker in Nicaragua and Other Early Poems: 1949-1954, (Translator, Jonathan Cohen), Wesleyan (Middleton, CT), 1984.
- From Nicaragua, with Love: Poems (1979–1986), (Translator, Jonathan Cohen), City Lights (San Francisco, CA), 1987.
- Golden UFOs: The Indian Poems: Los ovnis de oro: Poemas indios, Indiana University Press (Bloomington, IN), 1992.
- The Doubtful Strait/El estrecho dudoso, Indiana University Press (Bloomington, IN), 1995.
- Flights of Victory/Vuelos de victoria, Curbstone Books (Willmantic, CT), 1995.
- Cosmic Canticle, Curbstone Books (Willmantic, CT), 2002.
- Love: A Glimpse of Eternity, (Translator, Dinah Livingston), Paraclete Press (MA), 2006.
- Pluriverse: New and Selected Poems, (Editor, Jonathan Cohen), New Directions, 2009.
- The Gospel in Solentiname, Orbis Books (Maryknoll, NY), 2010.
- The Origin of Species and Other Poems, (Translator, John Lyons), Texas Tech University Press (Lubbock, TX), 2011.

=== Poetry ===
- Gethsemani Ky
- Hora 0 ("Zero Hour")
- Epigramas ("Epigrams")
- Oración Por Marilyn Monroe ("Prayer for Marilyn Monroe")
- El estrecho dudoso ("The Doubtful Strait")
- Los ovnis de oro ("Golden UFOs")
- Homenaje a los indios americanos ("Homage to the American Indian")
- Salmos ("Psalms")
- Oráculo sobre Managua ("Oracle on Managua")
- Con Walker en Nicaragua ("With Walker in Nicaragua and Other Early Poems")
- Cántico Cósmico ("Cosmic Canticle")
- El telescopio en la noche oscura ("Telescope in the Dark Night")
- Vuelos de la Victoria ("Flights of Victory)
- Pluriverse: New and Selected Poems
- El Origen de las Especies y otros poemas ("The Origin of the Species")
- Un Museo en Kampuchea ("A Museum in Kampuchea")
