= Masaya =

- Municipality
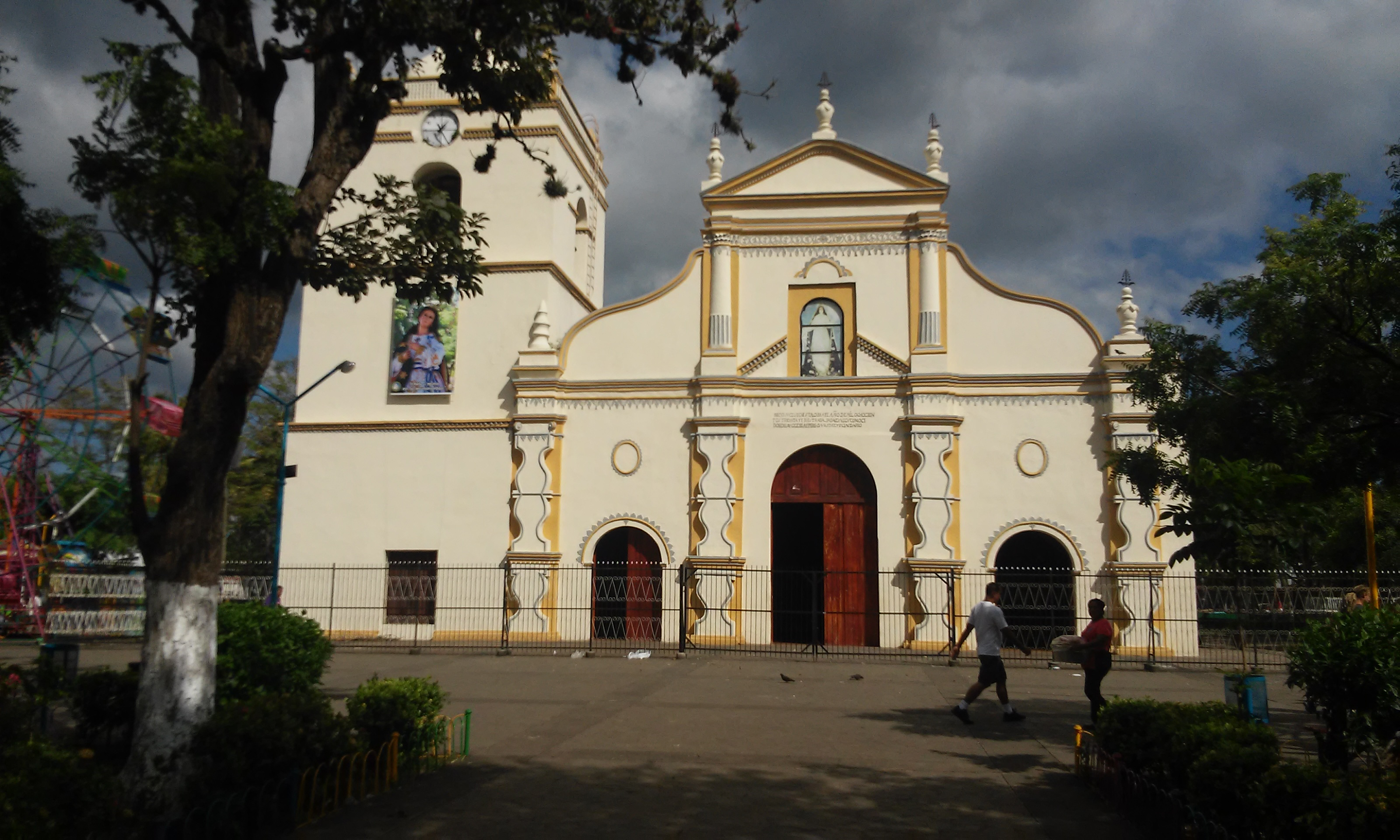
- La Asunción church in the Central Park of Masaya

- Flag Seal

- Location in Nicaragua
- Coordinates: 11°58′N 86°06′W
- Country: Nicaragua
- Department: Masaya Department

Government
  - Mayor: Janina Noguera

Area
  - Municipality: 57 sq mi (147 km^{2})

Population (2022 estimate)
  - Municipality: 191,574
  - Density: 3,380/sq mi (1,300/km^{2})
  - Urban: 138,657 (4th Nicaragua)

Masaya (Spanish pronunciation: [maˈsaʝa]) is the capital city of Masaya Department in Nicaragua. It is situated approximately 14 km west of Granada and 31 km southeast of Managua. It is located just east of the Masaya Volcano, an active volcano from which the city takes its name. With an estimated population of 138,657 (2022), it is Nicaragua's fourth most populous city, and is culturally known as the City of Flowers.

== History ==
It is believed that the Nicaraos were the first people to dwell in the land of Masaya (the Chorotegas had also inhabited these areas). There is evidence of their settlements in small towns like Nindiri, Niquinohomo and Monimbó from before the Spanish Conquest. One of the city's principle neighborhoods is Monimbó (which in Spanish means "close to the water") and is located very close to the lagoon. There is documented evidence that in the 6th century, Monimbó had a population of about 150 tribes.

Pedrarias Davila initiated the conquest of what is now Masaya in 1524 and created the first encomiendas. Since Masaya is located on the main road from Granada to León, as well as the road to Panama, it soon developed into an appropriate resting place for travelers. Due to its nice climate and fertile soil, many people were drawn to settling in the city, thus creating the colonial city of Masaya.

On 24 March 1819, the King, Ferdinand VII of Spain, granted Masaya the title of "Very Noble and Loyal Village Faithful to San Fernando of Masaya" that you can still read on the city's coat of arms today. Additionally, the city's coat of arms says, "Long Live the Heart of Mary". On 2 September 1839, Masaya was officially declared a city.

Of all the different indigenous settlements, only Monimbó has conserved its ethnic identity over time.

On 19 September 1912, during the Nicaraguan civil war of 1912, Nicaraguan rebel forces opened fire on American Marines and sailors passing through the city on their way to Granada. This became known as the Battle of Masaya.

== Production ==
Masaya is located centrally to a large agricultural production region in Nicaragua. Much of the production from the departments of Masaya and Carazo and the surrounding areas is shipped through Masaya on its way north, towards Managua and Leon. Masaya is also a notable industrial center, producing footwear and clothing. Other industries in the city include the processing of fiber and the manufacture of cigars, leather products, soap, and starch. Many of the communities surrounding Masaya produce hardwood and wicker furniture, and there is a neighborhood in Masaya near the lake dedicated to the production of hammocks.

== Attractions ==
Masaya is known as "The Cradle of Nicaraguan Folklore" and is the very heart of Nicaraguan handicrafts. The main market in Masaya is located next to the central bus station. The market is divided into sections, with each section serving a different need. Aside from unique Nicaraguan products such as hand woven hammocks, embroidered blouses, wood carvings, and hemp weaving the market is very diverse. An entire section of the market is dedicated to selling electronic devices and clothing, while another area is reserved for raw meat. Everything is available in the market from hardware and beauty supplies to produce from the surrounding area.

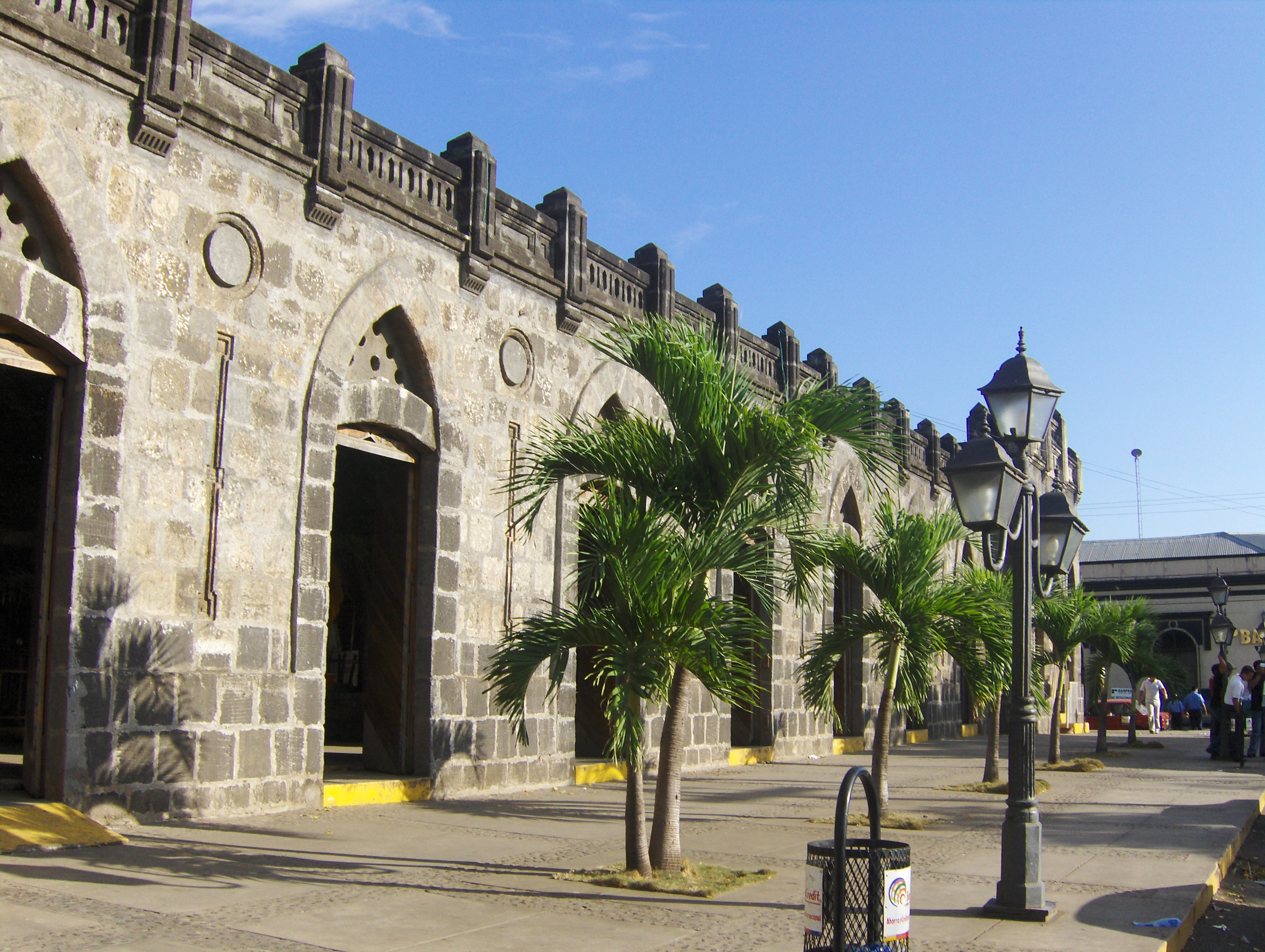
Masaya Market Castle

The Mercardo de Artesanias (Craft Market) is located inside what used to be the "mercado viejo" (old market), a 1900s structure that is located near the center of the city and a couple of blocks away from the general population market. This market has been revitalized and set as a tourist spot, where crafts from Masaya and other areas of Nicaragua can be found. In addition, every Thursday night there is a Noche de Verbena or Night of Revelry, where folkloric dances are presented. Masaya is noted for the annual fall fiesta of San Jerónimo which features folkloric dances and other street processions, such as the carnivalesque "Torovenado" celebrations, which often have groups and individuals who perform satires of local and national political figures.

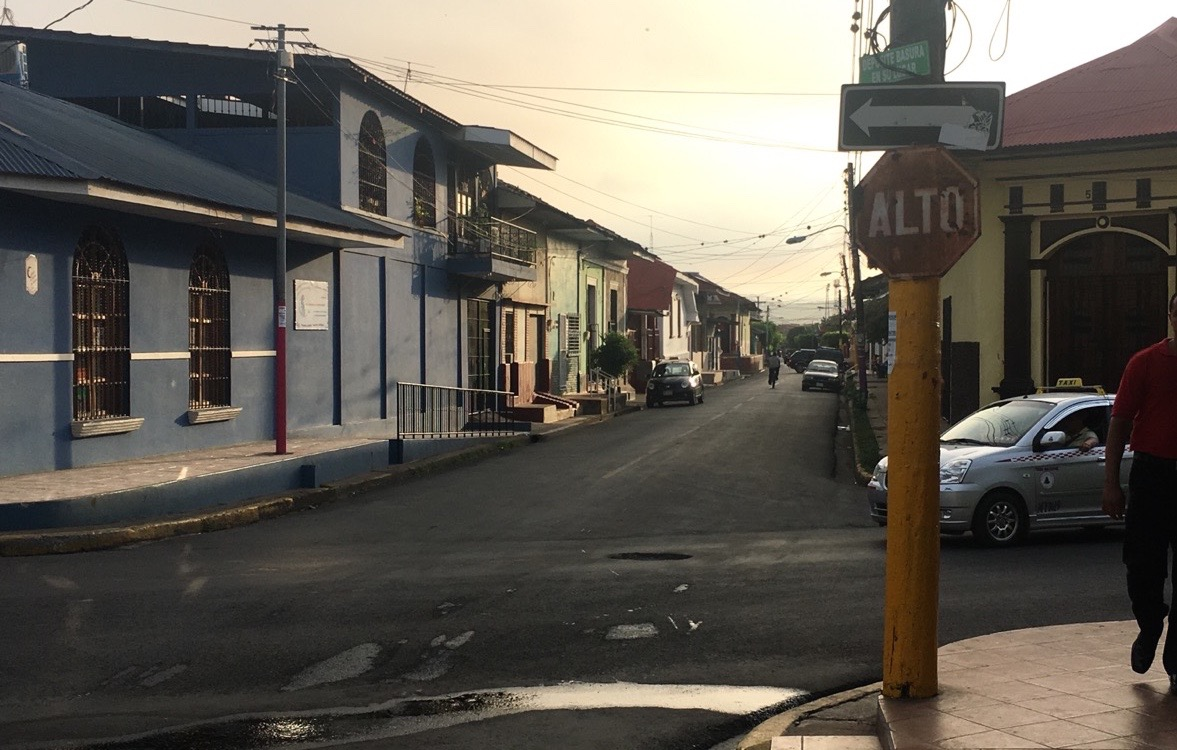
Street view of Masaya

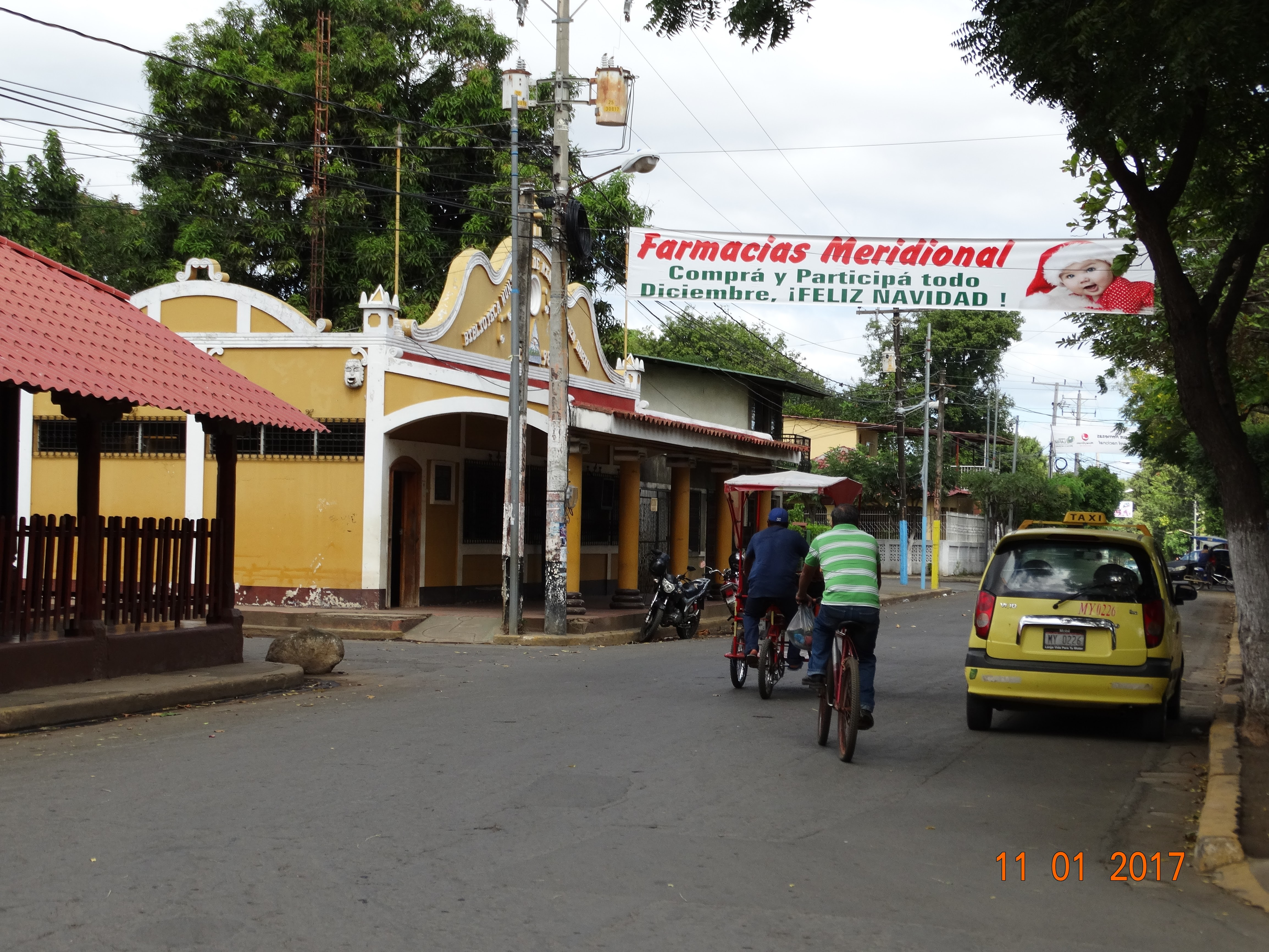
Near the Parque San Jerónimo

The historical city center has open plazas and two large 16th-century baroque architecture churches: the Assumption's Parish Church, and St. Gerome's Church. But there are other colonial gems like St. John's, St. John Bosco's, and St. Michael's.

Masaya is actually the name of one of Nicaragua's Departments, which the city of Masaya is the head of. In addition to Masaya, the department includes the municipal cities of Catarina, Nindirí, Masatepe, Tisma, Niquinohomo, Nandasmo, San Juan de Oriente and La Concepción.

== Masaya Volcano ==
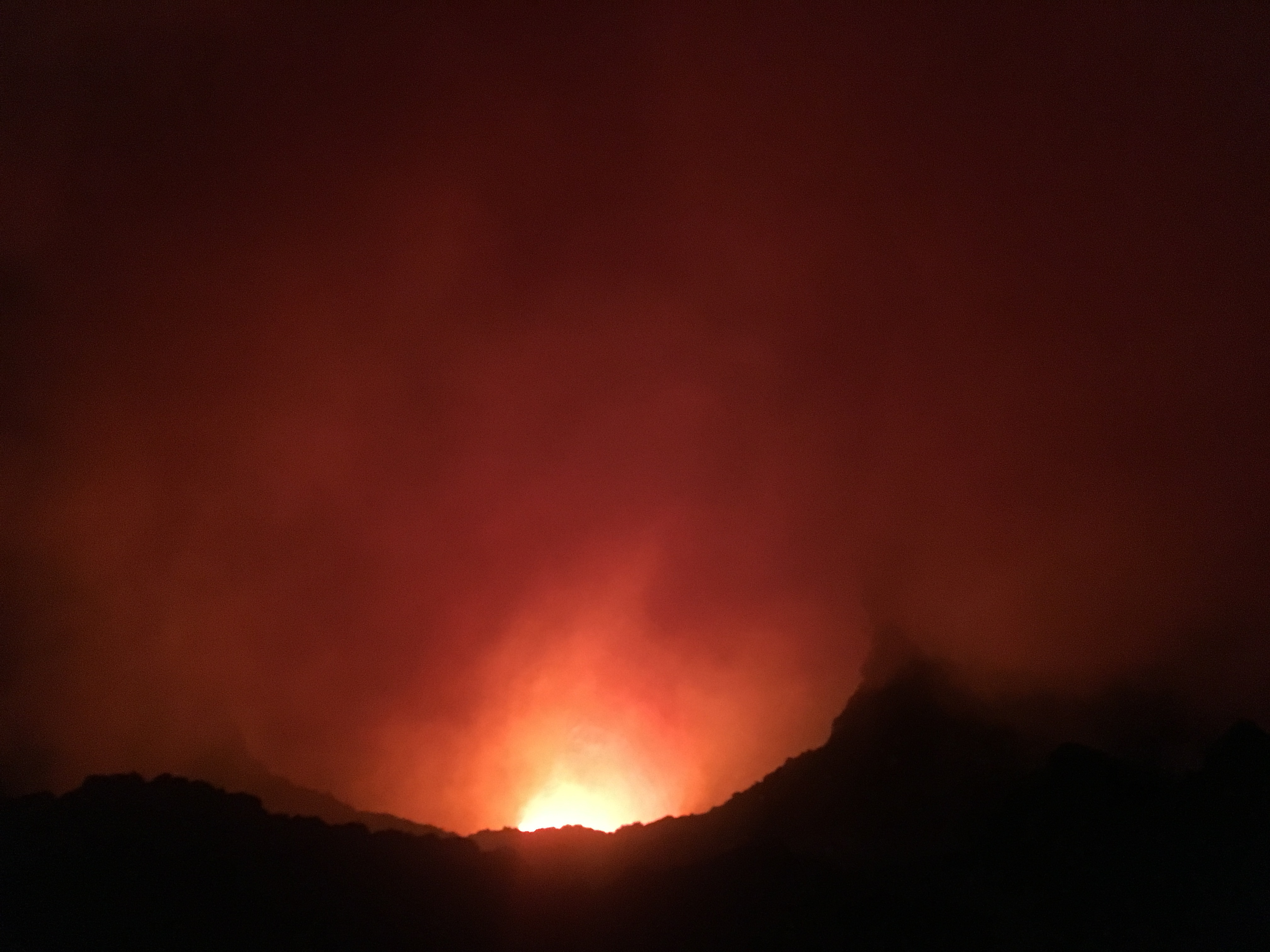
View of Masaya Volcano

Volcán Masaya National Park is a popular tourist site. It has a small museum and tourist information. Tour guides and proper equipment are provided for treks inside bat caves created by lava flows from past eruptions. Today, lava can be visible in the volcano's crater. Masaya is the most active volcano in the region. It is actually made up of two volcanoes: Masaya and Nindirí with a total of five craters. The Spanish first described the volcano in 1524 and believed the belching lava to be melting gold. But when Fray Bartolomé de las Casas first saw it he called it the "Gates of Hell". Since then, Masaya Volcano has erupted at least 19 times. From 1965 to 1979 the volcano contained an active lava lake. The last reported eruption event was in 2003, when a plume reportedly shot ~4.6 km into the air. Masaya is an unusual basaltic volcano because it has had explosive eruptions. An eruption in 4550 B.C. was one of the largest on Earth in the last 10,000 years.

== Apoyo Lake ==
The City of Masaya is also located west of a large, deep crater lake named "Apoyo". which is part of the Apoyo Lagoon Natural Reserve. This lake is a popular attraction in the area, and is host to several hostels and small resorts. Apoyo's crater measures four miles wide and over 656 feet deep. Major activities include fishing, water sports and scuba diving. Archaeological researchers have found evidence of pre-colonial occupation.

== Coyotepe Fortress ==
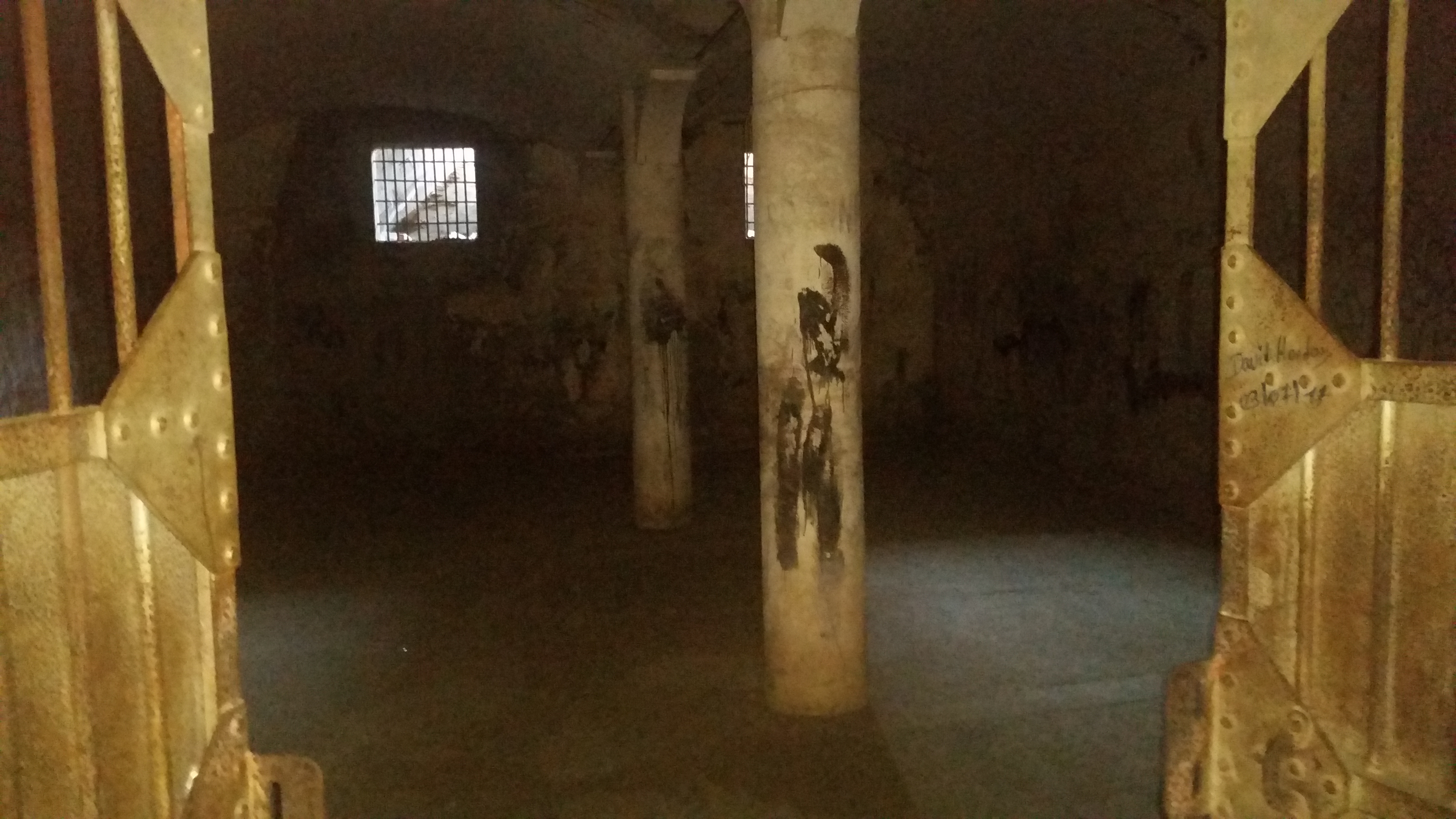
Coyotepe Fortress cell

Coyotepe is an old fortress located on a sharp hill from where it takes its name which has now been converted into a museum. Built at the turn of the 20th century by President José S. Zelaya, this site witnessed a fierce battle on October 2–4, 1912, when a Nicaraguan rebel force led by General Benjamín Zeledón occupying Coyotepe and another hill overlooking the strategic rail line, Barranca, refused to surrender to government troops under President Adolfo Díaz. U.S. Marine Major Smedley Butler's marine battalion, that Zeledón's rebels had skirmished with on September 19, returning from Granada, Nicaragua on October 3, shelled the rebel stronghold on Coyotepe. During the pre-dawn hours on October 4, Butler's battalion, in concert with two marine battalions and one from the USS California led by marine Colonel Joseph H. Pendleton converged from different positions to storm the hill and capture it. Also General Benjamín Zeledón was killed, at the age of 33, and his dead body dragged from a trotting horse, to instill fear among the population and to prevent a potential uprising. But quite to the contrary, Zeledón's death was the spark that inspired Augusto C. Sandino and other famous figures to fight for 7 years in the Segovias in the Northern Nicaraguan mountains, against the cruel invaders. President Anastasio Somoza rehabilitated the fortress in the late 1930s and it was used as a detention facility during periods of civil unrest. In the 1950s, it was used to train Guatemala radio operators that supported the CIA organized Operation PB Success that successfully overthrew President Jacobo Arbenz, a left leaning Army Colonel in 1954. From the 1950s onward, it was used as a dump for obsolete army materiel. In the 1960s, another President Somoza ordered it to be donated to the Boy Scouts Organization. For many years, Coyotepe remained a military outpost but it was given away to the Boy Scouts Association by the 1970s. The fortress built in the 19th century has 43 jail cells, 28 of them on the upper floor, where windows let the air and sunlight in. Each of the upper floor cells could contain from 15 to 20 prisoners, sometimes even more. The basement cells, on the other hand, resembled a dungeon for they were dark, damp, stuffy, and cramped so prisoners would lose track of time and inevitably ended up with psychological trauma. In all in its early years at the turn of the century, there were about 1,000 prisoners at any one time. Nevertheless, as time went on, the site was abandoned by the Boy Scout Association from 1983 to 1992. During that period, there were rumours among the population that Coyotepe was used as a sanctuary for Satanic practices for there was no proper security. Finally, the new neoliberal governments that won the elections in 1990, finally returned Coyotepe to the Boy Scouts Association.

== Gastronomy ==
Masaya boasts a varied culinary tradition based on pre-Columbian recipes. Nacatamal is a giant tamal, made of corn flour sprinkled with annatto and salt, and mixed with pork, bacon, a bit of rice, potato slices, onions, tomatoes, green peppers, mint, Congo chilis, and prunes. Then everything is covered in plantain leaves, tied up with ropes, and boiled for a couple of hours on a giant pot. Nacatamals are normally eaten at breakfast or supper with a loaf of bread and black coffee.

Vaho is another heavy meal, normally eaten at lunch. It consists of thick, long slices of salted, dried beef marinated in sour orange juice. The beef is mixed with yucca, green plantains, ripe plantains, tomatoes, onions, garlic, cabbage, and placed on a pot with the interior walls lined with plantain leaves, and then covered with the same leaves and a lid, and steamed slowly. Vaho is eaten with tortillas. Yucca tubers are essential to Masayan food whether boiled, steamed, fried, or broiled and used in many different dishes such as vigorón. Vigorón consists of boiled yucca, topped with sweet-and-sour cabbage cut into strips, diced tomatoes, onions, green currants, Congo chilis, vinegar, and salt.

== Climate ==
Masaya has a tropical savanna climate (Köppen: Aw).

Climate data for Masaya
| Month | Jan | Feb | Mar | Apr | May | Jun | Jul | Aug | Sep | Oct | Nov | Dec | Year |
|---|---|---|---|---|---|---|---|---|---|---|---|---|---|
| Mean daily maximum °C (°F) | 29.8 (85.6) | 30.5 (86.9) | 31.4 (88.5) | 32.4 (90.3) | 31.6 (88.9) | 30.2 (86.4) | 30.0 (86.0) | 30.3 (86.5) | 30.2 (86.4) | 29.6 (85.3) | 29.5 (85.1) | 29.7 (85.5) | 30.4 (86.8) |
| Daily mean °C (°F) | 25.6 (78.1) | 26.1 (79.0) | 26.9 (80.4) | 27.9 (82.2) | 27.5 (81.5) | 26.5 (79.7) | 26.4 (79.5) | 26.5 (79.7) | 26.3 (79.3) | 26.0 (78.8) | 25.8 (78.4) | 25.8 (78.4) | 26.4 (79.6) |
| Mean daily minimum °C (°F) | 22.0 (71.6) | 22.1 (71.8) | 22.6 (72.7) | 23.7 (74.7) | 24.1 (75.4) | 23.8 (74.8) | 23.7 (74.7) | 23.6 (74.5) | 23.4 (74.1) | 23.3 (73.9) | 22.8 (73.0) | 22.5 (72.5) | 23.1 (73.6) |
| Average precipitation mm (inches) | 6.2 (0.24) | 4.3 (0.17) | 6.0 (0.24) | 25.0 (0.98) | 183.1 (7.21) | 223.7 (8.81) | 132.7 (5.22) | 160.1 (6.30) | 207.8 (8.18) | 243.0 (9.57) | 91.4 (3.60) | 16.7 (0.66) | 1,300 (51.18) |
| Mean monthly sunshine hours | 288.4 | 274.3 | 305.4 | 292.7 | 271.4 | 251.8 | 273.8 | 271.7 | 245.3 | 233.6 | 244.0 | 271.6 | 3,224 |
Source: Weather.Directory

== Sports ==
In November 2026, Masaya co-hosted the 2026 U-23 Baseball World Cup along with two other Nicaraguan cities, Managua and León.

== Notable people ==
Relevant writers include:

- Ernesto Mejía Sánchez – poet, critic, and philologist.
- Sergio Ramírez – award-winning writer.
- Mario Cajina-Vega – storyteller and poet.
- Juan Ramón Avilés.
- Julio Valle Castillo.

Historians such as:

- Tomás Ayón.
- Jerónimo Pérez.
- Francisco Ortega.
- Andrés Vega Bolaños.
- Alejandro Bolaños Geyer.
- Abelino Eskorcia.
- Francisco-Ernesto Martínez Morales.
- Alberto Bendaña.
- David Canda.

Athletes such as:

- José Miguel Martínez Rojas – a distinguished ultramarathon runner who has represented Nicaragua in international long-distance and ultra-endurance races, including overnight competitions and events across various terrains.

Intellectuals such as:

- Alejandro Serrano Caldera – jurist and philosopher.
- Alejandro Dávila Bolaños – physician and linguist.
- Enrique Peña Hernández – jurist and linguist, and a researcher of Nicaraguan folklore.
- Nydia Palacios – renowned academic.
- Gustavo Alemán Bolaños.
- Iván Escobar Fornos – jurist and politician.
- Manuel Coronel Matus.
- Alcides Gutiérrez Barreto – folklorist.

Musicians and composers:

- Alejandro Vega Matus.
- Carlos Ramírez Velásquez.
- Ramiro Vega Jiménez.
- Fernando Luna Jiménez.
- Carmen Vega Raudez.
- Weimar Serrano – pianist and composer.
- Hernaldo Zúñiga – renowned singer-songwriter.
- Nieves Martínez – acclaimed singer-songwriter and “hijo dilecto” (honored son) of Masaya.

Dancers and dance educators:

- Haydée Palacios Vivas – teacher, dancer, and folklorist from Masaya, known for promoting Nicaraguan folkloric dance. She is the founder of the Ballet Folklórico Haydée Palacios.
- René A. M. Rojas – dancer and performer trained in modern dance, and a pioneer in the promotion of Arabic dance in Nicaragua.

Poets such as:

- Ana Ilce Gómez Ortega.
- Manuel Maldonado.
- Alberto Ortiz.
- Anselmo Sequeira.
- Eudoro Solís.
- Ezequiel D’León Masís.
- Augusto Flores Z.
- Delgaleón.
- Venancio Calvo.
- Adolfo Zamora.

Others:

- Enrique Bolaños, former Nicaraguan president
- Olga Núñez Abaunza, first Nicaraguan female lawyer

== Twin towns – sister cities ==
- Belo Horizonte, Brazil
- Cartago, Costa Rica
- Dietzenbach, Germany
- Leicester, England, United Kingdom
- Nijmegen, Netherlands
