= Carlos Martínez Rivas =

Carlos Martínez Rivas (1924–1998) was a Nicaraguan poet, most famous for his poem "El paraíso recobrado" ("The recovered paradise"), a love poem first published in 1944.

== Early years and time in Spain ==
Rivas was born on October 12, 1924, in Puerto de Ocoz, Guatemala, where his parents were vacationing.

From an early age, Martinez Rivas showed a special talent for poetry. He won his first poetry competition at age 16 and at age 18, while still a high school student at Colegio Centro-América, a Jesuit school in Managua, he wrote "El paraiso recobrado" ("paradise regained") which was published in 1944.

After graduating from high school, Martinez Rivas moved to Spain. While living in Spain he studied literature and philosophy at the Universidad Complutense de Madrid and wrote a couple of pieces that were published in "Alferez", a Spanish magazine that also published works by Julio Ycaza Tigerino and Pablo Antonio Cuadra. (1)

== Mexico and diplomatic career ==
Martinez Rivas moved to Mexico in the early 1950s. There he published his most famous work, a book of poems titled "La insurrección solitaria" ("The solitary insurrection"), which was to become Rivas's last published work.

After Mexico, Martinez Rivas worked for the Nicaraguan foreign service. In this capacity he lived in Los Angeles, Paris, San José, Costa Rica and again in Madrid.

After his diplomatic career, Martinez Rivas worked as a professor at the Universidad Nacional Autónoma de Nicaragua.

He died in Managua, Nicaragua on June 16, 1998. He is buried in Granada, Nicaragua
