= Emil (given name) =

Male given name

- Gender: Male

Other gender
- Feminine: Emila; Emilia; Emily

Origin
- Meaning: Laborious, rival, eager, to strive, to excel
- Region of origin: Europe

Other names
- Variant forms: Emil; Émile
- Related names: Amil

The name Emil, Emile, or Émile is a male given name of Indo-European origin.

This name has multiple meanings: laborious, rival, or eager, which are derived from the Latin Aemilius of the gens Aemilia. In the German language, the name is derived from the word emelen, which means "to strive," or "to excel."

Emil is used predominantly among the peoples of European nations. It is in the top 100 names given to boys in Germany. The female equivalents to the name are Emila, Emilia, and Emily.

In the Balkans, Emil is popular among Bosniaks in the former Yugoslav nations. In this region, it is used as a male given name, while the female equivalent is Emila. The name is an alternative variant to the name Amil, which is also popular among Bosniaks. Emil is in the top 100 most popular given names in Bosnia and Herzegovina.

In Azerbaijan, Emil is also a popular name. As per official statistics shared by Ministry of Justice (Azerbaijan), Emil was 31st most used name in the country between 2020 and 2025.

== Emil ==
- Emil Aaltonen (1869–1949), Finnish industrialist and philanthropist
- Emil Andersson (sport shooter) (born 1979), Swedish running target shooter
- Emil Andersson (table tennis) (born 1993), Swedish table tennis player
- Emil Artin (1898–1962), Austrian mathematician
- Emil Atlason (born 1993), Icelandic footballer
- Emil Bachrach (1874–1937), Russian-American entrepreneur
- Emil Barth (1879–1941), German Social Democratic party worker
- Emil von Behring (1854–1917), German physiologist who received the 1901 Nobel Prize in Physiology or Medicine
- Emil Bemström (born 1999), Swedish ice hockey player
- Emil Berg, Swedish singer
- Emil Berna (1907–2000), Swiss cinematographer
- Emil Bove (born c. 1982), American attorney
- Emil Brown (born 1974), American baseball outfielder
- Emil Brunner (1889–1966), Swiss theologian
- Emil Calmanovici (1896–1956), Romanian businessman and communist militant
- Emil Cedercreutz (1879–1949), Finnish sculptor
- Emil Chuprenski (born 1960), Bulgarian boxer
- Emil Cioran (1911–1995), French-Romanian writer
- Emil Constantinescu (born 1939), President of Romania from 1996 to 2000
- Emil Dardak (born 1984), Indonesian politician
- Emil (Fritz) Dietrich (1898–1948), German Nazi SS officer executed for war crimes
- Emil Dill (1861–1938), Swiss painter
- Emil Dimitriev (born 1979), interim Prime Minister of the Republic of Macedonia
- Emil Dimitrov (1940–2005), Bulgarian singer
- Emil Dorian (1893–1956), Romanian poet and prose writer
- Emil Ekiyor Jr. (born 2000), American football player
- Emil Ernst (1889–1942), German astronomer
- Emil Ferris (born 1962), American writer, cartoonist, and designer
- Emil Fischer (1852–1919), German chemist
- Emil Fischer (American football executive) (1887–1958), American businessman and football executive
- Emil Fischer (bass) (1838–1914), German opera singer
- Emil Fischer (cartographer) (1838–1898), American cartographer
- Emil Fjellström (1884–1944), Swedish actor
- Emil Forsberg (born 1991), Swedish international footballer
- Emil Forselius (1974–2010), Swedish actor
- Emil Gilels (1916–1985), Russian pianist
- Emil Giurgiuca (1906–1992), Romanian poet
- Emil Guillermo (born c. 1959), American journalist
- Emil Hácha (1872–1945), president of Czechoslovakia
- Emil Hedvall (born 1983), Swedish footballer
- Emil G. Hirsch (1852–1923), American rabbi
- Emil Högberg (born 1976), Swedish politician
- Emil Janel (1897–1981), Swedish artist
- Emil Jannings (1884–1950), German actor
- Emil Johansson (boxer) (1907–1986), Swedish boxer
- Emil Johansson (floorball) (born 1992), Swedish floorball player
- Emil Johansson (footballer) (born 1986), Swedish footballer
- Emil Johansson (ice hockey) (born 1996), Swedish ice hockey player
- Emil Johansson (sprinter) (born 2002), Swedish sprinter
- Emil Johnson (born c. 1966), drummer for Black Flag
- Emil Jones (born 1935), American politician, president of the Illinois State Senate
- Emil Jones, III (born 1978), American politician, Illinois Senate member
- Emil Kapaun (1916–1951), Roman Catholic priest, US Army Chaplain who died in the Korean War, US Congressional Medal of Honor in 2013
- Emil Karas (1933–1974), American football linebacker for the San Diego Chargers
- Emil Theodor Kocher (1841–1917), Swiss physician and researcher, received the 1909 Nobel Prize in Physiology or Medicine
- Emil Kornvig (born 2000), Danish footballer
- Emil Kostadinov (born 1967), Bulgarian football player
- Emil Kraepelin (1856–1926), German psychiatrist
- Emil Krupa-Krupinsky (1872–1924), German portrait painter, genre painter and graphic artist
- Emil Lenz, Russian physicist and creator of Lenz's law
- Emil Lerp (1886–1966), German businessman and inventor
- Emil Lindenfeld (1905–1986), Hungarian-American oil-painter
- Emil Ludwig (1881–1948), German-Swiss biographer
- Emil Mangelsdorff (1925–2022), German jazz musician
- Emil Martinec (born 1958), American theoretical physics professor
- Emil Maurice (1897–1972), founding member of the SS and Hitler's personal chauffeur during the 1920s
- Emil Miljković (born 1988), Bosnian footballer
- Emil Minty (born 1972), Australian former child actor
- Emil Molt (1876–1936), German industrialist, social reformer, and anthroposophist
- Emil Nödtveidt (born 1976), Swedish guitarist in the band Deathstars
- Emil Nolde (1867–1956), German painter and printmaker
- Emil Paleček (1930–2018), Czech biochemist
- Emil Leon Post (1897–1954), American mathematician
- Emil Perttilä (1875–1933), Finnish politician
- Emil Puhl (1889–1962), German Nazi-era economist and banking official
- Emil Rebreanu (died 1917), Austro-Hungarian Romanian military officer
- Emil Salim (born 1930), Indonesian politician and economist
- Emil Savundra (1923–1976), British-Tamil businessman convicted of fraud
- Emil Ludwig Schmidt (1837–1906), German anthropologist and ethnologist
- Emil Schult (born 1946), German artist and collaborator with seminal electronic music group Kraftwerk
- Emil Schulz (1938–2010), German boxer
- Emil Seckel (1864–1924), German jurist and law historian
- Emil Sitka (1914–1998), American actor
- Emil Škoda (1839–1900), Czech engineer
- Emil Steinberger (actor), Swiss comedian, writer, director and actor
- Emil Steinberger (endocrinologist), American endocrinologist
- Emil Stoyanov (born 1959), Bulgarian politician
- Emil Sumangil, Filipino journalist
- Emil Szolomajer (born 1974), Romanian soccer player
- Emil Páleš (born 1966), Slovak scientist and philosopher
- Emil Paul Tscherrig (1947–2026), Swiss Catholic priest, diplomat of the Holy See
- Emil Unanue (1934–2022), Cuban immunologist
- Emil Unfried (1892–1949), German communist politician and businessman
- Emil Urbel (born 1959), Estonian architect
- Emil Utitz (1883–1956), Czech philosopher
- Emil "Teddy" Vorster (1910–1976), German racing driver and entrepreneur
- Emil Werstler, American guitarist for death metal band Dååth
- Emil Wilbekin (born 1967), American journalist
- Emil Wingstedt (born 1975), Swedish orienteering competitor
- Emil Wojtaszek (1927–2017), Polish politician
- Emil Zátopek (1922–2000), Czech long-distance runner
- Emil Zsigmondy (1861–1885), Austrian physician and mountain climber

== Emile ==
- Emile Abraham (born 1974), Trinidad and Tobago cyclist
- Emile Acquah (born 2000), English footballer
- Emile Andze Andze, Cameroonian politician
- Emile Anner (born 1940), Swiss boxer
- Emile de Antonio (1919–1989), American film director
- Emile Nguza Arao, Kenyan aviator and corporate executive
- Emile Ardolino (1943–1993), American director and producer
- Emile Bakale (born 1987), Swimmer from Republic of the Congo
- Emile Barnes (1892–1970), American jazz musician
- Emile Baron (born 1979), South African footballer
- Emile Barron (1937–2015), Surinamese footballer
- Emile Béaruné (born 1990), New Caledonian footballer
- Emile Beaulieu (1931–2016), American politician, twice Mayor of Manchester, New Hampshire
- Emile Berliner (1851–1929), German-born American inventor
- Emile Zola Berman (1902–1981), American lawyer
- Emile Bernheim (1886–1985), Belgian industrialist
- Emile De Beukelaer (1867–1922), Belgian cyclist
- Emile Boeres (1890–1944), Composer and musician
- Emile Kellogg Boisot (1859–1941), American banker
- Emile Bongeli (born 1952), Congolese politician
- Emile Boreo (1885–1951), American actor
- Emile Boulpaep (born 1938), Belgian physiologist
- Emile Boustany (1909–2002), Lebanese military officer
- Emile Brichard (1899–2004), Belgian cyclist
- Emile Burns (1889–1972), British communist and author
- Emile Bustani (1907–1963), Lebanese entrepreneur and politician
- Emile Cairess (born 1997), British long-distance runner
- Emile Calmes (born 1954), Luxembourgish politician
- Emile Capgras (1926–2014), Martinican politician
- Emile Capouya (1925–2005), American writer
- Emile Pierre Joseph De Cauwer (1828–1873), Belgian architectural painter
- Emile Chabal, British historian
- Emile Christian (1895–1973), American jazz trombonist
- Emile Claus (1849–1924), Belgian painter
- Emile Clement (1844–1928), German ethnographer and collector
- Emile Czaja (1909–1970), Australian-Indian wrestler and actor
- Emile Beaumont d'Erlanger (1866–1939), French-born British merchant banker
- Emile Daems (1938–2024), Belgian cyclist
- Emile Dechaineux (1902–1944), Royal Australian Navy officer
- Emile Decroix (1904–1967), Belgian cyclist
- Emile Degelin (1926–2017), Belgian film director and novelist
- Emile Deleau Jr. (1923–1945), United States Army Medal of Honor recipient
- Emile Despres (1909–1973), American economist and professor
- Emile Destombes (1935–2016), French Roman Catholic bishop
- Emile Detiege (born c. 1840), American politician
- Emile Diatta, Senegalese politician
- Emile Doumba (born 1944), Gabonese politician
- Emile Duprée (1936–2023), Canadian professional wrestler and promoter
- Emile Duson (1904–1942), Dutch field hockey player
- Emile Eicher (born 1955), Luxembourgish politician
- Emile Eid (1925–2009), Lebanese bishop
- Chris Emile, American dancer
- Jonathan Emile (born 1986), Jamaican-Canadian rapper, singer and record producer
- Taungaroa Emile, New Zealand actor
- Yonan Emile, Iraqi basketball player
- Emile Erasmus (born 1992), South African sprinter
- Emile Etchegaray (1879–1941), Brazilian footballer
- Emile Faurie (born 1963), British equestrian
- Emile Fontaine (footballer), French footballer
- Emile Ford (1937–2016), Saint Lucian musician and singer
- Emile Francis (1926–2022), Canadian ice hockey player, coach and general manager
- Emile Fritz (1920–2015), American football player
- Emile Garcke (1856–1930), English industrialist
- Emile Gauvreau (1891–1956), American journalist
- Emile St. Godard (1905–1948) Sorel, Québec, Canadian dog musher
- Emile Grandjean (1861–1942), American forester
- Emile Griffith (1938–2013), American boxer
- Emile Gruppe (1896–1978), American painter
- Emile Guebehi (1937–2008), Ivoirian sculptor
- Emile Gumbs (1926–2016), Anguillan Head of Government
- Emile Haag (born 1942), Luxembourgish historian
- Emile Habibi (1922–1996), Palestinian-Israeli writer of Arabic literature and politician
- Emile Harry (born 1963), American football player
- Emile Haynie (born 1980), American record producer
- Emile van Heerden (born 2000), South African rugby union player
- Emile Hemmen (1923–2021), Luxembourgish writer
- Emile Hendrix (born 1955), Dutch equestrian
- Emile Hennequin (1859–1888), French writer
- Emile Heskey (born 1978), English footballer
- Emile Hirsch (born 1985), American actor
- Emile Hirsch (painter) (1832–1904), French stained-glass artist and painter
- Emile Honoré (fl. 1868–1877), African American politician
- Emile Ilboudo, Burkinabé politician and diplomat
- Emile Ilunga, Congolese politician
- Emile Jansen (1959–2024), Dutch actor
- Emile Kirscht (1913–1994), Luxembourgish abstract painter
- Emile Kriek (born 1989), South African cricketer
- Emile Kuri (1907–2000), American set decorator
- Emile Henry Lacombe (1846–1924), American judge
- Emile Lahner (1893–1980), Hungarian artist
- Emile Lahoud Jr. (born 1975), Lebanese politician and swimmer
- Emile Lahure (born 1947), Luxembourgish footballer
- Emile Janne de Lamare, French mining engineer
- Emile Lamm (1834–1873), American inventor
- Emile Lejeune (1853–1916), United States Navy sailor
- Emile Leray (born 1949), French electrician
- Emile Levisetti, American actor
- Emile Linkers (born 1990), Dutch professional football player
- Emile Armet de Lisle (1853–1928), French industrialist and chemist
- Emile de Lissa (1871–1955), Australian rugby union player
- Emile Littler (1903–1985), English theatrical impresario, producer and author
- Emile John Lussier (1895–1974), American flying ace during World War I
- Emile de Cartier de Marchienne (1871–1946), Belgian diplomat
- Emile Marchildon (1888–1967), Canadian ice hockey player
- Emile Mushosho Matabaro (born 1967), Congolese Catholic prelate
- Emile McMaster (1864–1917), English cricketer
- Emile Mercier (cartoonist) (1901–1981), Australian cartoonist
- Emile Meyer (1910–1987), American actor
- Emile Mollard (1895–1991), French general
- Emile Mond (1865–1938), German businessman
- Emile P. Moses (1880–1965), American Marine Corps Major General
- Emile Mosseri (born 1985), American musician
- Emile De Mot (1835–1909), Belgian liberal politician and mayor of Brussels
- Emile Mota (born 1956), Chief of Cabinet of the late President of Democratic Republic of the Congo
- Emile van Rouveroy van Nieuwaal (1939–2025), Dutch filmmaker and academic
- Emile Norman (1918–2009), American sculptor
- Emile Nurenberg (1918–1990), Luxembourgish footballer
- Emile Obre (1881–1934), French aviator
- Emile Ounei (born 1996), New Caledonian footballer
- Emile Pandolfi (born 1946), American pianist
- Emile Hertling Péronard (born 1979), Greenlandic film producer
- Emile G. Perrot (1872–1954), American architect
- Emile Yves Picot (1862–1938), French soldier and politician
- Emile Plantamour (1815–1882), Swiss astronomer
- Emile Rahme (born 1952), Lebanese politician
- Emile Rajah (born 1987), Trinidadian cricketer
- Emile Ramsammy (born 1962), Trinidad and Tobago jockey
- Emile Ratelband (born 1949), Dutch entrepreneur and non-fiction writer
- Emile Renan (1913–2001), American opera singer
- Emile Riachi (1926–2014), Lebanese physician
- Emile Roemer (born 1962), Dutch politician
- Emile Smith Rowe (born 2000), English footballer
- Emile de Ruelle (1880–1948), American film editor
- Emile Rustom (born 1952), Lebanese footballer and coach
- Emile Saimovici (born 1993), Barbadian footballer
- Emile Saint-Lot (1904–1976), Haitian politician, lawyer, and journalist
- Emile Samyn (born 1997), Belgian footballer
- Emile Santiago (1899–1995), American costume designer
- Emile B. De Sauzé (1878–1964), French-born American university teacher
- Emile La Sére (1802–1882), American politician
- Emile Severeyns (1931–1979), Belgian track cyclist and bicycle racer
- Emile Sheng (born 1968), Taiwanese politician
- Emile Sherman (born 1972), Australian film producer
- Emile Short (born 1943), Ghanaian judge
- Emile Shoufani (1947–2024), Israeli Arab Christian theologist
- Emile Sinclair (born 1987), English footballer
- Emile Smith (born 1977), South African field hockey player
- Emile Straker (1936–2026), Barbadian musician
- Emile Temperman (born 1991), South African rugby union player
- Emile Paul Tendeng (born 1992), Senegalese footballer
- Emile Touma (1919–1985), Palestinian historian
- Emile Vandervelde (1866–1938), Belgian politician
- Emile Waldteufel (cyclist) (born 1944), American cyclist
- Emile Wauters (1846–1933), Belgian painter
- Emile Kits van Waveren (1906–1995), Dutch mycologist
- Emile Waxweiler (1867–1916), Belgian sociologist
- Emile Weil (1878–1945), American architect
- Emile Wennekes (born 1963), Dutch musicologist
- Emile Wessels (born 1979), Namibia international rugby union player
- Emile Wijntuin (1924–2020), Suriname politician
- Emile Witbooi (born 2007), South African soccer player
- Emile A. Zatarain Sr. (1866–1959), American grocer and food entrepreneur
- Emile Zuckerkandl (1922–2013), Austrian-French biologist

== Émile ==
- Émile Abonnenc (1905–1989), Soft redirect to Wikispecies
- Émile Achard (1860–1944), French internist
- Émile Acollas (1826–1891), French jurist
- Émile Aillaud (1902–1988), French architect
- Émile Albert (1822–1865), French composer and pianist
- Émile Albrecht (1897–1927), Swiss rower
- Émile Ali-Khan (born 1902), French sprinter
- Émile Allais (1912–2012), French alpine skier
- Émile Allegret (1907–1990), French soldier and member of the French Resistance
- Émile Amagat (1841–1915), French physicist
- Émile Amann (1880–1948), French historian
- Émile Amélineau (1850–1915), French archaeologist
- Émile Amoros (born 1995), French sailor
- Émile André (1871–1933), French artist and architect
- Émile Andrieu (1881–1955), Belgian footballer
- Émile Antonio (1928–2022), French footballer
- Émile Appay (1876–1935), French painter
- Émile Arbogast (1901–1978), French swimmer
- Émile Van Arenbergh (1854–1934), Belgian magistrate, poet and biographer
- Émile Argand (1879–1940), Swiss geologist
- Émile Armand (1872–1962), French individualist anarchist
- Émile Arnaud (1864–1921), French lawyer and pacifist
- Émile Asselin (born 1996), Canadian curler
- Émile Aubin (1866–1949), French anarcho-syndicalist
- Émile Aubrun (1881–1967), French aviator
- Émile Aubry (printer) (1829–1900), French printer
- Émile Aubry (painter) (1880–1964), French painter
- Émile Augier (1820–1889), French dramatist
- Émile Van Averbeke (1876–1946), Belgian architect
- Émile Baas (1906–1984), French essayist
- Émile Bachelet (1863–1946), French-American inventor
- Émile Baes (1879–1953), Belgian painter, pastel artist, draughtsman and writer
- Émile Baffert (1924–2017), French cyclist
- Émile Banning (1836–1898), Belgian civil servant
- Émile Baraize (1874–1952), French egyptologist
- Émile Barbier (born 1901), Belgian fencer
- Émile Barillon (1860–1935), French Catholic bishop
- Émile Barral (1891–1961), Monegasque Olympic sailor
- Émile Barrière (1902–1936), French aviator
- Émile Basly (1854–1928), French trade unionist
- Émile Bastien-Lepage (1854–1938), French painter and architect
- Émile Baudot (1845–1903), French telegraph engineer and inventor
- Émile Baumann (1868–1941), French writer
- Émile Napoléon Baumann (1835–1910), French horticulturalist
- Émile Bayard (1837–1891), French illustrator
- Émile Beaussier (1874–1943), French painter
- Émile Beaussire (1824–1889), French politician
- Émile Belcourt (1926–2017), Canadian operatic tenor
- Émile Bénard (1844–1929), French architect and painter
- Émile Bender (1871–1953), French politician
- Émile Benoît (1913–1992), Canadian musician
- Émile Benveniste (1902–1976), Ottoman-born French linguist
- Émile Bergerat (1845–1923), French poet, playwright, essayist
- Émile Berlia (1878–1946), French politician
- Émile Bermyn (1920–1973), French water polo player
- Émile Bernard (1868–1941), French painter
- Émile Bernard (composer) (1843–1902), French composer and organist
- Émile Bernard (chef) (1826–1897), French chef
- Émile Bertrand (1844–1909), French mineralogist
- Émile Bescherelle (1828–1903), French botanist and bryologist
- Émile Biayenda (1927–1977), Catholic cardinal
- Émile Bienaimé (1802–1869), French composer
- Émile Billard (1852–1930), French sailor
- Émile Bilodeau (born 1996), Canadian singer-songwriter
- Émile Bin (1825–1897), French painter
- Émile Binet (1908–1958), Belgian long jumper
- Émile Blanchard (1819–1900), French zoologist and entomologist
- Émile Blessig (1947–2025), French politician
- Émile Bodart (born 1942), Belgian cyclist
- Émile Boeswillwald (1815–1896), French architect
- Émile Boirac (1851–1917), French philosopher
- Émile Boitelle (1898–1951), French gymnast
- Émile Boitout, French sports shooter
- Émile Bollaert (1890–1978), French politician
- Émile Constant Bombet (1941–2026), Ivorian politician
- Émile Bongiorni (1921–1949), French footballer
- Émile Bonvouloir (1875–1969), Canadian politician
- Émile de Borchgrave (1837–1917), Belgian historian and diplomat
- Émile Borel (1871–1956), French mathematician
- Émile Bouchard (1919–2012), Canadian ice hockey player
- Émile Bouhours (1870–1953), French cyclist
- Émile Bourdon (1884–1974), French organist and composer
- Émile Bourgeois (1857–1934), French historian
- Émile Bourquelot (1851–1921), French chemist and professor of pharmacy
- Émile Boutmy (1835–1906), French political scientist and sociologist
- Émile Boutroux (1845–1921), French philosopher and historian
- Émile Brami (born 1950), French writer
- Émile Braun (1849–1927), Belgian engineer and politician
- Émile Bravo (born 1964), French comics artist
- Émile Bréhier (1876–1952), French historian of philosophy
- Émile Breton (1831–1902), French painter and engraver
- Émile Broussais (1855–1943), French politician
- Émile Broussard (born 1895), French cyclist
- Émile Brugsch (1842–1930), German Egyptologist
- Émile Brumpt (1877–1951), French parasitologist
- Émile Buisset (1866–1925), Belgian politician
- Émile Buisson (1902–1956), French gangster
- Émile Bulteel (1906–1978), French water polo player
- Émile Burnat (1828–1920), Swiss botanist
- Émile Cammaerts (1878–1953), Belgian playwright, poet and author
- Émile Campardon (1837–1915), French historian, archivist and writer
- Émile Le Camus (1839–1906), French Catholic priest, preacher, theologian, scripturist and bishop
- Émile Camuset, French clothing merchant
- Émile Camut (1849–1905), French architect
- Émile Carrara (1925–1992) (1925–1992), French bicycle racer and track cyclist
- Émile Cartailhac (1845–1921), French prehistorian
- Émile Chaline (1922–2020), French Navy admiral
- Émile Chambon (1905–1993), Swiss painter and illustrator
- Émile Champion (1879–1934), French long-distance runner
- Émile Chassinat (1868–1948), French Egyptologist
- Émile Chatelain (1851–1933), French Latinist, palaeographer and librarian
- Émile Chautard (1864–1934), French film director, actor, and screenwriter
- Émile Chautemps (1850–1918), French politician
- Émile Bellier de la Chavignerie (1821–1871), French art historian and journalist
- Émile Chevalet (1813–1894), French journalist, writer and librettist
- Émile Cheysson (1836–1910), French engineer
- Émile Clapeyron (1799–1864), French engineer and physicist
- Émile Clerc (born 1934), French rower
- Émile Clody (1903–1960), French wrestler
- Émile Cohl (1857–1938), French caricaturist
- Émile Colinus (1884–1966), French painter and illustrator
- Émile Colling (1899–1981), Luxembourgian doctor and politician
- Émile Colliot (1824–1881), French playwright and poet
- Émile Colonne (1885–1970), French opera singer
- Émile Combes (1835–1921), French statesman
- Émile Condroyer (1897–1950), French journalist and writer
- Émile Coornaert (1886–1980), French historian and journalist
- Émile Coppieters (1849–1922), Belgian politician
- Émile Cornellie (1869–1945), Belgian sailor
- Émile Cornic (1894–1964), French fencer
- Émile Coste (1862–1927), French fencer
- Émile Cottenet (1785–1833), French playwright
- Émile Cottin (1896–1936), French anarchist
- Émile Cotton (1872–1950), French mathematician
- Émile Coué (1857–1926), French psychologist
- Émile Coulaudon (1907–1977), French Army officer
- Émile Coulonvaux (1892–1966), Belgian lawyer and politician
- Émile Courtois (1918–2005), Belgian wrestler
- Émile Couzinet (1896–1964), French film producer and film director
- Émile Durkheim (1858–1917), French sociologist
- Émile de Girardin (1802–1881), French politician and journalist
- Émile Henry (anarchist) (1872–1894), French anarchist bomber
- Émile Lahoud (born 1936), former President of Lebanon
- Émile Legault (born 2000), Canadian soccer player
- Émile Mallet, Baron of Itapevi (1801–1886), French-Brazilian Marshal
- Émile Nelligan (1879–1941), French Canadian poet
- Émile Poulat, French priest, historian, and sociologist
- Émile Renouf (1845–1894), French painter and draughtsman
- Émile Ripert (1882–1948), French academic, poet, novelist and playwright
- Émile Servan-Schreiber (1888–1967), French journalist
- Émile Waldteufel (1837–1915), French composer
- Émile Zola (1840–1902), French novelist and journalist

== Fictional characters ==
- Emil Eagle, a villain in the Disney comics' Donald Duck universe
- Emil Skoda (Law & Order), M.D., on the TV crime dramas Law & Order
- Emil Svensson, title character of the children's book series Emil in Lönneberga by Astrid Lindgren

== See also ==
- Emil (disambiguation)
- Aemilius (disambiguation)
- Emilio (given name)
