= Emile =

Emile or Émile may refer to:

- Émile (novel) (1827), autobiographical novel based on Émile de Girardin's early life
- Emile, Canadian film made in 2003 by Carl Bessai
- Emile: or, On Education (1762) by Jean-Jacques Rousseau, a treatise on education; full title Émile ou de l'education

== People ==
- Emile (producer), American hip hop producer Emile Haynie
- Emil (given name), includes people and characters with given name Emile or Émile
- Barbara Emile, British television producer
- Chris Emile, American dancer
- Jonathan Emile, stage name of Jamaican-Canadian singer, rapper and record producer Jonathan Whyte Potter-Mäl (born 1986)
- Yonan Emile, Iraqi Olympic basketball player
- Emile Straker, Barbadian musician
- Emile Witbooi, South African soccer player

== See also ==
- Emil (disambiguation)
- Saint-Émile (disambiguation)
