= Broussais =

Broussais is a French given name and surname. Notable people with the name include:

- Broussais Coman Beck, American businessman
- Émile Broussais (1855–1943), French politician
- François-Joseph-Victor Broussais (1772–1838), French physician
