= Emil =

Emil may refer to:

== Literature ==
- Emil and the Detectives (1929), a children's novel
- "Emil", nickname of the Kurt Maschler Award for integrated text and illustration (1982–1999)
- Emil i Lönneberga, a series of children's novels by Astrid Lindgren

== People ==
- Emil (given name), including a list of people with the given name Emil or Emile
- Aquila Emil (died 2011), Papua New Guinean rugby league footballer
- Ridwan Kamil, Indonesian architect and politician, also known as Kang Emil

== Other ==
- Emil (river), in China and Kazakhstan
- Emil (tank), a Swedish tank developed in the 1950s
- Sturer Emil, a German tank destroyer
- Emil (Nier), a character from the Nier series of video games

== See also ==
- Emile (disambiguation)
- Aemilius (disambiguation)
- Emilio (disambiguation)
- Emílio (disambiguation)
- Emilios (disambiguation)
