= Boizot =

Boizot is a French surname. Notable people with the surname include:

- Louis-Simon Boizot (1743–1809), French sculptor
- Marie-Louise-Adélaïde Boizot (1744–1800), French engraver
- Peter Boizot (1929–2018), English entrepreneur, restaurateur, politician, art collector and philanthropist

== See also ==
- Boisot
