= Marchildon =

Marchildon is a surname. Notable people with the surname include:

- Ananda Marchildon (born 1986), Canadian-Dutch fashion model
- Daniel Marchildon, Canadian writer
- Emile Marchildon (1888–1967), Canadian ice hockey player
- Gilles Marchildon (born 1965), Canadian activist
- Leo Marchildon (born 1962), Canadian composer
- Phil Marchildon (1913–1997), Canadian baseball player
- Thomas Marchildon (1805–1858), Canadian businessman, farmer and politician
