= Pales (disambiguation) =

Pales was an ancient Roman deity of shepherds. Pales may also refer to:

Sciences

- Pales (fly), a genus of flies
- 49 Pales, an asteroid

People

- José María Pales (born 1963), Spanish table tennis player
- Luis Palés Matos (1898–1959), Puerto Rican poet
- Peter Páleš (born 1967), Slovak sprint canoeist
- Emil Páleš (born 1966), Slovak philosopher and scientist
