= Boisot =

Boisot is a surname. Notable people with the surname include:

- Emile Kellogg Boisot (1859–1941), American banker
- Georges Boisot (1774–1853), Chancellor of the Swiss State
- Jean-Baptiste Boisot (1638–1694), French abbot, bibliophile and scholar
- Louis Boisot (1856–1933), American banker
- Max Boisot (1943–2011), British architect and management consultant
