= Emílio =

Emílio is a variant of the given names Emil, Emilio and Emilios, and may refer to:

- Emílio Garrastazu Médici, Brazilian politician
- Emílio Peixe, Brazilian footballer
- Emílio Lino, Portuguese fencer
- Emílio da Silva, footballer
- Emílio Augusto Goeldi, Swiss-Brazilian naturalist and zoologist, also known as Émil Goeldi
- Emílio Henrique Baumgart, Brazilian engineer
- Emílio Costa, Angolan singer known as Don Kikas
