= Emile Janne de Lamare =

French mining engineer

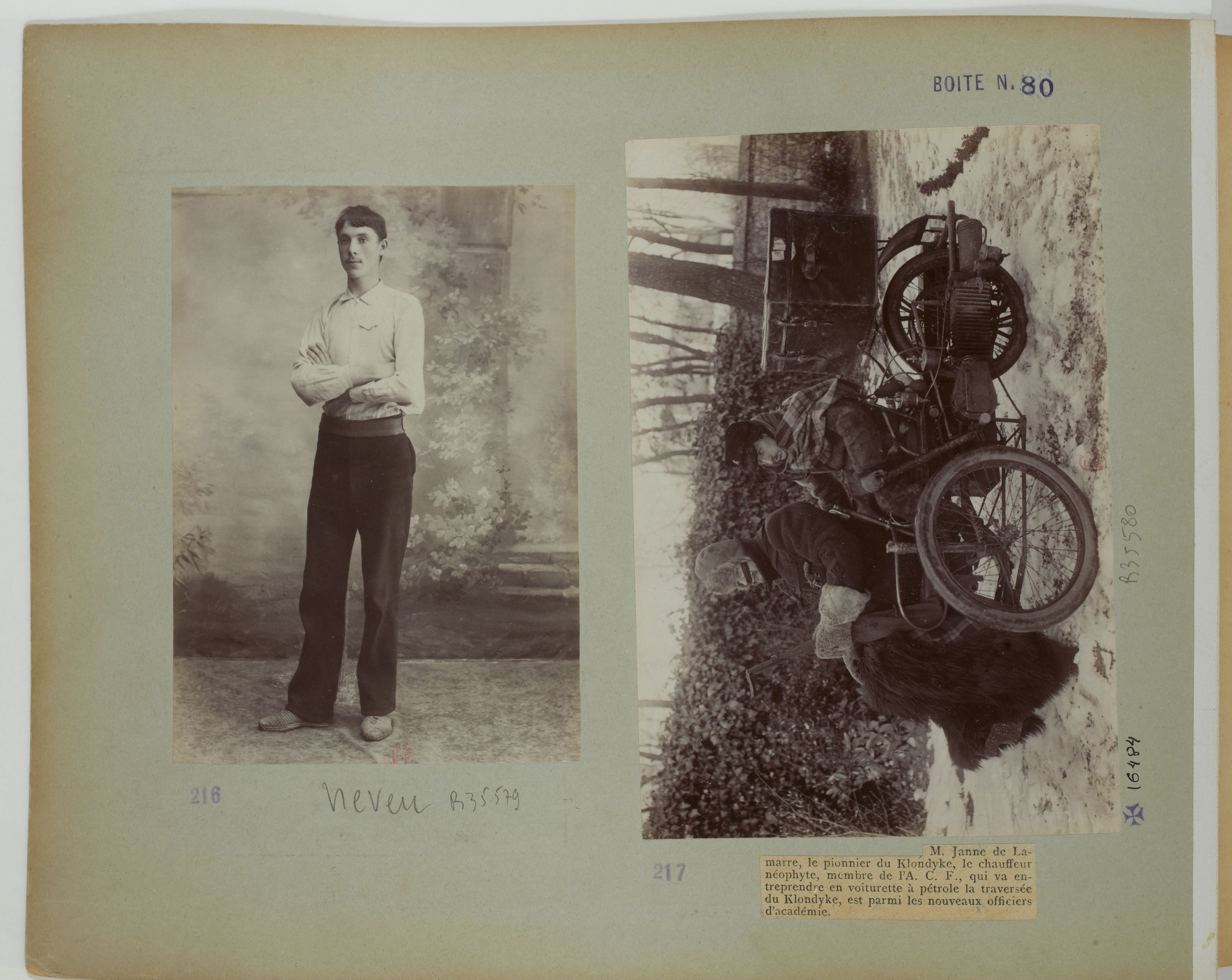
Emile Janne de Lamare photographed by Jules Beau (1899)

Emile Janne de Lamare was a mining engineer, author, and auto enthusiast from Paris, France. He was active mining in British Columbia where an offshoot of the Klondike Gold Rush was taking place in the late 19th and early 20th centuries. He was general manager of the Societe Miniere de la Colombie Britannique in Atlin, British Columbia with the De Lamere Syndicate He was reportedly a count.

He authored Cape Nome Alaska: Gold in the Arctic Circle.
