= Aemilius (disambiguation) =

Aemilius is a synonym for the Gymnetis genus of beetle.

Aemilius may also refer to:

== People ==
- Aemilia gens, gens in ancient Rome Includes list of Ancient Romans named Aemilius
- The Latin form of the given name Emil

=== Non-Romans ===
- Aemilius Irving (1823-1913), Canadian lawyer and politician
- Aemilius Jarvis (1860-1940), Canadian businessman and sailor
- Aemilius Ludwig Richter (1808-1864), German jurist
- Gonzalo Aemilius (born 1979), Uruguayan cleric, secretary to Pope Francis
- Paulus Aemilius Veronensis (c. 1455 – 1529), Italian historian
- Paulus Aemilius (Hebrew scholar) (c. 1510 – 1575), Bavarian Hebrew teacher and bibliographer

== Structures ==
- Pons Aemilius, an ancient Roman bridge
