= Louis Boisot =

American banker (1856–1933)

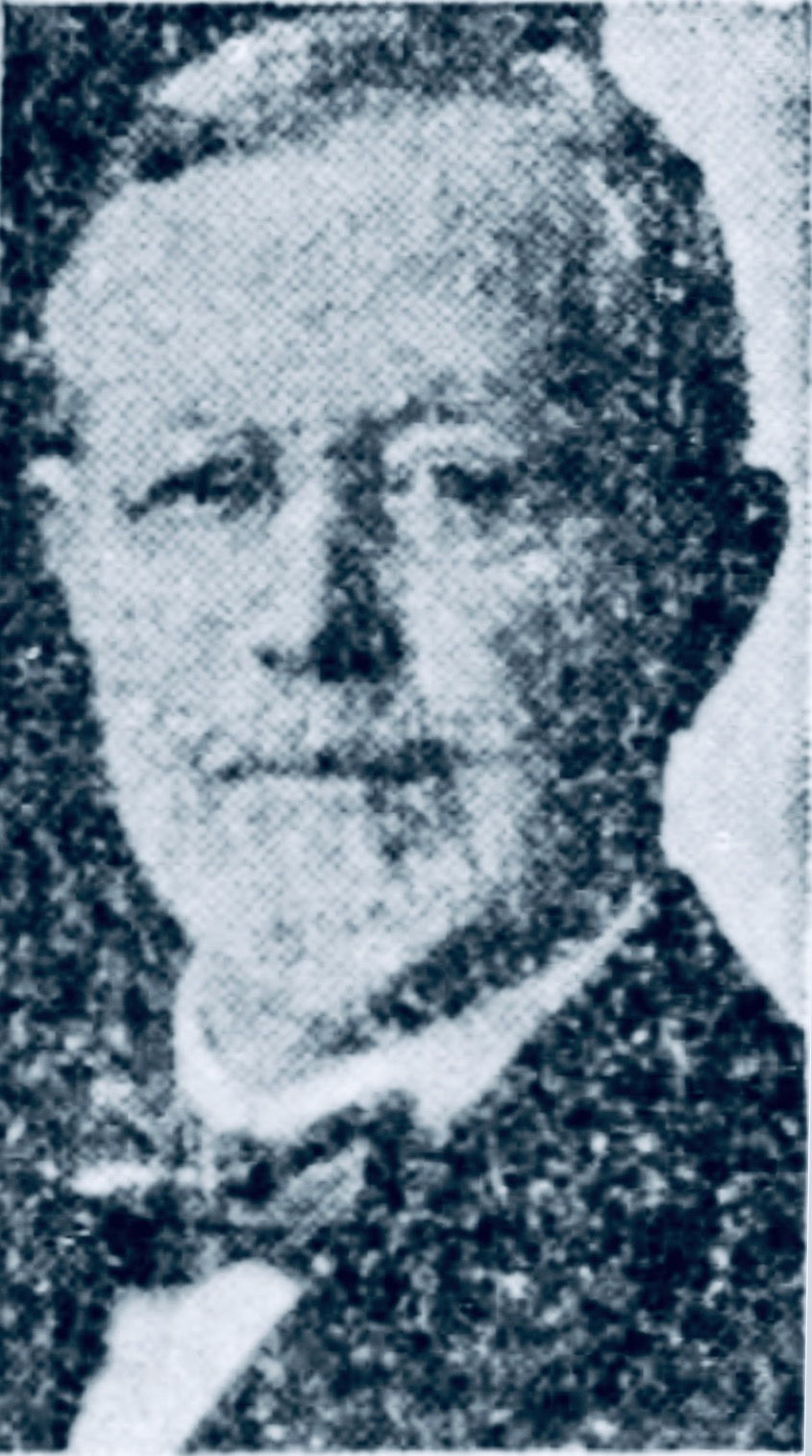
- Boisot in 1925
- Born: May 23, 1856; Dubuque, Iowa, U.S.
- Died: 23 July 1933 (aged 77); Portland, Maine
- Occupations: Banker; author; attorney
- Children: 2

Louis Boisot Jr. (1856–1933) was an American lawyer and Vice President of the First Trust and Savings Bank of Chicago, Illinois. Boisot wrote the books By-laws of Private Corporations and A Treatise on the Law of Mechanics' Liens.

== Early life ==
He got his Bachelor of Laws at Columbia University in 1879 and was admitted to the bar in 1880.

=== Marriage and children ===
Boisot married Mary Spencer on May 13, 1887. He was a member of the La Grange Country Club in Illinois and a prominent churchman.

== Professional life ==
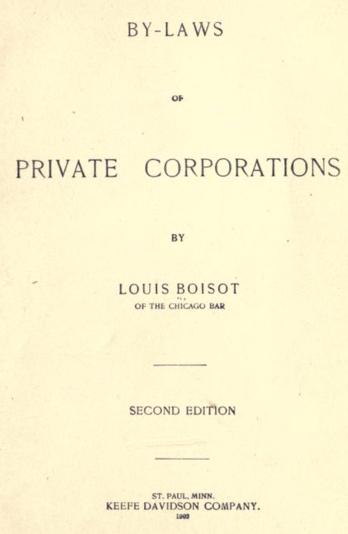
By-laws of Private Corporations, Second Edition, 1902.

Boisot practiced law in Chicago from 1880 to 1903.

On March 26, 1904, Boisot was appointed trust officer of the First National Bank of Chicago. On January 13, 1916, Boisot was appointed vice president, keeping his title of trust officer. He was a director of three other Chicago banks and a trustee of Rollins College. His brother, Emile Kellogg Boisot, was also a banker.

Boisot wrote two books on law, The Law of By-laws of Private Corporations (1892) and Treatise on the Law of Mechanics' Liens (1897). The latter book was reviewed, where it was stated that "a considerable part of the Pennsylvania law, for example, as given by Mr. Boisot, is already ancient history." The review goes on to state: "As a digest of the law on Mechanic's Liens, as it existed at the time of writing, the work is of great value."

In 1922, he was a commissioner to the Presbyterian General Assembly.

== Death ==
On July 23, 1933, Boisot died in Cape Elizabeth, Maine, where he had a summer home. He was buried at the Rosehill Cemetery in Chicago, Cook County, Illinois. He was 77 years old.
