= Emile Obre =

French aviator (1881–1934)

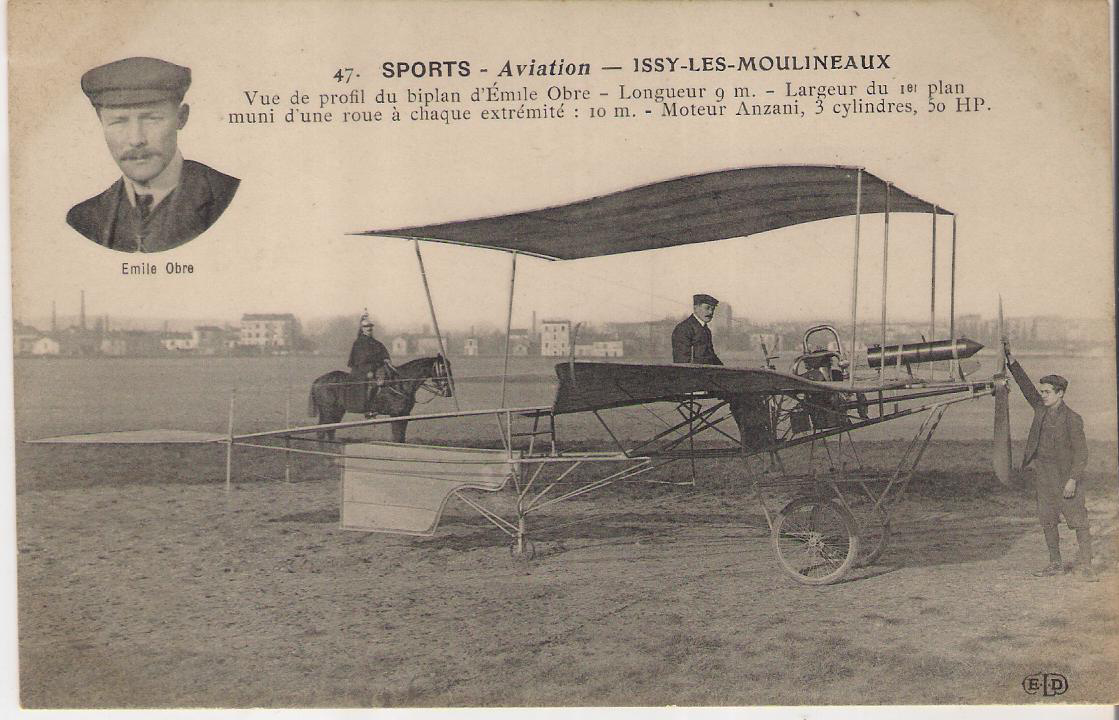
- The airplane Obre built in 1908.
- Occupation: Aviator
- Émile Obre
- Born: July 10, 1881; Le Bourg – Les Lèves-et-Thoumeyragues, 33242, Gironde, Aquitaine, France
- Died: December 9, 1934; Levallois-Perret, 92044, Hauts de Seine, Île-de-France, France
- Occupation: Aviator, aircraft designer, mechanic, aircraft manufacturer

Émile Obre (July 10, 1881 – December 9, 1934) was a French aviator and aircraft designer.

== Biography ==
Émile Obre was born July 10, 1881, in Le Bourg - Les Lèves-et-Thoumeyragues (Gironde). He served as an infantryman in the French Army in 1902. While a mechanic in Morteau (Doubs), he built his first airplane in 1908, and he obtained his pilot's license (no. 148) on June 14, 1910.

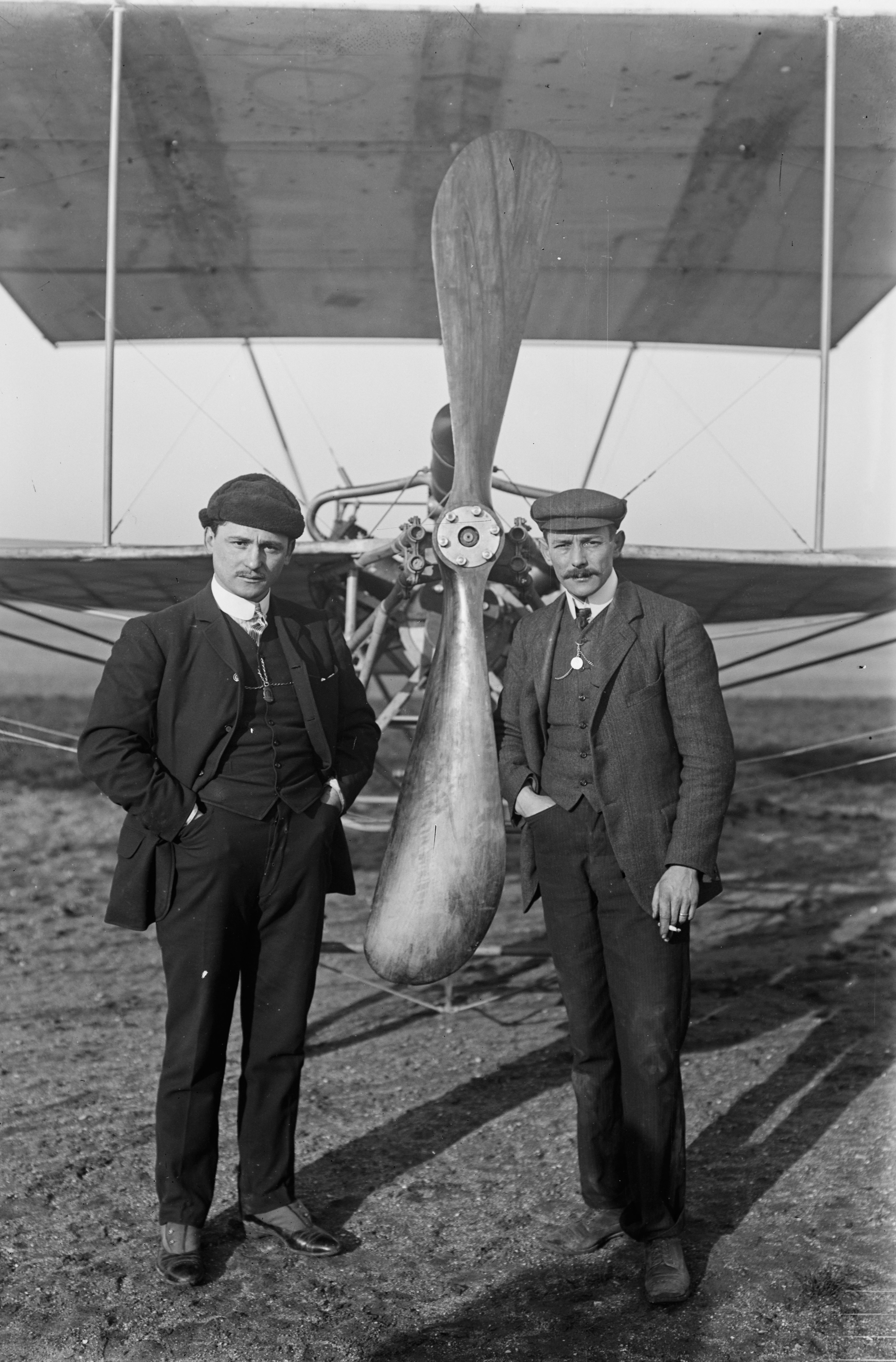
17-1-1909, Emile Obre and Alessandro Anzani in front of Obre's biplane with a 3-cylinder Anzani engine.

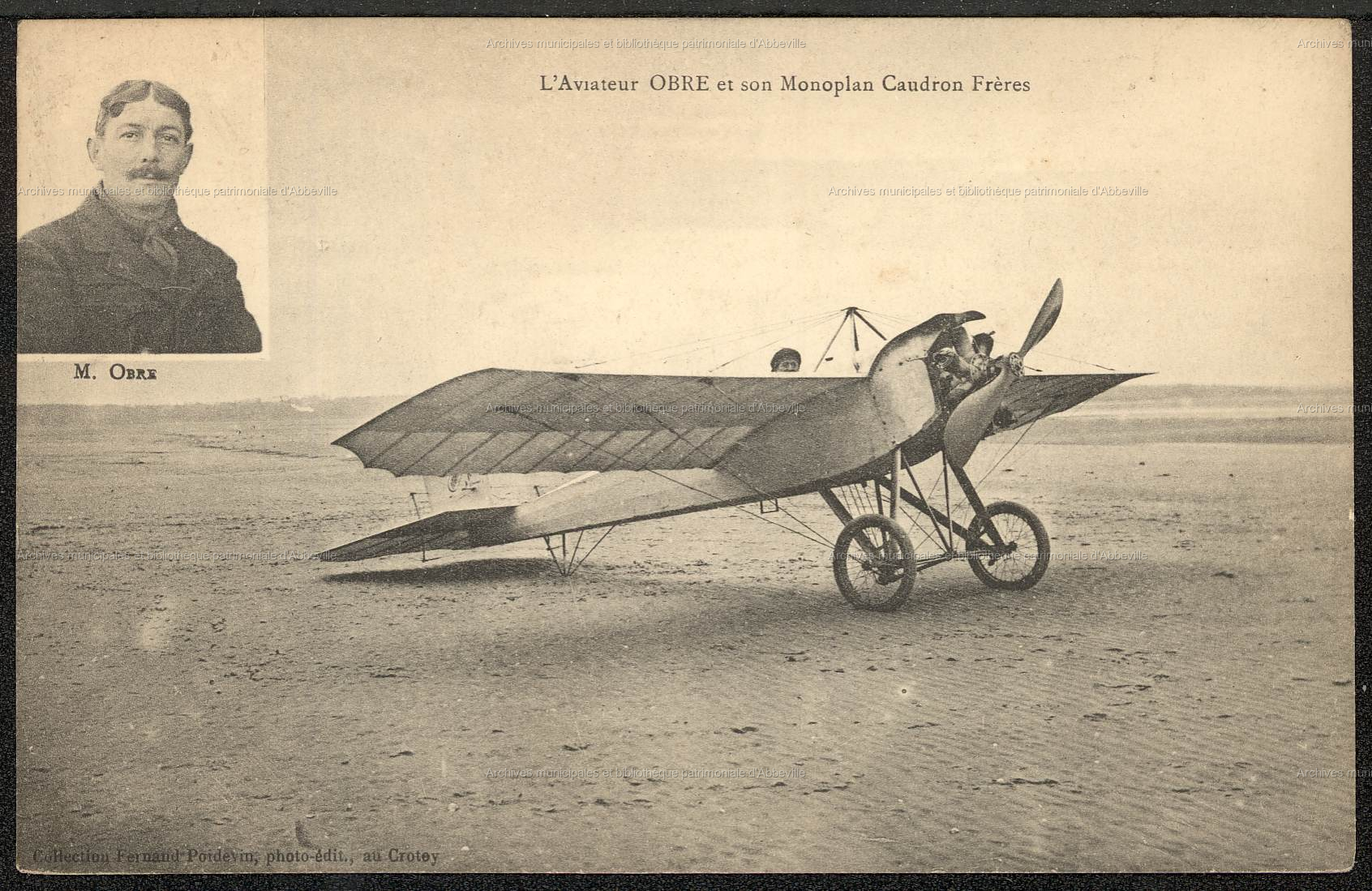
This 1910 photo is thought to have been taken on one of the beaches of the Baie de Somme. It shows Émile Obre in a Caudron M monoplane.

On August 1, 1911, Obre took part in the "Fêtes d'aviation" which took place at the newly created Champirol aerodrome (Loire). In 1911, during the first air festival organized by the company Avia Française at the St. Ponchon racecourse near Carpentras (Vaucluse), Émile Obre and Alfred Liger performed two demonstration flights in front of thousands of spectators.

From December 9 to 11, 1911, at the Campo-Quadrato near Biguglia (Haute-Corse), Obre and Derome dubbed the "Wonderful flying fools" gave the stunned public from all over Corsica at first air show ever organized on the island. This show was part of an aerial tour of the Mediterranean islands.

The two pilots continued with demonstrations in Bastia, Ajaccio, Sardinia, and Sicily. Their aircraft had been dismantled, transported by boat, then reassembled. Émile Obre, and Derome aboard an airplane built by Obre that was equipped with a 50 hp Gnome et Rhône engine, "performed very successful flights in Bastia", according to a specialist magazine.

== Military service ==
In 1913, while working for Caudron went to Beijing to organize a training center as representative of the French colonial forces. During the First World War, he was assigned to the aviation squadron C 39, then to the C 53 where he piloted a Caudron G.4 with the rank of sergeant in 1915.

Squadron C 53 was formed at Fort de Bron in Lyon on May 2, 1915. On May 13, 1915, Colonel Louis Sassary took command. The squadron was assigned to the 1st Army Corps until the end of the war. Sergeant Obre was one of its 8 pilots, 4 observers and 32 mechanics and soldiers of C 53. On the 14th, it was reinforced by 19 men transferred from Squadron C 4. The squadron won 4 confirmed victories and one probable. C 53 suffered 14 killed (11 in combat) and 10 wounded (3 in combat) During the First World War.

== Death ==
Obre died on December 9, 1934, in Levallois-Perret (Hauts de Seine).
