= Jules Vernet =

Jules Vernet (? - 1845) was a 19th-century French dramatist whose plays were presented on the most famous Parisian stages of his time including the Théâtre de la Porte-Saint-Martin, the Théâtre du Vaudeville, the Théâtre des Variétés, and the Théâtre du Palais-Royal.

== Works ==
- 1816: Les jumelles béarnaises, one-act comedy, mingled with couplets, with Émile Cottenet
- 1816: La Magnétismomanie, one-act comedie-foly mingled with couplets
- 1816: Les Rivaux impromptu ["sic"], one-act comedy in prose, mingled with couplets
- 1817: Ni l'un, ni l'autre, tableau villageois, in 1 act, mingled with couplets
- 1818: Une visite à ma tante, ou la Suite des Perroquets, one-act comedy, mingled with couplets, with Armand-François Jouslin de La Salle
- 1819: Le Mûrier, one-act vaudeville
- 1820: Cadet Roussel Troubadour, one-act comedy, with Joseph Aude and Ferdinand Laloue
- 1824: La Jeunesse d'un grand peintre, ou les Artistes à Rome, one-act comedy in prose, mingled with couplets, with W. Lafontaine
- 1825: Belphégor, ou le Bonnet du diable, one-act vaudeville-féerie, with Achille d'Artois and Henri de Saint-Georges
- 1833: Trois têtes dans un bonnet, scenes in episodes and vaudevilles
- 1834: Le Mari, la femme et le voleur, one-act vaudeville, with Adolphe de Leuven

He also was the author of a series of lithographs, with Godefroy Engelmann, dedicated to the actors at the Théâtre des Variétés (1840).

== Bibliography ==
- Joseph Marie Quérard, La France littéraire, ou Dictionnaire bibliographique..., 1839, (p. 120-121)
- Michel Autrand, Le théâtre en France de 1870 à 1914, 2006, (p. 72)
