= Emilios =

Emilios, or Aimilios, (Greek: Αιμίλιος) is a variant of the given names Emil, Emilio and Emílio, and may refer to:

- Aimilios Veakis, Greek actor
- Aimilios Papathanasiou, Greek sailor
- Emilios T. Harlaftis, Greek astrophysicist
- Emilios Hatjoullis, British cartoonist and graphic designer
- Emilios Ionas, Greek soccer association president
- Emilios Kyrou, Greek-born Australian judge
- Emilios Panayiotou, Cypriot footballer
- Emilios Riadis, Greek composer

== See also ==
- Emilio (disambiguation)
