= Gueules cassées =

French expression

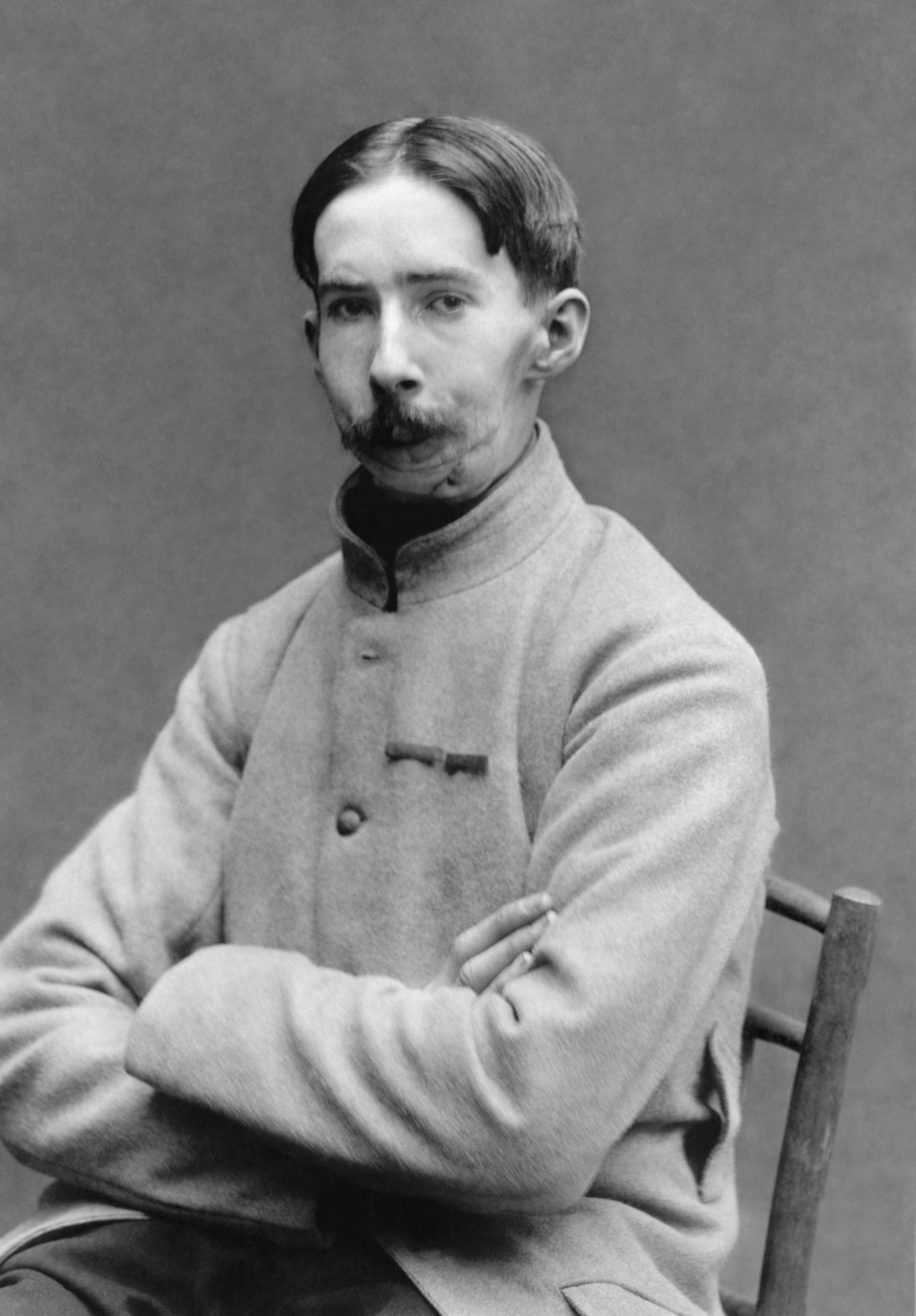
A mutilated French soldier after WW I

Gueules cassées (broken faces) is a French expression for facially disfigured servicemen that originated in World War I. Colonel Yves Picot is said to have coined the term when he was refused entry to a gathering for those disabled from the war.

== Background ==
Trench warfare protected the bodies but left the heads exposed. The introduction of the steel helmet in 1915 made head injuries more 'survivable', but this reduction of mortality meant a mutilated life for thousands.

At the start of the war those wounded to the head were generally not considered able to survive and they would not usually be 'helped first'. This changed in the course of the war, as progress was made in medical practices like oral and maxillofacial surgery and most notably in the new field of plastic surgery. Surgeons conducted experiments with bone, cartilage and tissue transplants and the likes of Hippolyte Morestin, Harold Gillies and Léon Dufourmentel made enormous advances. Because of the experimental character of this surgery some chose to remain as they were and others could just not be helped yet. Some of the latter were helped by all kinds of new prosthetics to make them look more or less 'normal', which spawned the new scientific discipline of anaplastology.

== Gueules cassées ==
An estimated 4.2 million French were wounded, some 300,000 of whom were classified as 'mutilated'. Of those about 15,000 can be called gueules cassées. Right after the war, the facially disfigured were not considered disabled war veterans and exempt from support and veterans' benefits, but that changed later. In 1921, the Union des Blessés de la Face et de la tête (Association of Those Wounded in the Face and the Head) was formed. Colonel Picot was one of its founders and later president of the association. It still exists, currently under the name Gueules Cassées with slogan sourire quand même ("smiling nonetheless").

== In film ==
- J'accuse! (1938), Abel Gance. The film features actual mutilated veterans.
- Johnny Got His Gun (1971), Dalton Trumbo
- Chariots of Fire (1981)
- The Officers' Ward (2001), François Dupeyron
- See You Up There (2017), Albert Dupontel
- Amsterdam (2022)

Music Diamanda Galás Broken Gargoyles: an oratorio for voices, strings, synthesizers, and percussion based upon the poetry of Georg Heym and Ernst Friedrich

== See also ==
- Roger E. Brunschwig, co-founder of the Union des Blessés de la Face et de la tête
