= Émile Beaussire =

French politician (1824–1889)

Émile Beaussire (26 May 1824, Luçon – 28 May 1889) was a French republican politician and a philosopher. He was a member of the National Assembly from 1871 to 1876 and of the Chamber of Deputies from 1876 to 1877 and from 1879 to 1881. He belonged to the Centre gauche parliamentary group.
