= Emile B. De Sauzé =

French-born American university teacher (1878–1964)

Émile Bials De Sauzé (Tours, December 7, 1878 – July 10, 1964) was a French born naturalized-American language educator who developed the Cleveland Plan for teaching foreign languages. He is credited with originating the conversational method where students hear a teacher speak a word, then write it, then speak it. This method replaced the older method of simply memorizing words and grammar.

Born in Tours, France, he graduated from the University of Poitiers in 1900. He married Melanie Phillips of Pennsylvania in 1903 and came to the U.S. in 1905. They had one daughter, Marcelle. He received his doctorate degree from Saint Joseph College in 1907.

His career included heading the modern language department at Temple University and the French Department at the University of Pennsylvania prior to 1918. While teaching at both schools he became affiliated with the Sigma Pi chapters at each and was initiated into the organization. He then became director of foreign languages for the Cleveland Public Schools in Ohio from 1918 to 1949.

Upon arriving in Cleveland he founded the Maison Française de Cleveland. Members of the group met once a month where guest lecturers would speak on French literature and culture.

De Sauzé took the time to train the district's teachers in his method which contributed to its success. He insisted that they participate in the activities of the Maison Française. He worked with Western Reserve University to set up a laboratory school for children in first grade through high school where language courses were taught in the target languages. Teaching students were required to spend time observing in the school to learn the methods being taught there.

In 1922, he began one of the few foreign language programs in elementary schools in the United States.

While in Ohio he also taught at Western Reserve University. After retirement he taught summer sessions at Laval University in Quebec until 1959.

De Sauzé wrote fifteen French text books, one of which became the official text book of the United Nations for teaching French.

The Emile B. De Sauzé Elementary School in Cleveland was named for him.
