= Émile Chaline =

French Navy admiral (1922–2020)

- Born: 22 February 1922; Brest, France
- Died: 16 May 2020 (aged 98)
- Occupation: Admiral

Émile Jean Chaline (French pronunciation: [emil ʒɑ̃ ʃalin]; 22 February 1922 – 16 May 2020) was a French admiral and member of the French Resistance. A member of the Free French Naval Forces, he served his career with the French Navy at the rank of squadron vice-admiral.

== Biography ==
The son of Émile Chaline and Jeanne Le Saint, Chaline completed his secondary education at the Lycée de Brest. He graduated from the École Navale as an engineer, and then enrolled at the Royal Naval College, Dartmouth in 1940.

Chaline joined the Free French Naval Forces on 1 July 1940 with the help of his uncle, Charles Chaline. He took part in the Battle of the Atlantic aboard the Léopard and was part of the Normandy landings in June 1944.

After World War II, Chaline was deputy to the head of the military cabinet of Prime Minister Georges Pompidou, and then was chief of the private staff of Pompidou as President. He then served as First Commander of the Naval Training Center in Saint-Mandrier-sur-Mer. His rule at the school was nicknamed "Chalingrad" for his strictness. He was appointed Naval Attaché to the United States in 1974.

Chaline served as Maritime Prefect of Cherbourg-Octeville from 1979 to 1980. From 1988 to 2010, he chaired the Association of Free French Naval Forces.

Émile Chaline died on 16 May 2020 at the age of 98. Admiral Christophe Prazuck, Chief of Staff of the French Navy, paid tribute to him via Twitter.

== Decorations ==
- Grand Cross of the Legion of Honour
- Grand Officer of the Ordre national du Mérite
- Croix de Guerre 1939-1945
- Croix de guerre des théâtres d'opérations extérieures
- Escapees' Medal
- Officer of the Ordre du Mérite Maritime
- Cross of the resistance volunteer combatant
- Commander of the Order of the Black Star
- Officer of the Order of Ouissam Alaouite
- Officer of the Order pro Merito Melitensi
- Commander of the Order of the Dannebrog

== Works ==
- Historique des Forces navales françaises libres (1990)
