= Emil Krupa-Krupinsky =

German painter

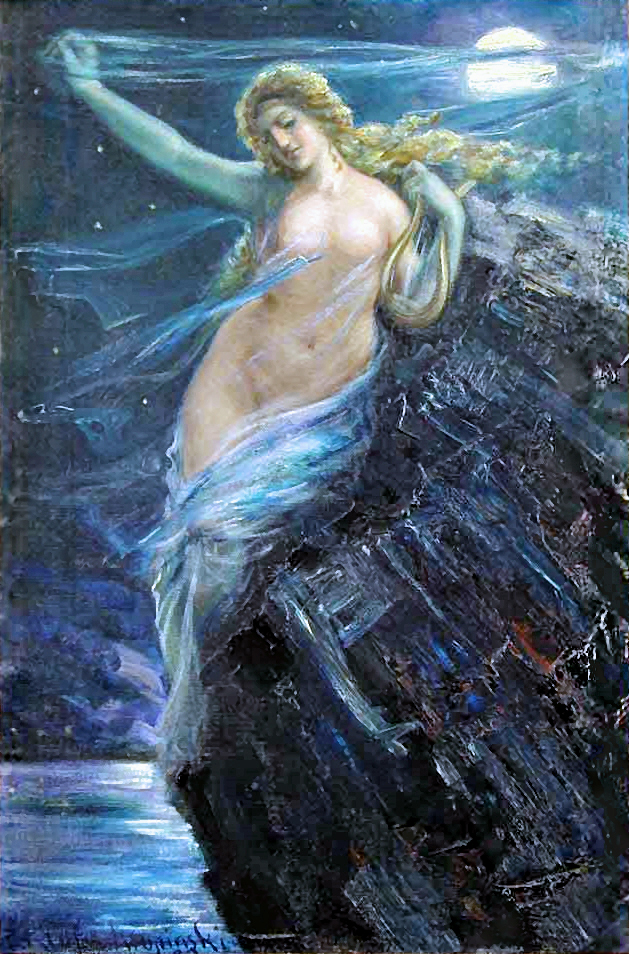
Loreley (1899)

Emil Krupa-Krupinsky (Krupinski) (10 March 1872, Barmen - 28 May 1924, Bonn) was a German portrait painter, genre painter and graphic artist.

== Biography ==
He studied at the Kunstakademie Düsseldorf under Eduard von Gebhardt and Fritz Roeber. Eugen Kampf influenced him. He was also a member of the artists' association "Malkasten" and later co-founded the Bonner Kunstverein.

His most famous image is the "Loreley" (1899), which has been widely reproduced in print. It is now in the City Museum Trier. His paintings were often published as postcards. He was also active as a commercial artist.

During World War I he served in Lauenburg Rifle Battalion No.9. For them, he painted their position on the Hartmannsweilerkopf - a souvenir picture that was later hung in the Ratzeburg officers' mess. During the war he also provided illustrations for war propaganda postcards.

His son, August (according to other sources Alfons), also studied at the Düsseldorf Art Academy but rejected painting and devoted himself to photography.
