= Émile Renouf =

French painter

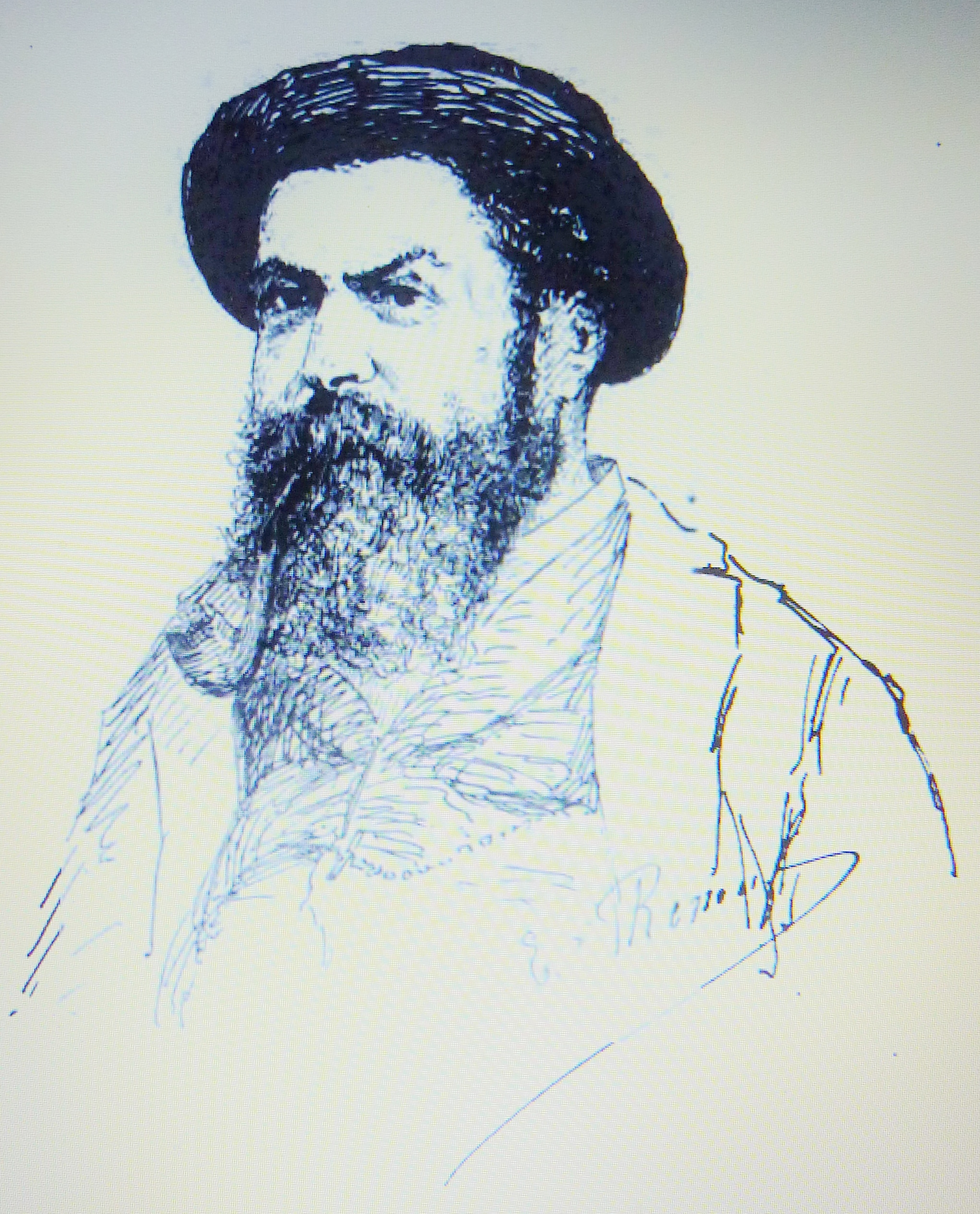
- Émile Renouf, selfportrait
- Born: 23 June 1845
- Died: 4 May 1894 (aged 48)
- Occupation: Painter

Émile Renouf (23 June 1845 – 4 May 1894) was a French painter and draughtsman of the realism-impressionism school.

He studied at the Académie Julian and was a pupil of Gustave Boulanger, Jules Lefebvre and Charles Duran, and first exhibited his works at the Salon de peinture et de sculpture in Paris between 1877 and 1881. He received a gold medal at the Exposition Universelle (1889) in Paris.

He painted marine and peasant themes especially after a trip to the Île de Sein. Because of the state of his Paris studio, he built a new atelier in Le Havre where he died. His works are in museums in France, Amiens, Le Havre, Rouen, Liège and the Metropolitan Museum of Art in New York City.

== Major works ==
- Environs de Honfleur, printemps, 1870
- Environs de Honfleur, le soir, 1875
- Aux environs de Honfleur, l'hiver, 1877
- Maison du Haut-du-Vent, à l'embouchure de la Seine, 1878
- Lit de rivière dans un vallon, 1878, oil on canvas
- La veuve de l'Île de Sein, 1880, Musée des beaux-arts de Quimper
- Un coup de main or La main tendue (The Helping Hand), 1881
- Après un orage, 1881
- Soleil couchant, 1884
- Un loup de mer, 1885
- En dérive, 1886
- Fin du jour, 1886
- Les guetteurs, 1889
- Le pont de Brookling, 1889
- Pique-nique dans un parc
- Bord de rivière, oil on canvas transferred to wood
- Personnages sur la plage, oil on canvas
- Bord de plage, oil on canvas
- Sur la montre (between 1880 and 1890) (inspired a work by George Emerick Essig)
- Après la pluie, 1876
- Soleil couchant, 1876
- Une vallée dans le Finistère, 1877
- Un sauvetage, 1883
- Le pilote (Der Looste), 1883
- Paysage (ruisseau) (Musée des beaux-arts de Liège)
- Le canal d'Harfleur, 1892
- Dernier radoub, gravure, 1885
- La partie de pêche, 1892
- Chutes du Niagara, 1893

== Examples of his work ==
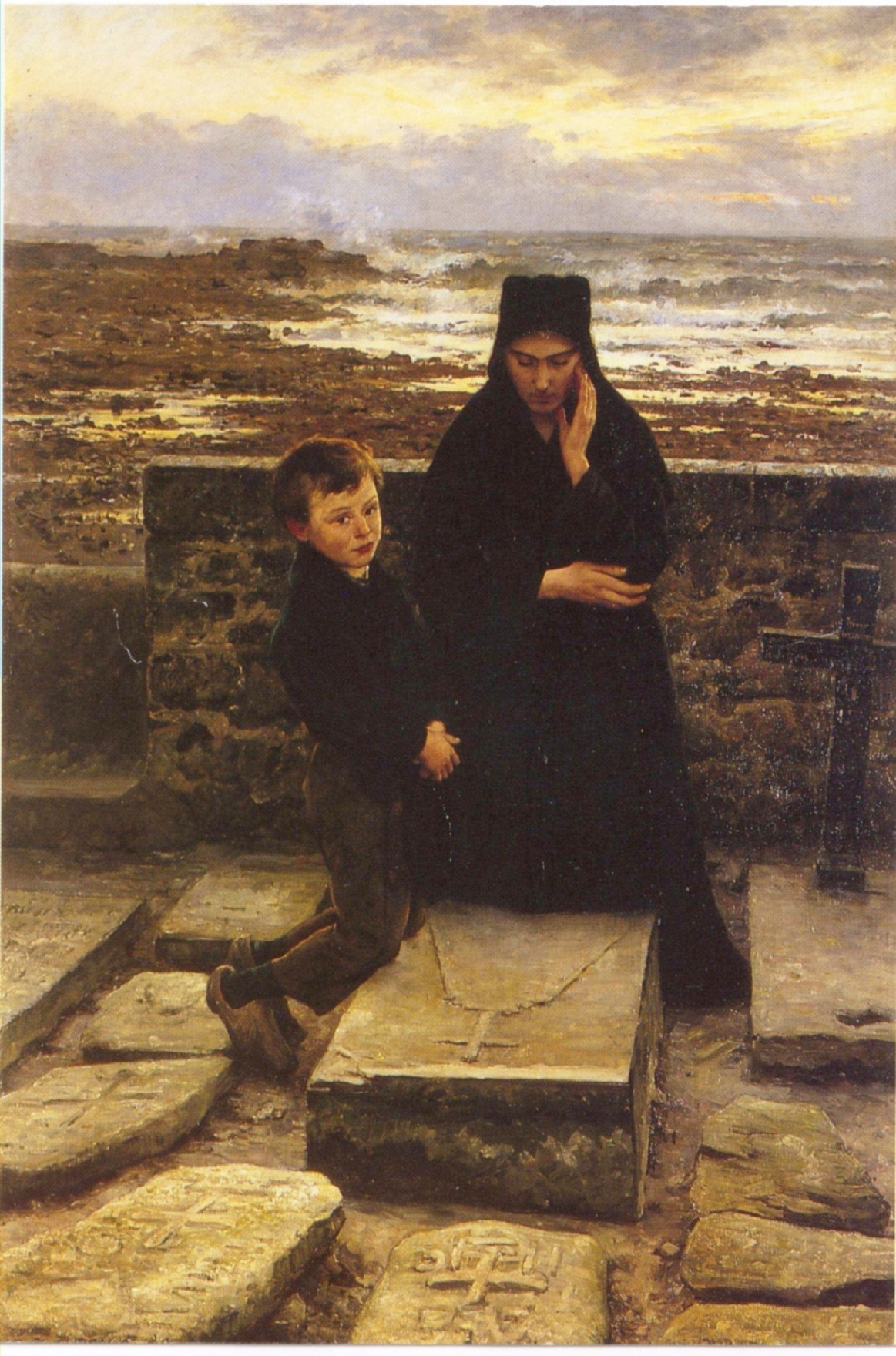
La veuve de l'Île de Sein

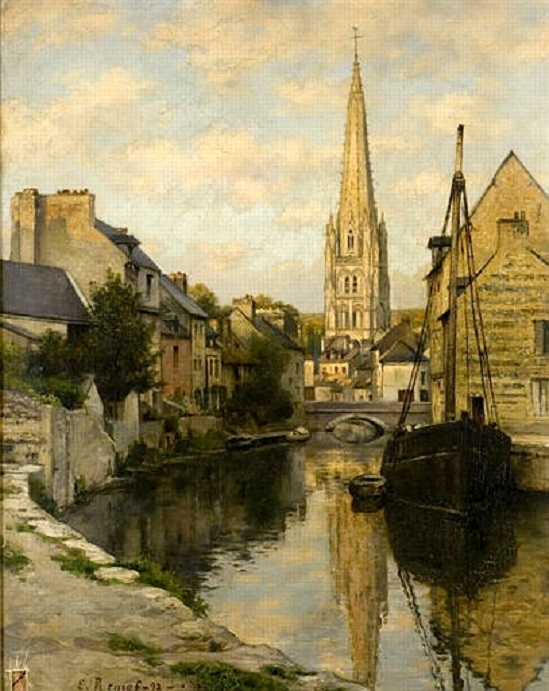
Le canal d'Harfleur (1892)

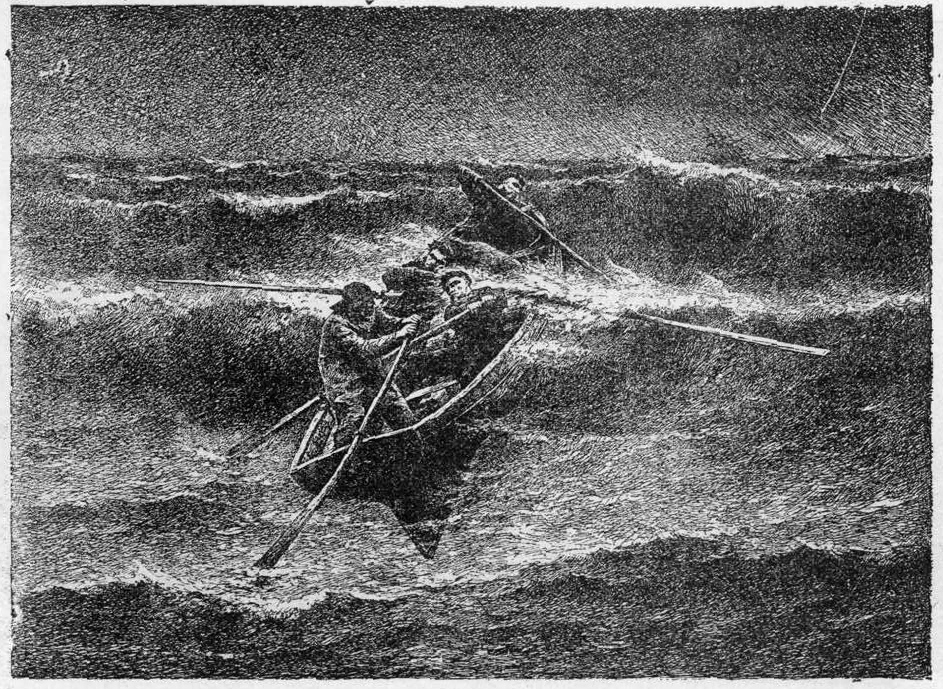
Der Lootse (1883)

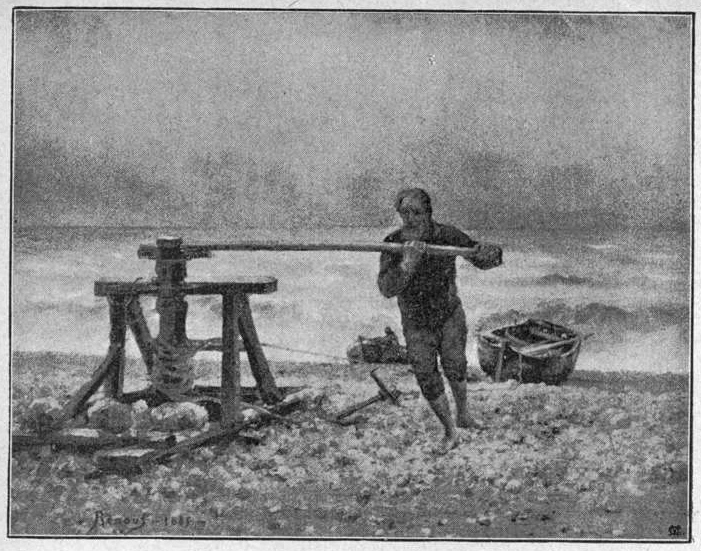
An der Ankerwinde (1883)

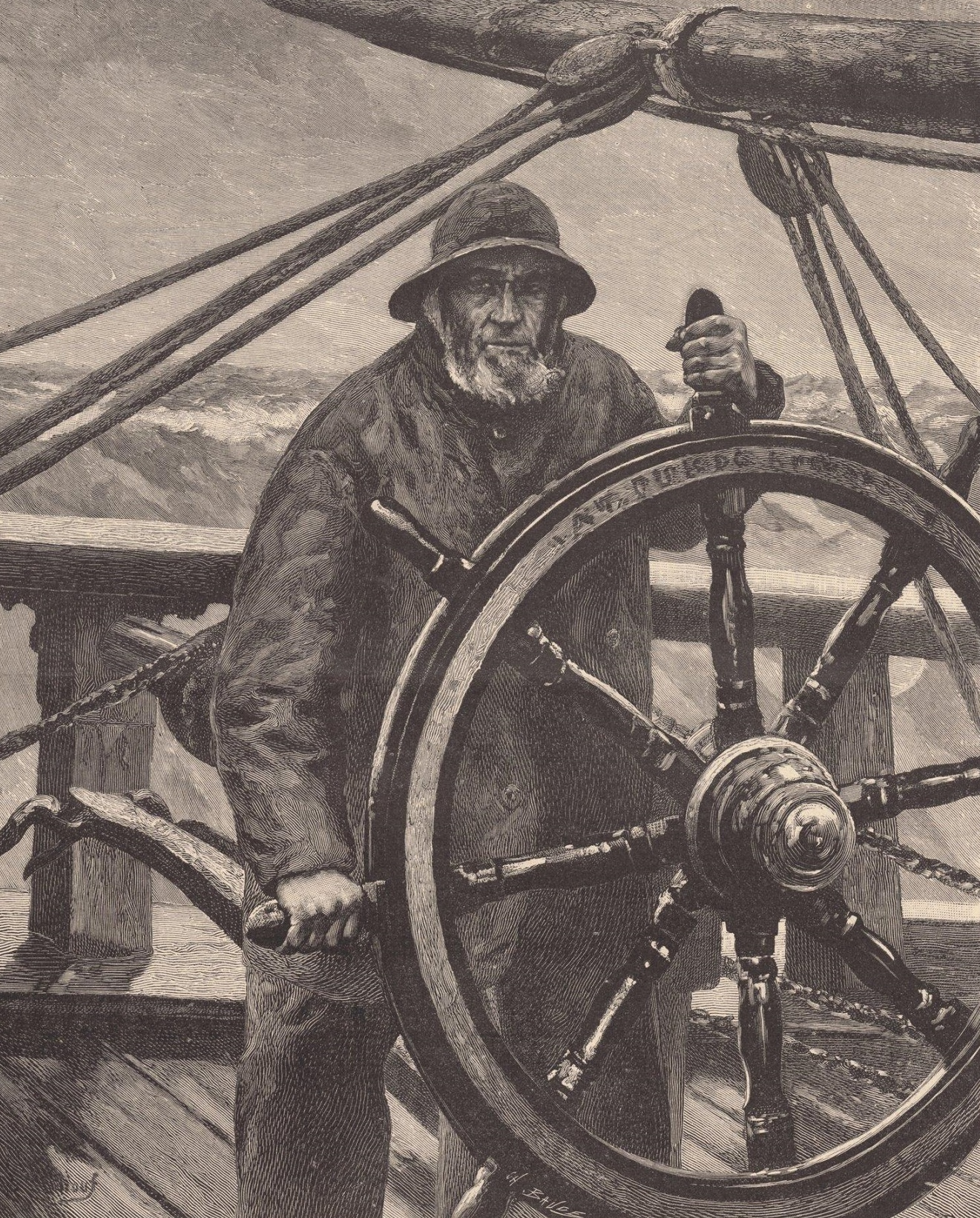
Un loup de mer (1885)

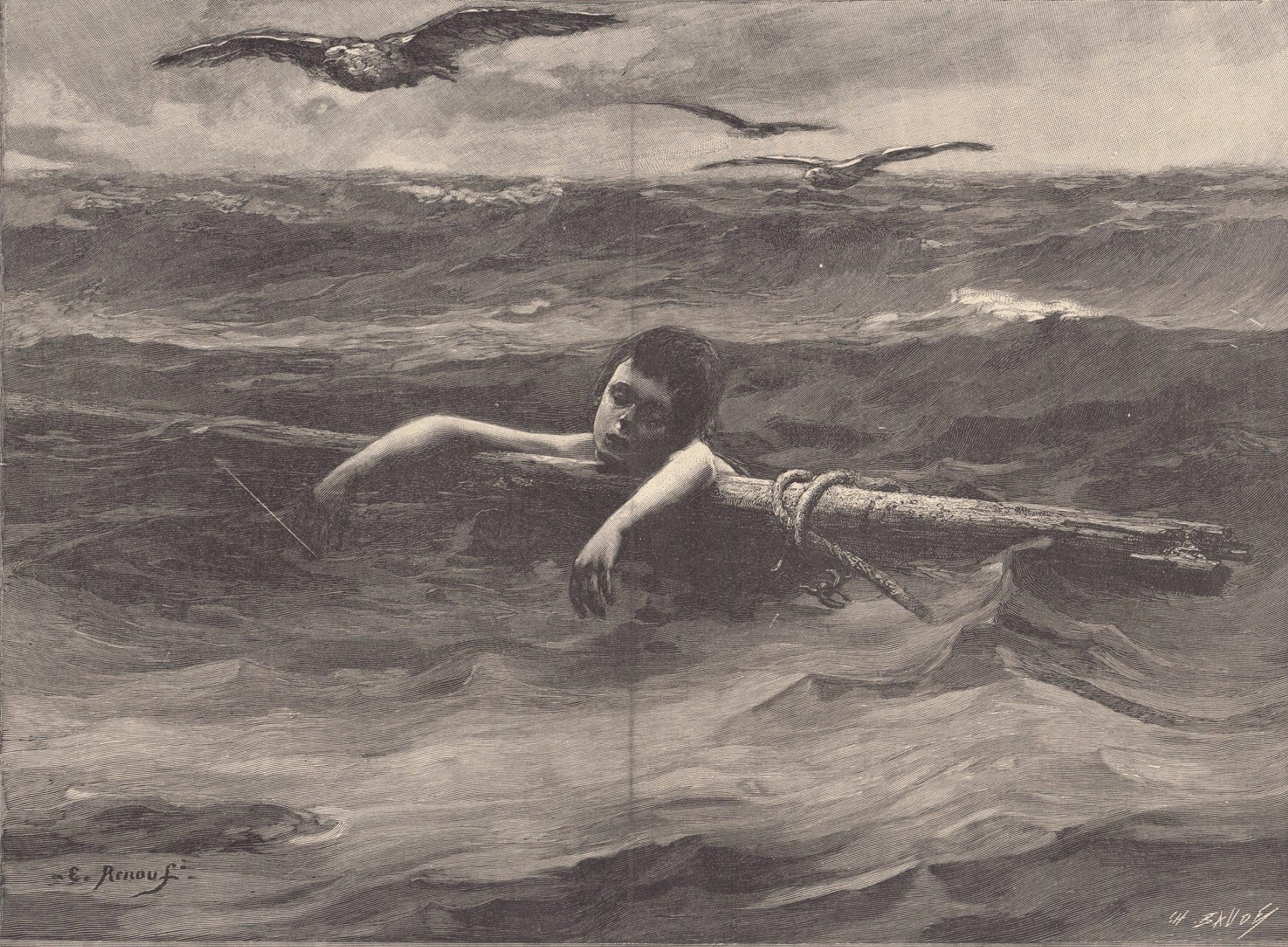
En dérive (1886)

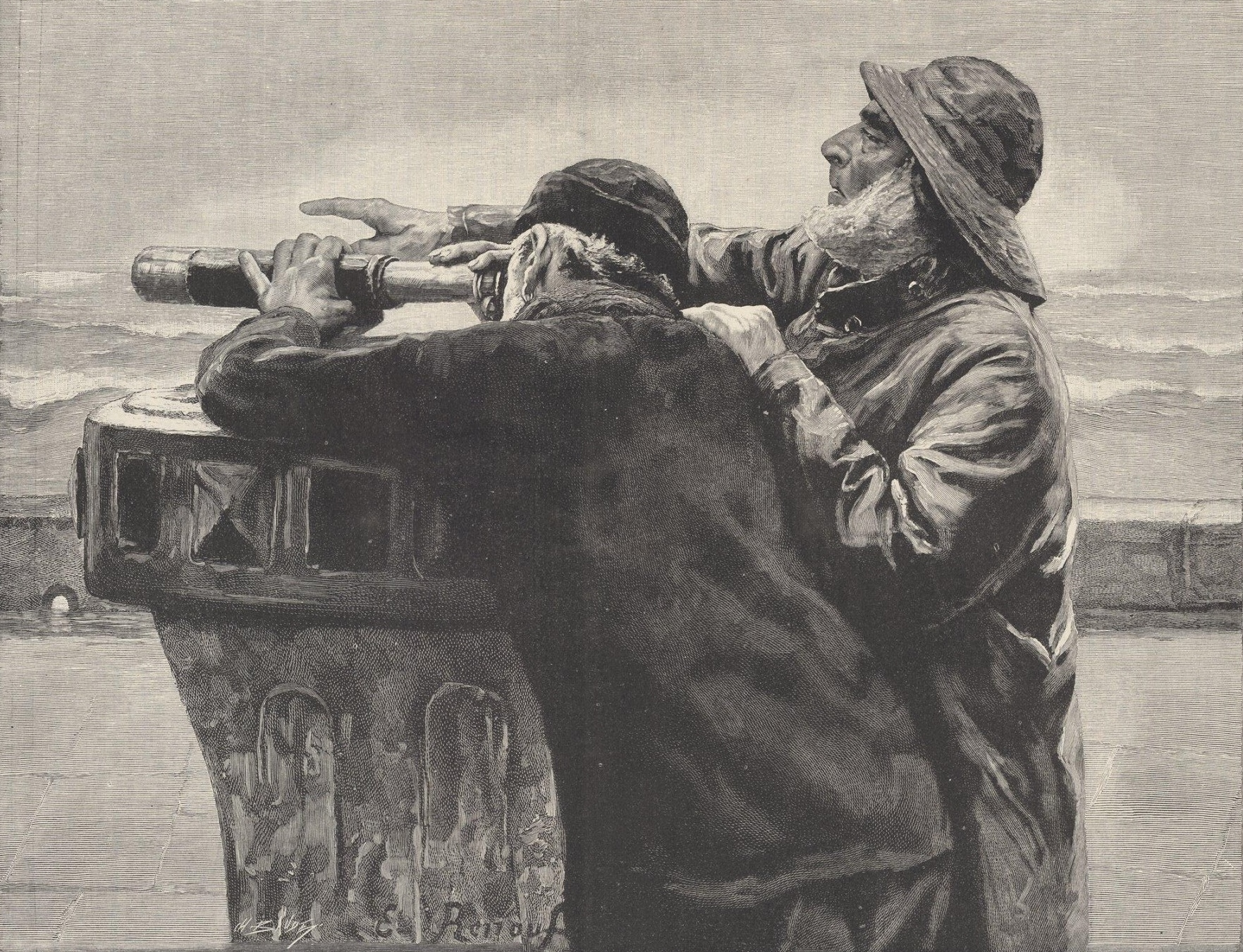
Les guetteurs (1889)

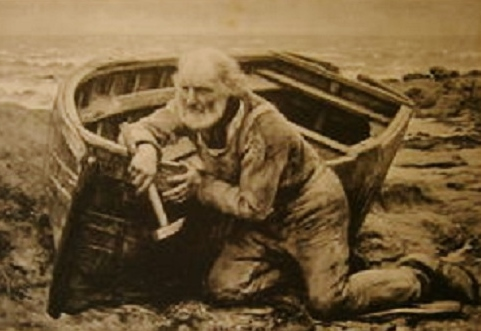
Dernier radoub, gravure

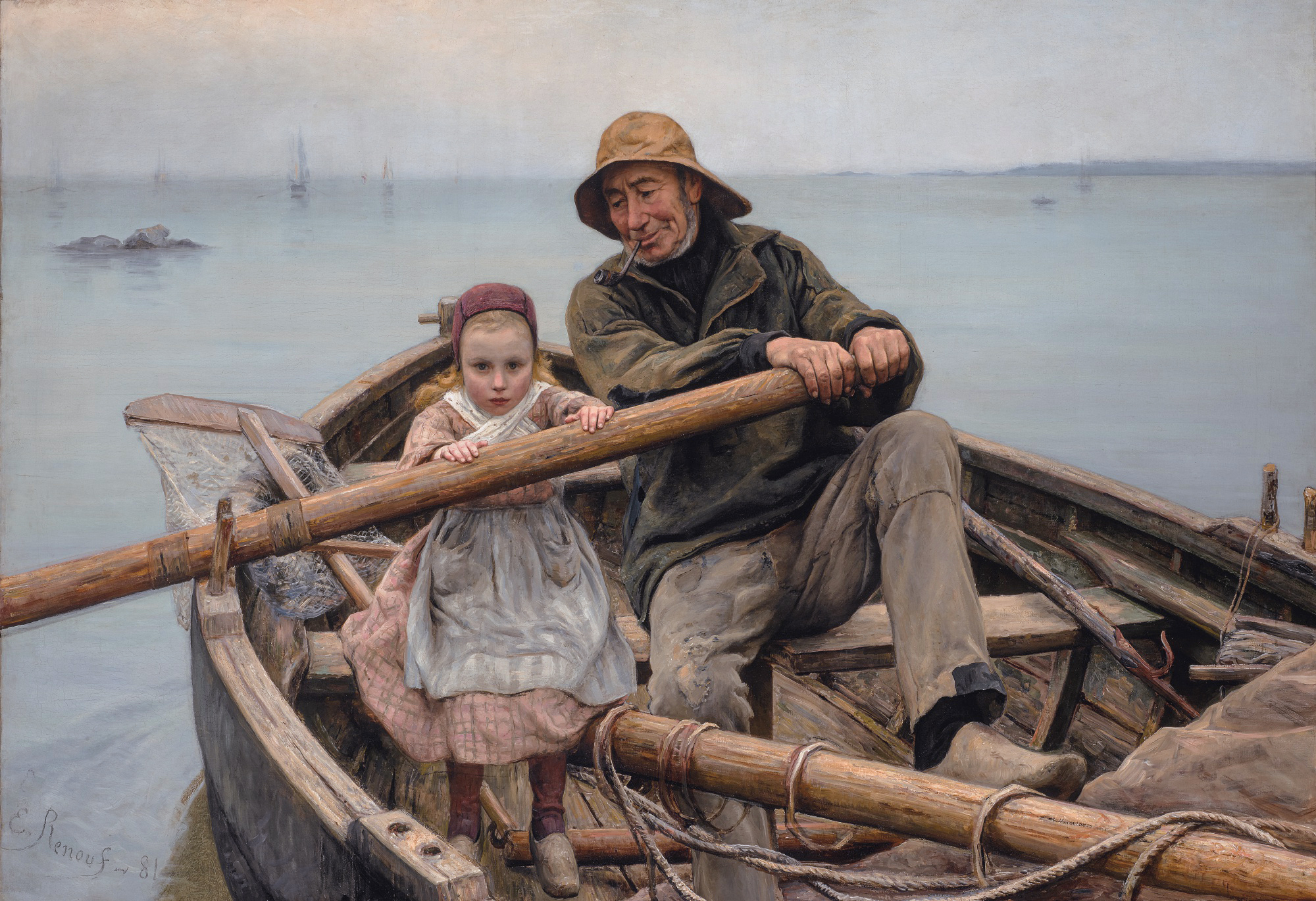
La main tendue (1881)
