= Les Lèves-et-Thoumeyragues =

- Commune
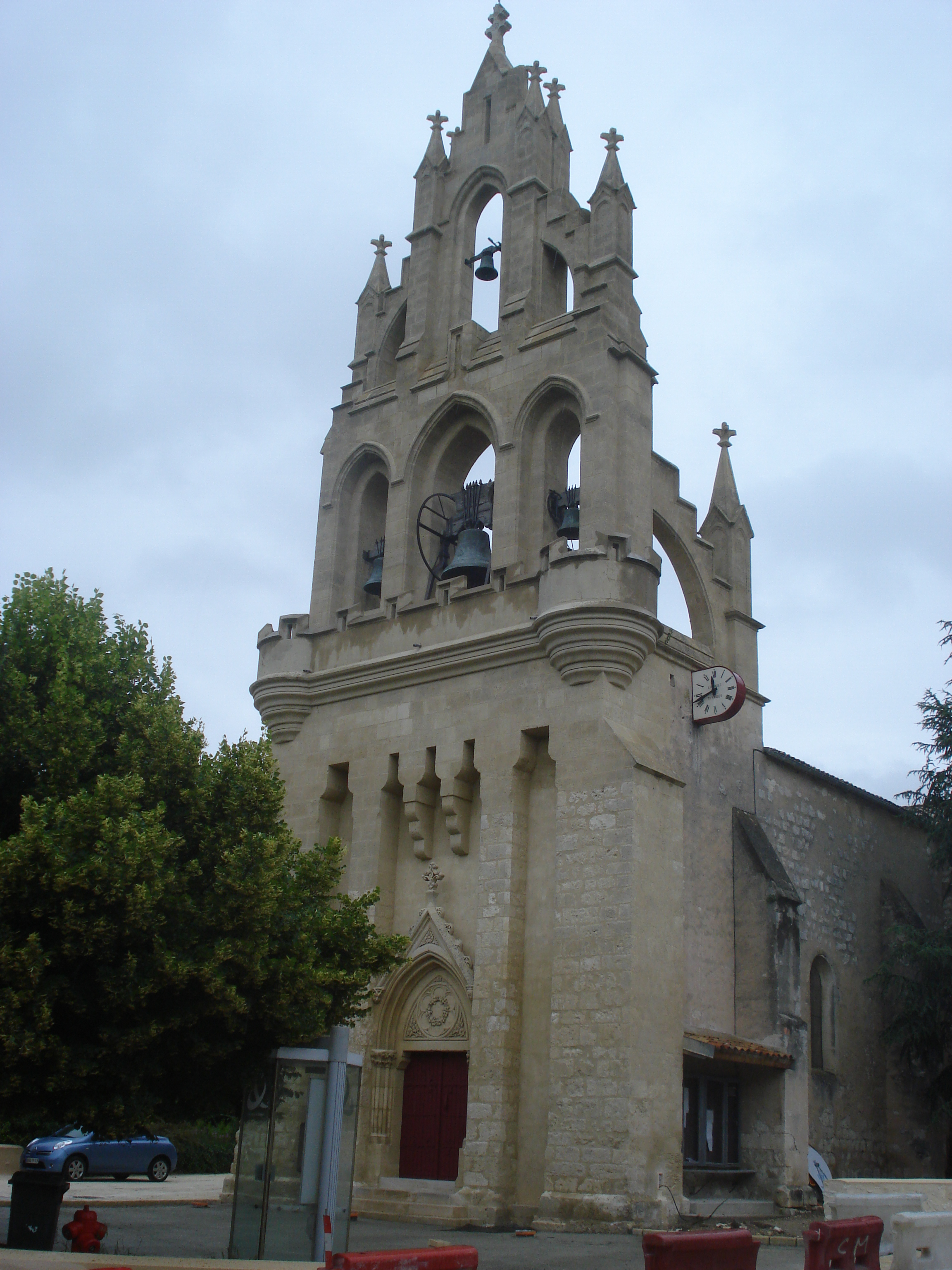
- The church in Les Lèves
- Location of Les Lèves-et-Thoumeyragues
- Location within France Location within Nouvelle-Aquitaine
- Coordinates: 44°47′38″N 0°10′32″E
- Country: France
- Region: Nouvelle-Aquitaine
- Department: Gironde
- Arrondissement: Libourne
- Canton: Le Réolais et Les Bastides
- Intercommunality: Pays Foyen

Government
  - Mayor (2023–2026): Alain Piroux
- Area^{1}: 15.58 km^{2} (6.02 sq mi)
- Elevation: 80 m (260 ft)
- Highest elevation: 126 m (413 ft)
- Lowest elevation: 30 m (98 ft)
- Population (2023): 561
  - Density: 36.0/km^{2} (93.3/sq mi)
- Time zone: UTC+01:00 (CET)
  - Summer (DST): UTC+02:00 (CEST)
- INSEE/Postal code: 33242 /33220
- ^{1} French Land Register data, which excludes lakes, ponds, glaciers > 1 km^{2} (0.386 sq mi or 247 acres) and river estuaries.

Les Lèves-et-Thoumeyragues (French pronunciation: [le lɛv e tumejʁaɡ]; Occitan: Las Luèvias e Tomeiragas) is a commune in the Gironde department in Nouvelle-Aquitaine in southwestern France. It is sometimes referred to as Les Lèves.

== Geography ==
The closest town is Sainte-Foy-la-Grande.

== Population ==
Historical population
Year	Pop.	±% p.a.
1968	669	—
1975	599	−1.57%
1982	555	−1.08%
1990	503	−1.22%
1999	543	+0.85%
2007	534	−0.21%
2012	546	+0.45%
2017	557	+0.40%
2023	561	+0.12%
Source: INSEE

== Wine ==
Les Lèves-et-Thoumeyragues is in the heart of the easternmost wine growing commune within the Bordeaux appellation. Univitis which is the largest group of wine producers in Bordeaux and southwestern France, is based in the village. Univitis owns most of the vineyards around the village, and in size makes up half of the commune.

There are also a number of independent wine producers based in the village, such as Chateau La Tour de Chollet.

== See also ==
- Communes of the Gironde department
- Bordeaux wine
