= Émile Colinus =

French painter and illustrator

- Born: 17 November 1884; Paris, France
- Died: 18 August 1966 (aged 81); Paris, France
- Known for: Painting

Émile Colinus (born 1884 in Paris, died 1966 in Paris), was a French painter and illustrator.

== Biography ==
Colinus first studied at the Académie de Montmartre under the leadership of André Lhote, with whom he learned how to simplify forms. The paintings he shows at the Salon des Indépendants from 1925 synthesize the heritage of Fernand Cormon and André Lhote in a personal way.

Colinus married Renée Unik, who was a painter as well. Having studied with Jules Adler and Georges Berges at the Académie Julian she was a specialist of portrait paintings. The couple didn't travel far but in 1931 they went to the shore of the Mediterranean where Colinus painted a landscape that he would later exhibit at the Salon des Indépendants the same year. In 1956 Colinus spent all summer in Martel, Lot, in a villa with a garden where he painted a portrait of his wife seated behind her easel.

He died in Paris on 18 August 1966.

== Works in public institutions ==
- Museum of Martel (Lot)
