= Emilio =

Emilio may refer to:

- Emilio Navaira, a Mexican-American singer often called "Emilio"
- Emilio (given name)
- Emilio (film), a 2008 film by Kim Jorgensen

== See also ==
- Emílio (disambiguation)
- Emilios (disambiguation)
