= Emil Fischer (cartographer) =

American cartographer

Emil B. Fischer (1838 or 1839 in Dresden, Saxony – September 23, 1898 in Silverton, Colorado) published six detailed maps of the San Juan area of southwestern Colorado between 1883 and 1898. A surveyor's son, he came to America around 1872. He moved to Durango in 1880 when the building of the Denver & Rio Grande Railway to the San Juan attracted widespread attention, then to Silverton. These maps aided silver and gold prospectors to file their claims; they enabled investors to locate mines and view their proximity to famous neighboring mines; and they encouraged tourists to visit the depicted mining regions and invigorate the local economies.

This German immigrant made many mountain-climbing pilgrimages for his drawings of San Juan and adjacent counties, which he subsequently transferred to maps that were as attractive as they were functional. Fischer drew his finished maps, even the text elements, entirely by hand before engraving and printing, distinguishing them from the typeset variety that came before and after. They are scrupulously correct in detail and were regarded as authoritative for many years. The complex terrain of the San Juan area, characterized by precipitous peaks ranging from 11,000 to 14,000 feet, rugged passes, deep gorges, alpine valleys, and glacial basins, rendered accurate maps indispensable for miners and created a niche for this cartographer.

Following are descriptions of Fischer's six maps:

1. 1883, “Map of the San Juan Mining Districts.” It includes insets with plats of the towns of Durango, Silverton, and Rico. The scale is one inch to three miles.

2. 1886, “Map of Red Mountain and the Mining Region of San Juan, Ouray, San Miguel and Dolores Counties.” A small inset shows the system of wagon roads connecting the towns of Telluride and Ouray with Montrose. The scale is one inch to one mile.

3. 1891, “Map of Red Mountain and the Mining Region of San Juan, Ouray, San Miguel and Dolores Counties,” intended to update its predecessor with the identical name and scale. Inset plats focus on these three mining locales: Newman Hill at Rico, the Red Mountain Area north of Silverton, and Silver Lake in Arrastra Basin, east of Silverton. The map shows the locations of hundreds of the San Juan Region's named mines and placers and may constitute a comprehensive compilation.

4. 1893, “Map of Southwestern Colorado.” The scale is one inch to four miles. It covers the huge expanse of this part of the state as well as northwestern New Mexico and southeastern Utah. Insets portray plats of Durango, southwestern Colorado's California Mining District, and the Needle Mountain Mines between Durango and Silverton, as well as the network of railroad systems reaching Durango from Cheyenne, Denver, Salt Lake City, Albuquerque, and Phoenix.

5. 1894, “Map of the Mineral Section of San Miguel County,” attached to a booklet published by the Telluride Board of Trade, based on his 1891 map, showing this county only with the scale of one inch to one mile.

6. 1898, “The Principal Mining Section of San Juan County.” This map updates Fischer's 1891 map, but smaller in scope, with a superlative scale of one and a half inches to one mile.

Fischer produced these six maps, except the 1894 and possibly the 1898, as “pocket maps,” i.e., they came folded and packaged in printed enclosures for safe, easy transport.

The public may view originals of these maps at a number of locations in the U.S., principally in Colorado. The Denver Public Library houses all six. Other locations include the Colorado School of Mines, Colorado College, Fort Lewis College, University of Colorado-Denver, Pike's Peak Library District, San Juan County Historical Society Archives, Yale University, Columbia University-City of New York, Brigham Young University, the University of Nevada-Reno, University of Illinois at Urbana-Champaign, Southern Methodist University, Autry Institute for the Study of the American West, and the Library of Congress.

Fischer's artistic gifts bore fruit through his paintings and sketches as well as his maps. The most famous, painted in 1895, depicts Francis Marion Snowden's cabin, the first in Baker's Park, where Silverton now stands. In 2013 the San Juan County Historical Society acquired this painting for its Silverton museum.

In late-2014, color images of Fischer's six maps, his 1895 painting, and his grave marker will be available on the Mining History Association's website: www.mininghistoryassociation.org.

Emil B. Fischer died September 23, 1898, at the age of 59, of “paralysis of the heart.” He collapsed on the sidewalk in front of the First National Bank of Silverton, where he had just transacted business. Reportedly his only known survivor was a sister in Dresden.

Although the details of his decline are poorly documented, it appears Emil Fischer died alone and relatively poor despite his notable abilities. His six maps and his paintings showcase the rich mining history of the San Juan. Unlike the maps of his predecessors, contemporaries, or the USGS that followed, his combined aesthetic flair with accurate cartography, making his work unique and creating a market for it more than a century after he died. California rare-map dealer Barry Ruderman recently sold one of his 1893 maps for $6,500.
