= Émile Van Arenbergh =

Belgian magistrate, poet and biographer

Émile Van Arenbergh (1854–1934) was a Belgian magistrate, poet and biographer.

== Life ==
Van Arenbergh was born in Leuven on 15 May 1854 and studied law at the Catholic University of Leuven. While a student he wrote for La Semaine des étudiants, getting to know Emile Verhaeren, Iwan Gilkin and Albert Giraud.

After graduating he served as a magistrate in turn in Diest, Anderlecht and Ixelles, and contributed to Edmond Picard's Pandectes belges and to Le Journal des Tribunaux. He further contributed more than 400 articles to the Biographie Nationale de Belgique, and was the author of biographies of Don John of Austria and Charles V. As a writer he was best known as a poet, part of the circle of La Jeune Belgique. In 1921 he was elected to the Académie royale de langue et de littérature françaises de Belgique. He died in Ixelles on 3 January 1934.

== Works ==
- Médailles (Paris and Brussels, 1921)
