= Emile Lahure =

Luxembourgish footballer (born 1947)

Personal information
- Date of birth: 26 November 1947 (age 78)
- Position: Defender

Senior career*
Years	Team	Apps	(Gls)
1975–1980	Progrès Niederkorn		

International career
1975	Luxembourg	2	(0)
- * Club domestic league appearances and goals

Emile Lahure (born 26 November 1947) is a retired Luxembourgish football defender.
