= Emile Detiege =

American politician (born c. 1840)

Emile Detiège (born c. 1840) was a sheriff and state legislator in Louisiana. He served in the Louisiana Senate from 1874 to 1876. He represented St. Martin Parish.

Eric Foner documented him as a French speaking "quadroon" born to a family of jewelers. He was a 1st Lieutenant and organizer of Company C, 1st Louisiana Native Guard that became known as the 73rd U.S. Colored Infantry. He campaigned for Black suffrage and after an unsuccessful campaign in 1868 served as a customs inspector. He won office to the Louisiana Senate from 1874 to 1876 and Louisiana House from 1877 to 1880.

== See also ==
- African American officeholders from the end of the Civil War until before 1900
