= Émile Beaussier =

French painter (1874–1943)

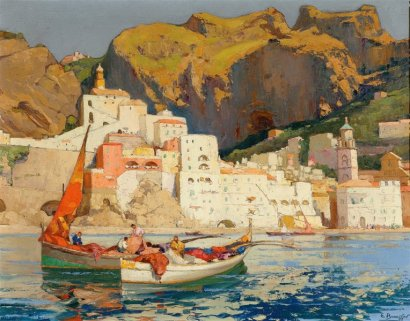
The Port of Amalfi in 1932

Émile-Marius Beaussier (31 December 1874 – 18 October 1943) was a French painter known primarily for maritime scenes and sunny landscapes.

== Biography ==
He was born in Avignon. He began his artistic training at the École nationale supérieure des beaux-arts de Lyon, from 1889 to 1894, then went to Paris, where he studied with Jean-Paul Laurens at the Académie Julian.

He served as a Professor in Lyon from 1906 to 1922 and was a member of the Société Lyonnaise des Beaux-arts; serving as its President from 1937 to 1939. He was also a member of the Société des artistes français.

After 1892, he presented most of his works at the Salon de Lyon and exhibited in Paris after 1925. His favorite subjects were sunny, seaside villages in southern France, Italy and Spain. He also designed posters, painted watercolors, and created portraits using the trois crayons technique.

One of his favorite spots to paint was the small fishing port of Martigues, nicknamed the "Venice of Provence", which was also a favorite spot for his friend Félix Ziem.

In 1896, he married Julie-Marie Wuiot. The marriage was childless and they divorced in 1917.

Beaussier died in Lyon in 1943.
