= Saint-Émile =

Saint-Émile or Saint-Emile can mean:

- Saint Emile was martyred in Carthage in the mid-third century and his feast day is May 22.
- Saint-Émile, Quebec City, a former city in central Quebec, Canada, now amalgamated into Quebec City
- Saint-Émile-de-Suffolk, Quebec, a municipality in the Outaouais region of Quebec, Canada
- Saint Emile Island
