= Émile Napoléon Baumann =

French horticulturalist

- Born: 1835
- Died: 1910 (aged 74–75)
- Scientific career
- Fields: Horticulture

Émile Napoléon Baumann (1835–1910) was a French horticulturalist.
