= Broussais Coman Beck =

American anti-union businessperson

- Born: August 29, 1886; Walla Walla, Washington, U.S.
- Died: August 7, 1936 (aged 49); Seattle, Washington, U.S.
- Occupation: Businessman

Broussais Coman Beck (1886-1936) was a Seattle businessperson and Bon Marche manager who played a notable role in the use of aggressive tactics to disrupt the efforts of labor unions and activists during the 1919 Seattle General Strike, in particular, employing labor spies to obtain advance information on planned actions. Beck also contributed to developing rowing as a recognized sport at the University of Washington, as well as helping to introduce the sport at Yale University and University of California.
