= Emile Guebehi =

Ivoirian sculptor (1937–2008)

Emile Guebehi (1937–2008) was a sculptor from Nekede, Nigeria, best known as the "Master of Nekede." He worked and died in Abidjan, Ivory Coast. His artworks are part of The Jean Pigozzi Collection of African Art and The Museum of Fine Arts, Houston. Guebehi's work has been shown in major metropolitan museums around the world, including the Hood Museum of Art and the Musée du quai Branly.

== Biography ==
Emile Guebehi was a self-taught artist who worked a series of manual labor jobs around Nigeria before becoming a sculptor. In his thirties, he returned to his native village of Nekede where a local healer convinced him to focus on creating art, and even commissioned a wooden figurine for use in his consultations. Guebehi worked with various mediums including clay and coal, and he occasionally fashioned cement figures for tombs. However, he dedicated himself mostly to wood carving. He was based in the capital of the Ivory Coast, Abidjan, although as his popularity grew, the Tchaman or Ebrié people offered to settle him in the village of Songon-Dagbé after the village and the village prefect were impressed with his art presentation. The Ebrié Lagoon commissioned art for age-grade ceremonies, dance groups, and for families organizing gold displays, and the "Feast of Generations". He was one of the first Ivorian artists who modernized Ebrié Lagoon anthropomorphic sculptures to more realistic portrayals of unclothed African women.

Guebehi introduced his brother, Nicolás Damas, to his own method of polychrome wood sculpture. They often collaborated in creating large multicolored scenes representing the characters, animals, objects related to the daily life, the history of the population, the origin of the Ebriés and their initiation rites.

== Artworks ==
- Untitled (Adultery Scene), 1991
- Untitled (Bar Scene), 1991
- Untitled (Musician's Scene), 1991
- Standing Man with a Record Album, 1999
- Dancing Woman, 1999

== Exhibitions ==
=== Group exhibitions ===
Black Womanhood: Images, Icons, and Ideologies of the African Body

- Curated by Barabara Thompson, the exhibition displayed at the Hood Museum of Art on the campus of Dartmouth College surveyed the historical construction of stereotypes concerning the black female body, such as the erotic harem slave, the maternal mammy, and the hyper-sexualized black woman.

Clubs of Bamako

- The Museum of Fine Arts, Houston and the Rice University Moody Center for the Arts collaborated in curating the Club of Bamako. An exhibition of sixteen black and white photographs of the nightclub scene in Bamako, Mali, in the 1960s and 1970s are shown with eleven life-size sculptures featuring two Emile Guebehi sculptures: Dancing Woman and Standing Man with a Record Album.

Masters of Sculpture from Ivory Coast

- The Jean Pigozzi Collection of African art lent the Musée du quai Branly Emile Guebehi's and Nicolas Damas' Untitled (Adultery Scene) sculpture to [shed] light on the unique and diverse styles created by older regional groups and today's "transnational" African artists.

Magical Africa – Masks and Sculptures from Ivory Coast

- The exhibition is a touring exhibition featuring forty-nine artists, spanning from the nineteenth to the twenty-first century, who have developed art in the Ivory Coast. Together the masks and sculptures – most made of wood, some of ivory – will astound the viewer with the power and authenticity of African sculpting tradition.
