= Émile Cottenet =

French playwright (1785–1833)

Émile Cottenet (1785 in Lyon - 1833 in Paris) was a 19th-century French actor, chansonnier and playwright. He arrived in Paris around 1815 and became an actor for the Théâtre de la Porte-Saint-Martin before he worked for the troupe of the Théâtre du Gymnase. His plays have been performed on the most important Parisian stages of the 19th century : Théâtre de la Porte-Saint-Martin, Théâtre du Vaudeville, Théâtre de la Gaîté, etc.

== Works ==
- 1810: Le petit Saint Jean ou La vente publique
- 1813: Dumollet à Lyon, ou Bêtise sur bêtise, folie-vaudeville in 1 act
- 1816: Le Bateau à vapeur, comedy in 1 act, mingled with couplets, with Pierre-Frédéric-Adolphe Carmouche
- 1816: Les Jumelles béarnaises, comedy in 1 act, mingled with couplets, with Jules Vernet
- 1816: Les Poissons d'avril, ou le Charivari, amorce in 1 act, mingled with vaudevilles, with Carmouche
- 1817: Est-ce une fille ? est-ce un garçon ?, à-propos vaudeville in 1 act, on the occasion of the happy delivery of her highness Mme la duchesse de Berry
- 1817: La Fête du Béarnais, à-propos in 1 act, mingled with vaudevilles, on the occasion of the king's day, with Charles Hubert
- 1817: L'Heureuse nouvelle, ou le Premier arrivé, à-propos in 1 act, mingled with vaudevilles
- 1817: La Mascaradomanie ou la Petite revue, scènes épisodiques mingled with vaudevilles
- 1817: Le Soldat et le courtisan, ou l'Auberge du Point-du-Jour, comédie en vaudevilles in 1 act in prose
- 1820: Tristesse et gaîté, ou les Deux noces, vaudeville in 1 act, with Hubert
- 1821: Patapan à la représentation de Jeanne d'Arc à Feydeau, pot-pourri written under his dictation
- 1821: Les Trébuchets, folie villageoise, mingled with couplets
- 1821: Patapan, ex-tambour de l'armée d'Espagne, à la représentation de l'Attaque du convoi, pot-pourri mingled with fights, dances, evolutions, ballets, etc.
- 1826: Arlequin, le dentiste et son compère, parade in 4 acts
- 1827: Athènes, ou les Grecs d'aujourd'hui, tragedy in 3 parts in verses
- 1830: L'Alarme des rois
- undated : Boutade, devinez à qui ?

== Bibliography ==
- Salvador Jean Baptiste Tuffet, Les mystères des théâtres de Paris, 1844, p. 151-152
- Henry Lyonnet, Dictionnaire des comédiens français, 1911, p. 7
