= Emile Wennekes =

Dutch musicologist (born 1963)

Emile [Emmanuel Gerhardus Johannes] Wennekes born July 19, 1963, Doetinchem, is a Dutch musicologist, Full Professor at Utrecht University for the Chair: Music and Media.

== Career ==
Before his academic career, Wennekes previously worked as a music critic for the Dutch dailies NRC Handelsblad (1995–1999) and de Volkskrant (1999–2000). He was also artistic advisor (Centrum Nederlandse Muziek and subsequently MuziekGroep Nederland: 1999–2004), and orchestral programmer for Dutch public radio (2000–2002) before intensifying his academic career.

Wennekes is a graduate of Utrecht University and received his Ph.D. in 1999, with a thesis entitled Het Paleis voor Volksvlijt (1864–1929): ‘edele uiting eener stoute gedachte!’ / The Amsterdam Crystal Palace (1864–1929): ‘Noble Expression of an Audacious Notion' In 2000, he was named part-time Full Professor at Utrecht University for the Endowed Chair: Post-1600 Dutch Music History, as successor to Prof. Dr. Rokus de Groot. In 2004, his appointment as (full-time) Full Professor followed. Wennekes has collaborated on repositioning Utrecht's Musicology Department (established 1930) within the newly created Department of Media and Culture Studies into a research institute with an emphasis on Music and Media, augmenting the traditional focus on Music History. From 2006 to 2011, he served as the first Head of School of the Media and Culture Studies department.

== Research and publications ==
Wennekes has published on a broad range of subjects which include a biography of the conductor Bernard Haitink (co-published with historian Jan Bank), the reception of the music of Bach, Liszt, Mahler and Mozart, music within Second Life, John Williams, Willem Mengelberg, conductor films, soundtracks, Vitaphone shorts, jazz and rock documentaries and films, and contemporary music in the Netherlands (including a book co-published with Mark Delaere which is available in six languages).

Wennekes was editor of several periodicals and books, among them:

- Key Notes: Musical Life in the Netherlands;
- Dutch Journal for Musicology;
- Muziek & Wetenschap and
- Een muziekgeschiedenis der Nederlanden.
- Çinema Changes: Incorporations of Jazz in the Film Soundtrack. (Co-editor: Emilio Audissino).

He has published in the leading musicological encyclopedias, including The New Grove Dictionary of Music and Musicians and Die Musik in Geschichte und Gegenwart.

Wennekes's present research focuses on two areas: mediatizing music and the remigration of Jewish musicians. He both initiated and chairs the Study Group Music and Media (MaM) under the auspices of the International Musicological Society (IMS) and coordinates the group's annual conferences.

Wennekes was a member of the program committees of the 7th Congress of Music and the Moving Image (New York: NYU Steinhardt, 2012), the 19th Congress of the International Musicological Society (IMS Rome, 2012), When Jazz Meets Cinema (Centro Studi Luigi Boccherini, Lovere/Bergamo, 2017). For almost a decade, he chaired the Royal Society for Music History of the Netherlands (Koninklijke Vereniging voor Nederlandse Muziekgeschiedenis)
