= Aemilius Ludwig Richter =

German jurist

Aemilius Ludwig Richter (15 February 1808 – 8 May 1864, in Berlin) was a German jurist.

== Biography ==
He was born at Stolpen, Kingdom of Saxony, and educated at Leipzig. His Corpus Juris Canonici (1833–39) led to his being appointed professor of law in Leipzig, and he held subsequently similar positions at the universities of Marburg (1838–46) and Berlin (1846–64). He also served as councilor-in-chief of the consistory and privy councilor of the government.

Richter is considered the founder of a new school of church law — the so-called “Berliner Kanonisten-Schule”.

== Works ==
- Beiträge zur Kenntnis der Quellen des canonischen Rechts (“Contributions to the knowledge about sources for canon law”, 1834)
- Canones et Decreta Concilio Tridentini (1853)
- Lehrbuch des katholischen und evangelischen Kirchenrechts (“Textbook of Catholic and Evangelical Church law”, 1842, 8th edition 1886) Considered a most important contribution to Church law literature.
