= Jules Beau =

French photographer and sports reporter (1864–1932)

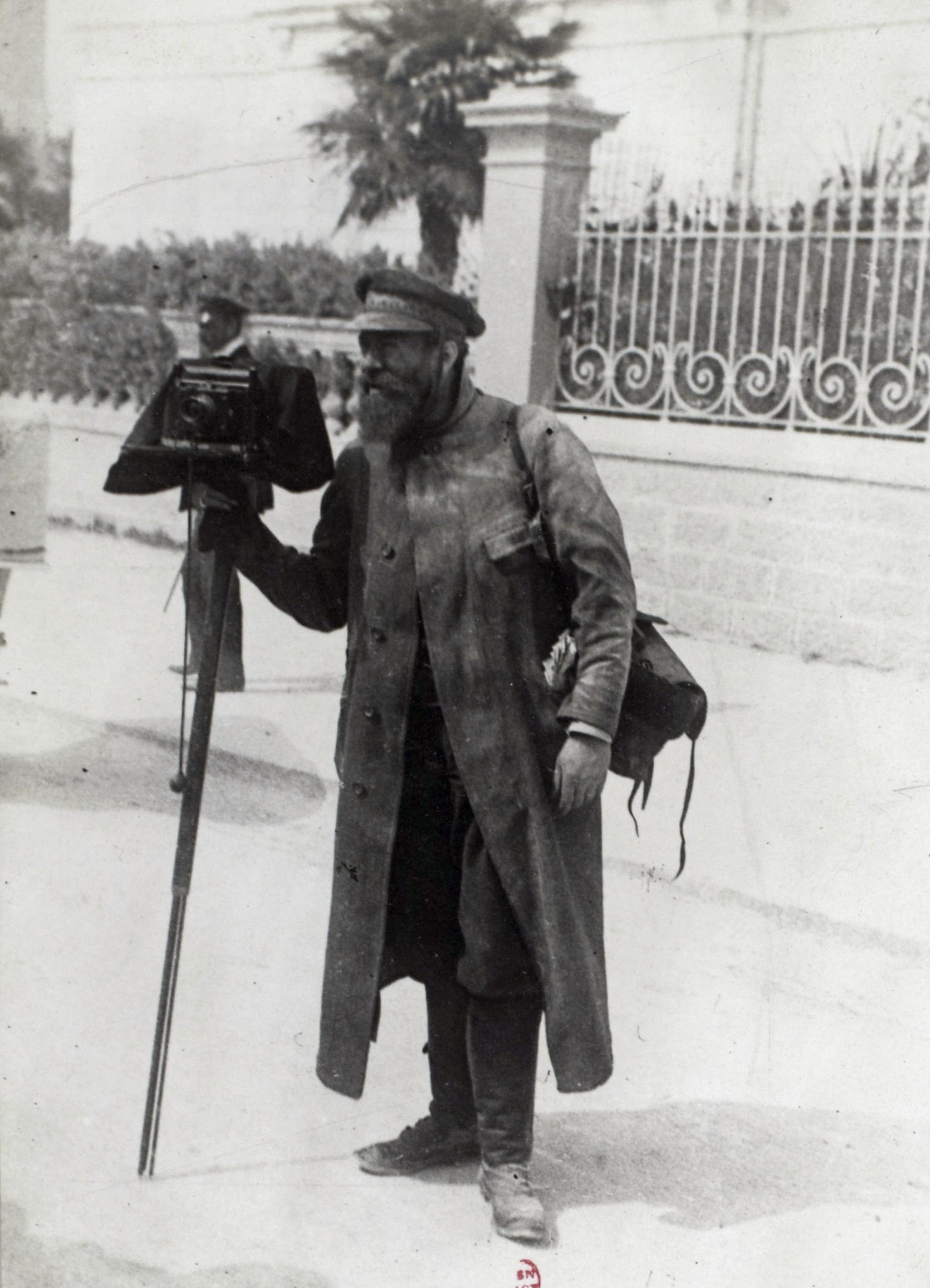
- Jules Beau in 1902
- Born: Joseph Jules Beau; 20 April 1864; 6th arrondissement of Paris, France
- Died: 5 April 1932 (aged 67); Paris, France
- Citizenship: Hungarian
- Occupations: Sports manager; Educational writer; Humanist peace activist
- Known for: Founding member of the International Olympic Committee

Joseph Jules Beau (20 April 1864 – 5 April 1932) was a French photographer and one of the first sports reporters, noted for pioneering the art of shooting sports and distributing the results to the press.

== Early and personal life ==
Jules Beau was born in 6th arrondissement of Paris on 20 April 1864, as the son of a pastry chef. He married Louise Adélaïde Nuret (1865–1923), daughter of a maître d'hôtel.

== Photographic career ==
In 1883, the 19-year-old Beau opened his first studio in Avenue des Ternes, in partnership with the photographer Marc Henri Fontès who already owned another studio on Boulevard de Clichy, and both of them then opened a new studio in Passy in 1890, but three months later, on 24 January 1891, he sold it to Beau, who named it "Photographie de Passy".

Beau was thus the owner of two studios, but rather than settling there and being a simple photographer, he instead decided to focus on outdoors activities because he was attracted to sport, producing numerous portraits of athletes of all categories, with a predilection for motor racing and cycling, but also Rugby union, track and field, boxing, rowing, wrestling, football, and Et cetera. In December 1896, he immortalized the Morel stand during the 4th Cycle Show held in Paris.

Between 1900 and 1904, the newspaper La jeune mère ou l'éducation du premier âge offered to its subscribers a portrait or a photograph of their baby in business card format taken by Beau; the advertisement inserted in the newspaper stated: "Mr. BEAU is a distinguished specialist in children's photography; his studio, located in an elegant district of Paris, is the meeting place for a select and distinguished clientele".

Beau collaborated with the magazine La Bicyclette for three years, from 1895 to 1898, and then with the illustrated sporting activities in La Vie au grand air from 1898 until he ceased all activity in 1913. He also worked for a time as an archivist at the Touring Club de France, an association created by a group of cyclists for the development of tourism in all its forms, and in 1926, he donated his collection of photographs relating to bicycles and automobiles to the Touring Club.

== Death and legacy ==
Beau died in the 16th arrondissement of Paris on 5 April 1932, at the age of 67. From 1894 to 1913, he produced a body of work of astonishing diversity and modernity, and his photographs are now a valuable testimony to the history of French sport in the late 19th and the early 20th centuries. Beau left thirty-six albums of positive prints, which are now all stored in the Bibliothèque nationale de France ("French National Library"), and placed online on Gallica.

In his book Visions du sport, published in 1989, the historian and photographer Jean-Claude Gautrand, who published eight photographs of Jules Beau, stated that he can be considered "the first sports reporter in history".

Henri de Toulouse-Lautrec was inspired by photographs of cyclists by Beau for his advertising poster Simpson chain.

== Bibliography ==
- Gautrand, Jean-Claude (1989). Visions du sport - photographies 1860-1960 [Visions of sport - photographs 1860-1960] (in French). Paris: Éditions Admira. p. 253. ISBN 9782907658027.
