= Emile Yves Picot =

French soldier and politician

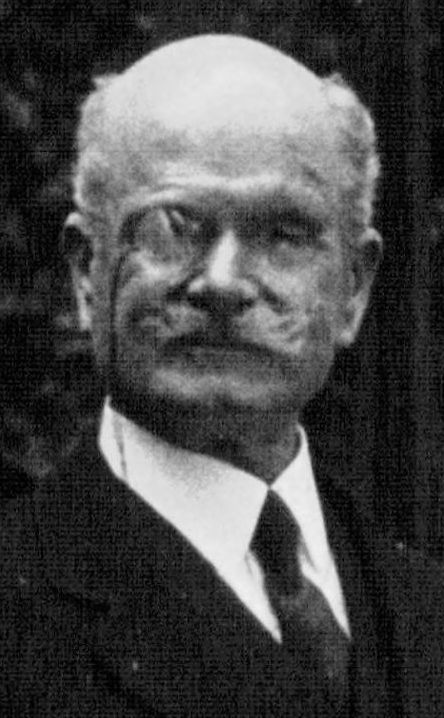
Picot in 1931

Emile Yves Picot was infantry colonel and a French politician born in Brest on 17 March 1862. He died on 19 April 1938 at the age of 76 in La Valette-du-Var, France.

== Military career ==
He was a volunteer in 1881 and then entered Saint-Cyr, promotion of Black Flag (1882–1884). At the outbreak of World War I he was a battalion commander in the 57th Infantry Regiment at Libourne. He participated in the Battle of the Marne in September 1914 and is cited in the order of the Corps.

Mentioned in the 18th Army Corps,

"Picot The commander of the 57th Infantry Regiment, led his battalion to attack the village of Corbény on 13 September 1914, with a decision and a remarkable tactical sense. A managed, through his skillful arrangements and the force of his attack, to take the village almost without loss. "

On 24 September he was placed at the head of the 249th Infantry Regiment as a lieutenant colonel. He was then present at the Chemin des Dames, and Verdun. In 1916 he was made an officer of the Legion of Honor for acts of courage. He was then present in Argonne and in the Somme where he was seriously wounded in the face, in Belloy-en-Santerre, on 15 January 1917. He was evacuated to the Val-de-Grace.

Mentioned on 20 January 1917:

"Head of a brave body, vigor and spirit, is spending lavishly. A seriously wounded by shrapnel in the face, tearing his eye, during one of the many recognitions he had to do, to investigate and stop the details of the organization of the sector, which he had to take command. "

Appointed colonel, he was promoted to the rank of commander of the Legion of Honor.

== Political career ==
He was Undersecretary of State for War from 23 June 1926 until 18 July 1926 in the tenth government of Aristide Briand. He was a member of the Gironde from 1919 to 1932 and in 1933 was elevated to the dignity of Grand Officer of the Legion of Honour. He is credited with the establishment of Gueules Cassées, meaning "broken faces", an organization of veterans with facial injuries from the First World War.
