= Émile Broussais =

French politician (1855–1943)

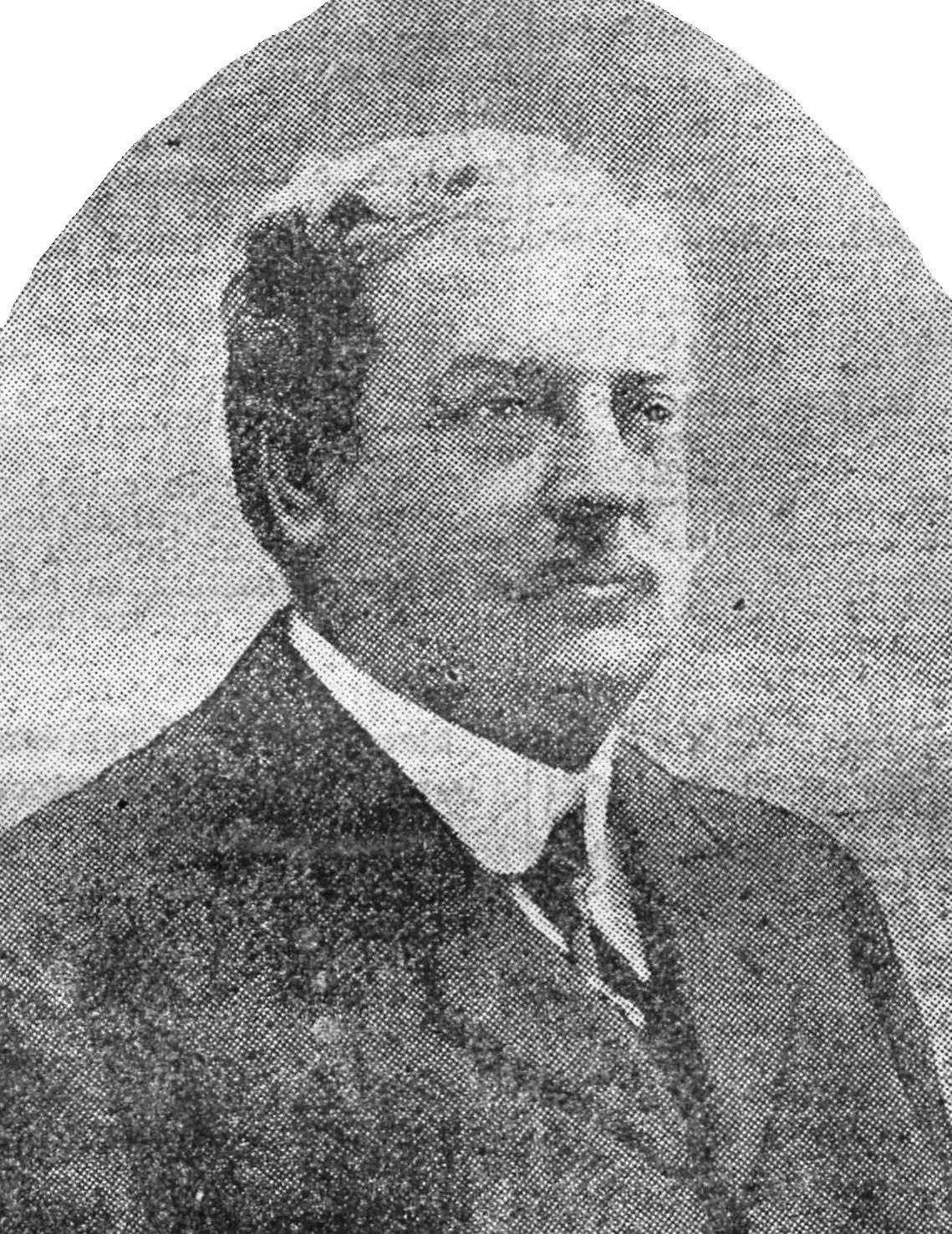
Émile Broussais

Émile Broussais (20 June 1855 - 7 February 1943) was a French politician.

Broussais was born in Paris. He was deputy for French Algeria representing the Radical Party in the Chamber of Deputies from 1910 to 1919.

== Books ==
- De Paris au Soudan (Algiers, 1891)
