= Emile Marchildon =

Canadian ice hockey player

- Born: November 22, 1888; Lafontaine, Ontario, Canada
- Died: February 26, 1967 (aged 78)
- Height: 5 ft 7 in (170 cm)
- Weight: 160 lb (73 kg; 11 st 6 lb)
- Position: Left wing
- Shot: Right
- Played for: Montreal Canadiens; Toronto Ontarios
- Playing career: 1908–1914

Joseph Emile Bruno Aime Marchildon (November 22, 1888 – February 26, 1967), nicknamed Sharkey, was a Canadian professional ice hockey player. He played with the Montreal Canadiens and the Toronto Ontarios of the National Hockey Association during the 1913–14 season.
