= Emil Páleš =

Slovak scientist and philosopher (born 1966)

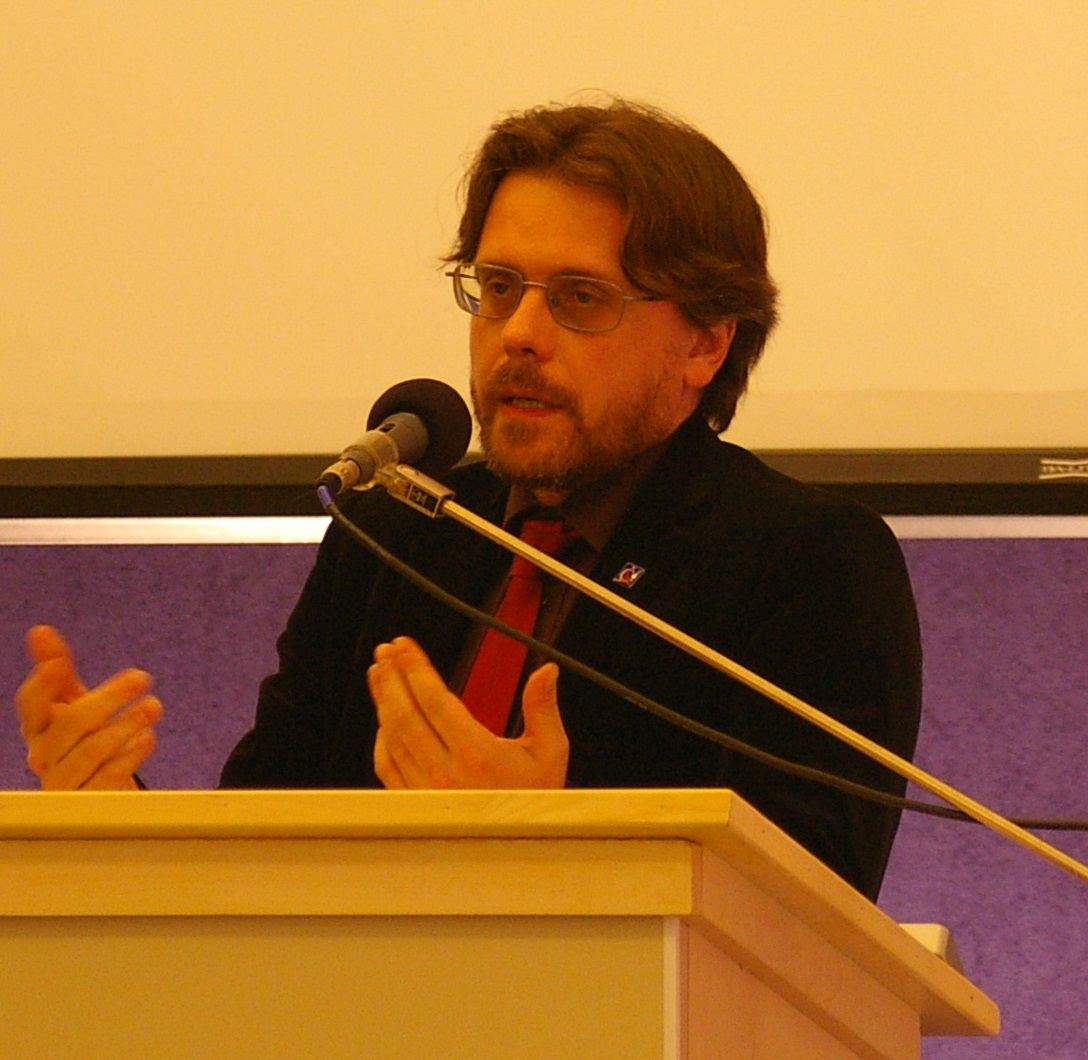
- Páleš in 2010
- Born: 24 January 1966 (age 60); Bratislava, Slovakia
- Education: Comenius University
- Occupations: Scientist, philosopher

Emil Páleš (born 24 January 1966) is a Slovak scientist, philosopher and sociologist. His research focuses on psychological, cultural, and natural patterns of creativity and their temporal laws in individual biographies, world history, and natural evolution.

== Life and work ==
Páleš was born on 24 January 1966 in Bratislava. He studied cybernetics and taught computer linguistics at the Department of Artificial Intelligence at the Faculty of Mathematics and Physics of Comenius University in Bratislava. Between 1989 and 1994, he led a research grant on the "Computational Model of Slovak" at the Institute of Linguistics of Ľudovít Štúr of the Slovak Academy of Sciences. The result was the first computer model of a Slavic language, which modeled the language as a whole and was practically implemented. In 1993, he founded a foundation (later a non-profit organization) called Sophia, dedicated to integrative studies. From 1994 to 1999, he edited the journal "Sophia" with the subtitle "Quarterly for the Introduction of Spiritual Values into Life".

In 2004, he received the Zdeněk Klein Award (together with Professor Miroslav Mikulecký) for the best transdisciplinary work in the field of human ethology, awarded by the Charles University and the Society of Integrative Sciences. In the same year, he founded the School of Angelology. Since 2009, he has regularly participated in the Czech Conference, and in autumn 2011 led a series of lectures at the University of West Bohemia in Plzeň, and in 2013 taught at Palacký University in Olomouc. Since 2013, he has been a regular guest on the Ariadnina nit show on the internet radio station Slobodný vysielač.

== Angelology of history ==
Páleš’s research results were gradually published in the multi-volume monograph "Angelology of History: Synchronicity and Periodicity in History".The first volume was published in 2004 as an expanded second edition in Czech, the second volume in 2012, and work on the third volume is ongoing.
