= Chris Emile =

American dancer

Chris Emile is an American dancer, choreographer, curator, and educator known for their performance career.

== Biography ==
Emile grew up in Inglewood, California and began their dance training in Los Angeles at the Lula Washington Dance Theatre. Emile has also received dance training from the Alvin Ailey American Dance Theater and the Alonzo King Lines Ballet Program In 2014, Chris Emile established the dance collective known as No)one. Art House and continues to be a co-founder. Notable work that Emile has done includes the creation of their solo exhibition performance known as "Amend." This exhibition was hosted in Los Angeles at the MAK center for Art and Architecture and was inspired from Chris Emile's findings from the University of Southern California's possession of digital archives. Emile and other choreographers were selected by USC to explore the digital archives to inspire their work as choreographers.

== Notable work ==
Chris Emile's notable work includes their solo exhibition titled, "Amend." This solo performance is centered on using movement to display the life experiences of Black men.
