= Emile Kellogg Boisot =

American banker (1859–1941)

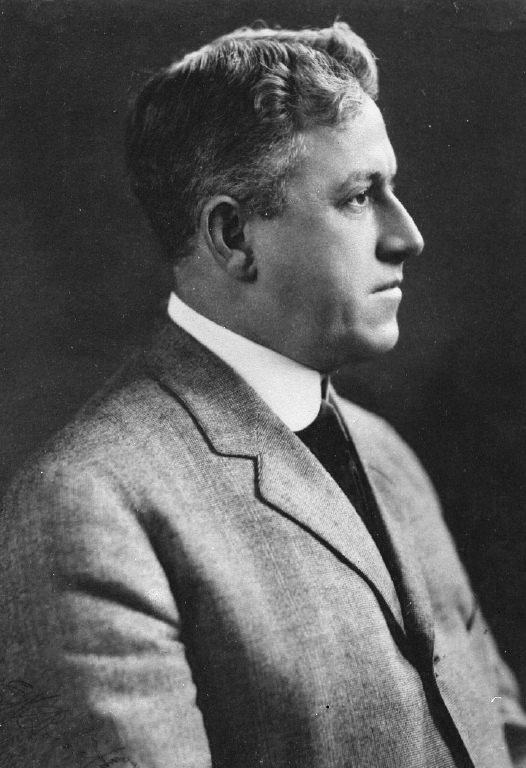
- Portrait of Emile K. Boisot, ca. 1920
- Born: February 26, 1859; Dubuque, Iowa
- Died: 1 February 1941 (aged 81)
- Occupation: Banker

Emile Kellogg Boisot (February 26, 1859 – February 1, 1941) was President of the First Trust and Savings Bank of Chicago, Illinois. He was vice president of the Chicago First National Bank and director of a number of corporations.

== Early life ==
Emile Kellogg Boisot was born in Dubuque, Iowa on February 26, 1859. He was the son of Louis Daniel Boisot and Albertina Bush. He was educated in the public and high schools of Dubuque, Iowa.

== Career ==
In 1878, Boisot moved to Chicago, Illinois where he entered the bond department of First National Bank. The First National Bank of Chicago became the First Chicago Bank, which merged into Bank One Corporation and later the Chase Bank.

On January 1, 1897, Boisot was promoted manager of the Foreign Exchange and Bond Department at First National Bank. In 1903, he was appointed vice president and manager of First Trust and Savings Bank when that bank was organized by First National for the purpose of checking and savings accounts. He became the bank president in 1916. He was director of three other Chicago banks, and was a trustee of Rollins College. He was a member of the Chicago Stock Exchange and the Republican Party. He retired from the presidency of First Trust and Savings Bank in 1919.

== Private life ==
On November 4, 1891, Boisot married Lilly R. Moseman (1860-1939) in Chicago, Illinois. She had been married before to a George Moseman. The Boisots had three children.

While still employed in Chicago, Boisot owned a winter home in Pasadena, California, and retired there full time for 20 years, prior to his death.

On February 1, 1941, Boisot died at his home in Pasadena, California, after a short illness. He was 81 years old.
