= List of Nicaraguan Americans =

This is a list of notable Nicaraguan Americans, including both original immigrants who obtained American citizenship and their American descendants.

To be included in this list, the person must have a Wikipedia article showing they are Nicaraguan American or must have references showing they are Nicaraguan American and are notable.

== List ==
- Annette A. Aguilar, American percussionist, bandleader, and music educator
- Roberto Aguirre-Sacasa, American playwright, screenwriter and comic-book writer
- Patrick Argüello, considered a martyr of the Popular Front for the Liberation of Palestine
- Shakira Barrera - actress (Marvel Cinematic Universe)
- Marvin Benard, Major League Baseball player
- Maurice Benard, actor on American soap operas All My Children and General Hospital
- Carolina Bermudez, radio personality on Elvis Duran and the Morning Show in New York on WHTZ
- Alex Blandino, Major League Baseball player
- Bella Blue, burlesque dancer
- T-Bone, rapper
- Randy Caballero, undefeated Nicaraguan American professional boxer in the Featherweight division
- Róger Calero, ran for U.S. President in the 2004 elections*
- Barbara Carrera, Nicaraguan-born American film and television actress
- Oswaldo Castillo, gardener/construction worker-turned-actor.
- Michael Cordúa, restaurateur, entrepreneur, businessman, award winning self-taught chef
- DJ Craze, only DJ in history to win 3 consecutive World DMC Champion titles
- Miguel D'Escoto, Roman Catholic priest and former foreign minister
- Omar D'León, painter and poet
- Salomón de la Selva, poet, author of Tropical Town and Other Poems
- Edward'O, astronalyst and co-host of 12 Corazones
- Bill Guerin, NHL player (mother from Nicaragua)
- Ricardo Hurtado, American actor (School of Rock)
- Bianca Jagger, human rights advocate and ex-wife of Mick Jagger
- Diana López, Olympic bronze medalist in the sport of taekwondo
- Mark López, Olympic silver medalist in the sport of taekwondo
- Steven López, two time Olympic gold medalist in the sport of taekwondo
- Dennis Martínez, first Nicaraguan-American to be a major league baseball pitcher or player
- Camilo Mejía, former Staff Sergeant of the Florida National Guard and anti-war activist
- Tony Meléndez, singer, composer, writer and musician who was born with no arms
- Christianne Meneses Jacobs, publisher of the only U.S. Spanish-language children's magazine
- Franck de Las Mercedes, painter
- Ana Navarro, Republican strategist and political commentator
- David Obregón, professional boxer
- Horacio Peña, professor, writer, and poet
- Eddy Piñeiro, NFL placekicker
- Claudia Poll, Nicaraguan born swimmer
- Silvia Poll, Nicaraguan born swimmer
- Hope Portocarrero, former First Lady of Nicaragua (1967–1972)
- Anastasio Somoza Portocarrero, son of former Nicaraguan president Anastasio Somoza Debayle and Hope Portocarrero de Somoza
- James Quesada, anthropologist and professor
- Ramirez, rapper and songwriter
- Mari Ramos, weather anchor for CNN
- Michele Richardson, competition swimmer and Olympic silver medalist
- Tammy Rivera, singer and television personality
- J Smooth, bilingual hip hop and reggaeton singer
- Hilda Solis, Los Angeles County Supervisor, former Chair of Los Angeles County, U.S. Secretary of Labor, U.S. congresswoman, member of the California State Senate, and member of the California State Assembly; of Mexican and Nicaraguan descent
- Eve Torres, professional wrestler with WWE
- Torombolo, reggaeton singer
- Gabriela Revilla, writer, producer, director
- Gabriel Traversari, actor, director, writer, singer-songwriter and painter
- Guillermo Wagner Granizo (1923–1995), ceramic tile muralist in Northern California; his mother was from Nicaragua
- Donald Vega, jazz musician and composer
- Mark Vientos, MLB Player for the New York Mets
- Theo Von, comedian
- Benny Urquidez, kickboxer, martial arts choreographer; his father was born in Granada, Nicaragua

== See also ==
- Nicaraguan Americans
- List of Nicaraguans
