= Nicaraguan Americans =

Americans of Nicaraguan birth or descent

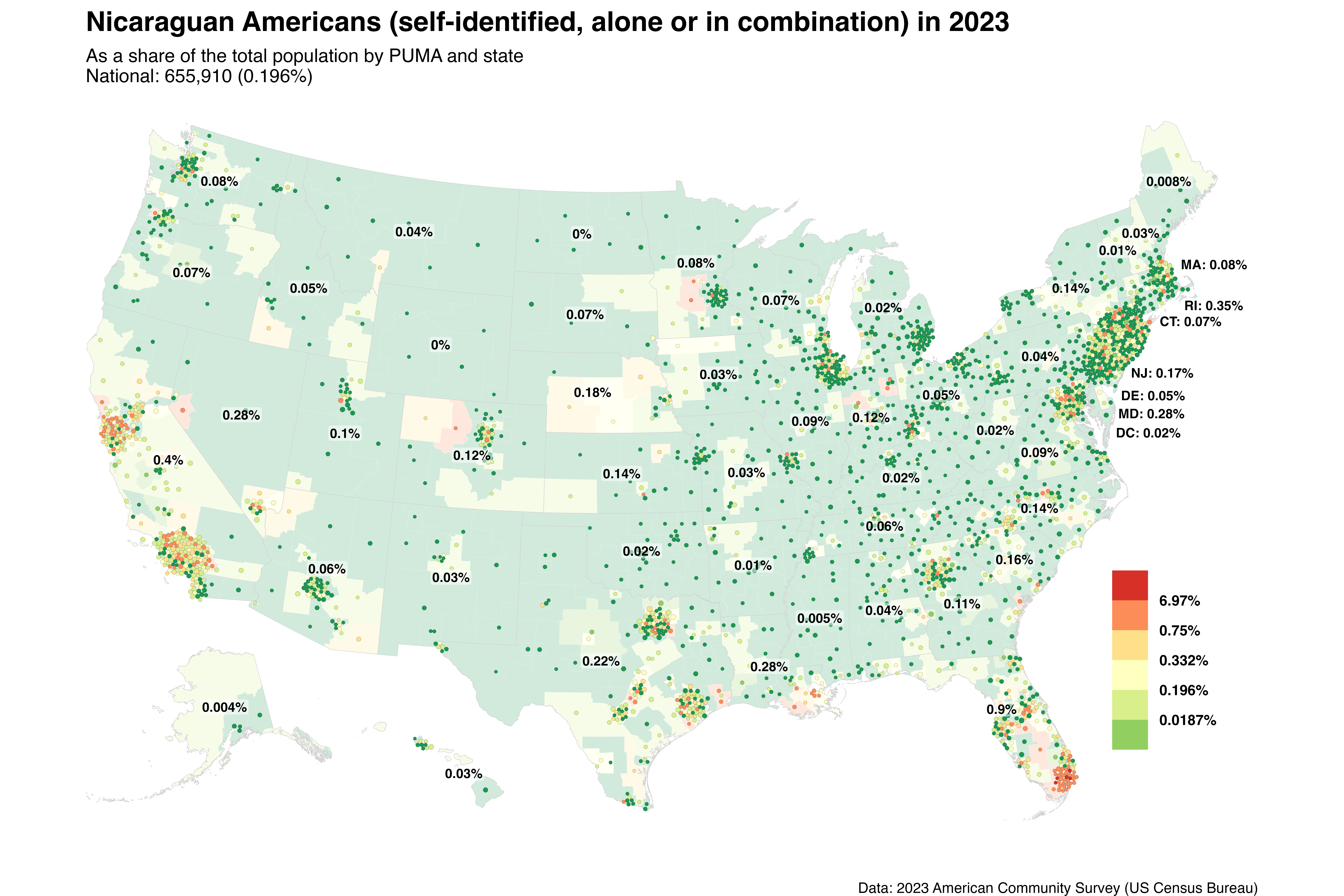

Total population
- 429,501 (2019); 0.13% of the U.S. population (2021)

Regions with significant populations
- Metro Atlanta; Metropolitan Miami; Greater Orlando; Jacksonville; Greater Los Angeles; San Francisco Bay Area; Minneapolis–St. Paul; Denver; Seattle; New York City; Chicago; Wisconsin; Philadelphia; Boston; New Jersey; Connecticut; Washington, D.C.; San Diego; Inland Empire; Houston; Greater San Antonio; Dallas–Fort Worth; New Orleans Metro; Charlotte; Baltimore; Las Vegas

Languages
- Nicaraguan Spanish; American English; Indigenous languages of Nicaragua; Spanglish

Religion
- Predominately Roman Catholic, minority Protestantism

Related ethnic groups
- Hispanic Americans, Honduran Americans, Guatemalan Americans, Salvadoran Americans, Costa Rican Americans, Panamanian Americans, Spanish Americans

A Nicaraguan American (Spanish: nicaragüense-americano, nicaragüense-estadounidense, norteamericano de origen nicaragüense or estadounidense de origen nicaragüense) is an American of Nicaraguan descent. They are also referred to as "nica" or "nicoya".

The Nicaraguan American population at the 2010 Census was 348,202. Nicaraguans are the eleventh largest Hispanic group in the United States and the fourth largest Central American population.

More than two-thirds of the Nicaraguan population in the U.S. resides in California or Florida.

In California, Nicaraguans are more dominant in the Greater Los Angeles Area and San Francisco Bay Area. Large populations also reside in the Inland Empire and the cities of Sacramento, San Diego, and San Jose.

In Florida, 90% of Nicaraguans reside in the Miami metropolitan area. Miami-Dade County is home to 30% of Nicaraguans residing in the United States.

== Immigrational history ==
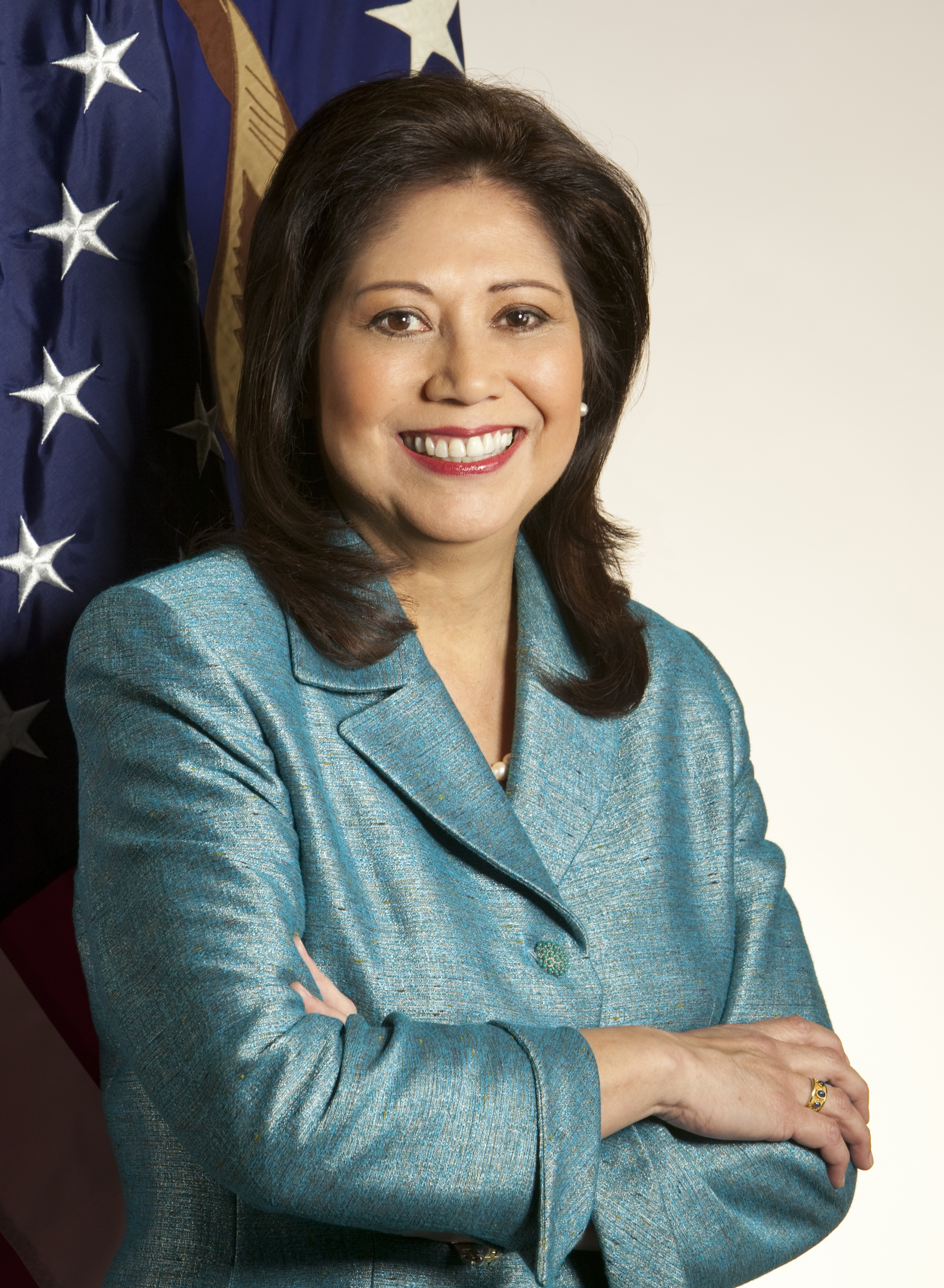
Hilda Solis, first Latina to serve in the U.S. Cabinet.

Nicaraguans have immigrated to the United States in small groups since the early 1900s, but their presence was especially felt over the last three decades of the 20th century. The Nicaraguan community is mainly concentrated in three major urban areas: Metropolitan Miami, Greater Los Angeles, and San Francisco Bay Area. A more affluent group of Nicaraguan Americans reside in the New York metropolitan area.

According to Immigration and Naturalization Service figures, 23,261 Nicaraguans were admitted as permanent residents between 1976 and 1985; 75,264 were admitted between 1986 and 1993; and 94,582 between 1994 and 2002, with a total of 193,107 Nicaraguan immigrants being granted legal status since 1976.

The earliest documents of immigration from Nicaragua to the United States was combined in total with those of other Central American countries. However, according to the U.S. Census Bureau some 7,500 Nicaraguans legally immigrated from 1967 to 1976. An estimated 28,620 Nicaraguans were living in the U.S. in 1970, 90% of which self-reported as white on the 1970 census. Most Nicaraguan immigrants during the late 1960s were women: there were only 60 male Nicaraguan immigrants for every 100 female immigrants during this period. This was due to the number of Central American women who came to the US to work as domestic servants while sending remittances back home. Most Central Americans were denied refugee asylum status during the 1980s. While the U.S. Refugee Act of 1980 wanted to favor U.S. foreign policy to help political asylum seekers it mostly favored only Eastern Bloc or Communist nations or countries in the Middle East. "Asylum decisions with respect to Salvadorans and Guatemalans reflected U.S. foreign policy, which supported their governments" such as U.S. involvement in regime change in Latin America. Many Nicaraguans were rejected despite the Reagan Administration’s stance on helping political refugees. “During the early 1980s, approximately 10 percent of Nicaraguan applicants, compared to 2 to 3 percent of those from El Salvador and Guatemala, received asylum.”

Over 62 percent of the total documented immigration from 1979 to 1988 occurred after 1984. In 1998 more than two million Nicaraguans were left homeless due to hurricane Mitch, as a result many Nicaraguans received permanent residence or temporary protected status (TPS) in the late 1990s.

According to the 1990 U.S. census 168,659 of the total 202,658 documented Nicaraguans in the U.S. were born in Nicaragua. In 1992 approximately 10–12% of the Nicaraguan population had emigrated. These emigrants tended to be disproportionately of working age, better educated, and more often white-collar workers than non-migrants. In addition, emigrants were more likely to come from larger premigration households and higher income households.

== Motives for Immigration ==
The Sandinista revolution that started in the mid-1970s and the Contra war that followed brought the first large waves of Nicaraguan refugees into the U.S. As a result of the de-privatization reforms under the Sandinista National Liberation Front (FSLN)'s rule (from 1979 to 1990), the first wave of approximately 120,000 Nicaraguans left Nicaragua and entered the United States.

They consisted mainly of large landholders, industrialists, and managers of North American enterprises. Many Nicaraguan upper-class exiles had economic roots in the United States and in Miami before the upheaval. This phase of upper-class arrivals included exiled dictator Anastasio Somoza Debayle and his family, who owned homes in Miami and were among the richest people in Florida (ibid).

Another major wave of Nicaraguans to the United States, consisting primarily of blue collar workers, peaked in the dramatic exodus of early 1989. Again, their motivation for migration was to escape from both political and economic torment in their homeland. By the late 1980s, the war, Hurricane Joan in 1988, and a severe drought in 1989 left the country in economic ruins. Many of these Nicaraguan immigrants settled in poor and deteriorated sections of Miami, where struggling Cubans who came during the Mariel boatlift exodus of 1980 had previously lived.

Many Nicaraguans who immigrated did so to escape poverty. In Santa Clara County, California, the Nicaraguan public benefits recipients reported that in their families, 43% have one self-employed person or business owner, and 14% of the families have two such persons.

== Cultural ==
Nicaraguan Americans are Spanish-speaking and predominately Catholic. They celebrate the patron saints of the Roman Catholic Church with festivals and processions, which also provide a context for artistic and cultural expressions of the local identity. The most important patronal festivals for communities in Florida include Santa Ana, San Sebastian, La Purisima, San Jeronimo and La Griteria. Nicaragua is one of the most traditionalist countries in the Americas and so the majority of Nicaraguans define themselves as socially conservatives regardless of party affiliations or place of residence within the United States.

== Demographics ==
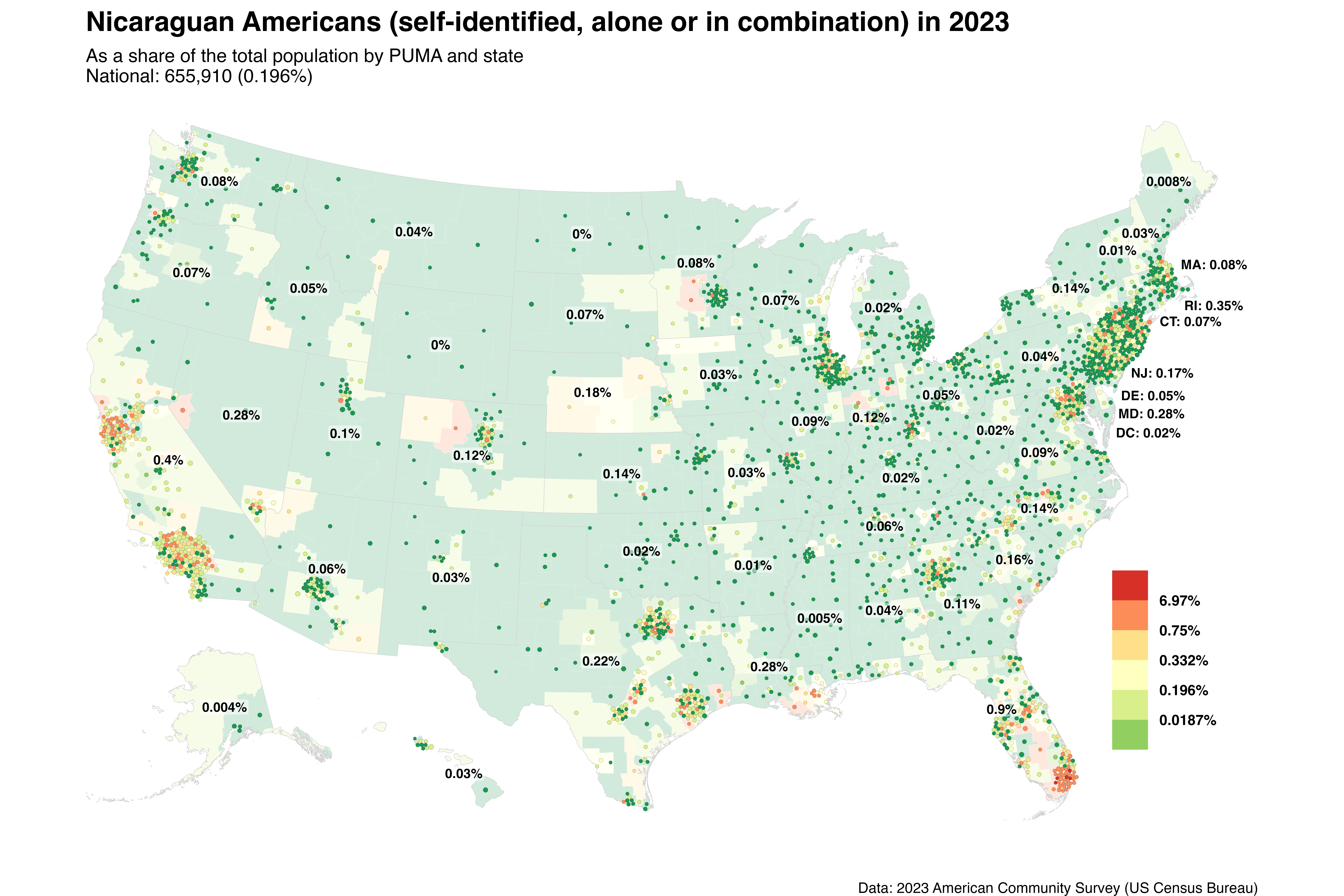
Map of Nicaraguan Americans

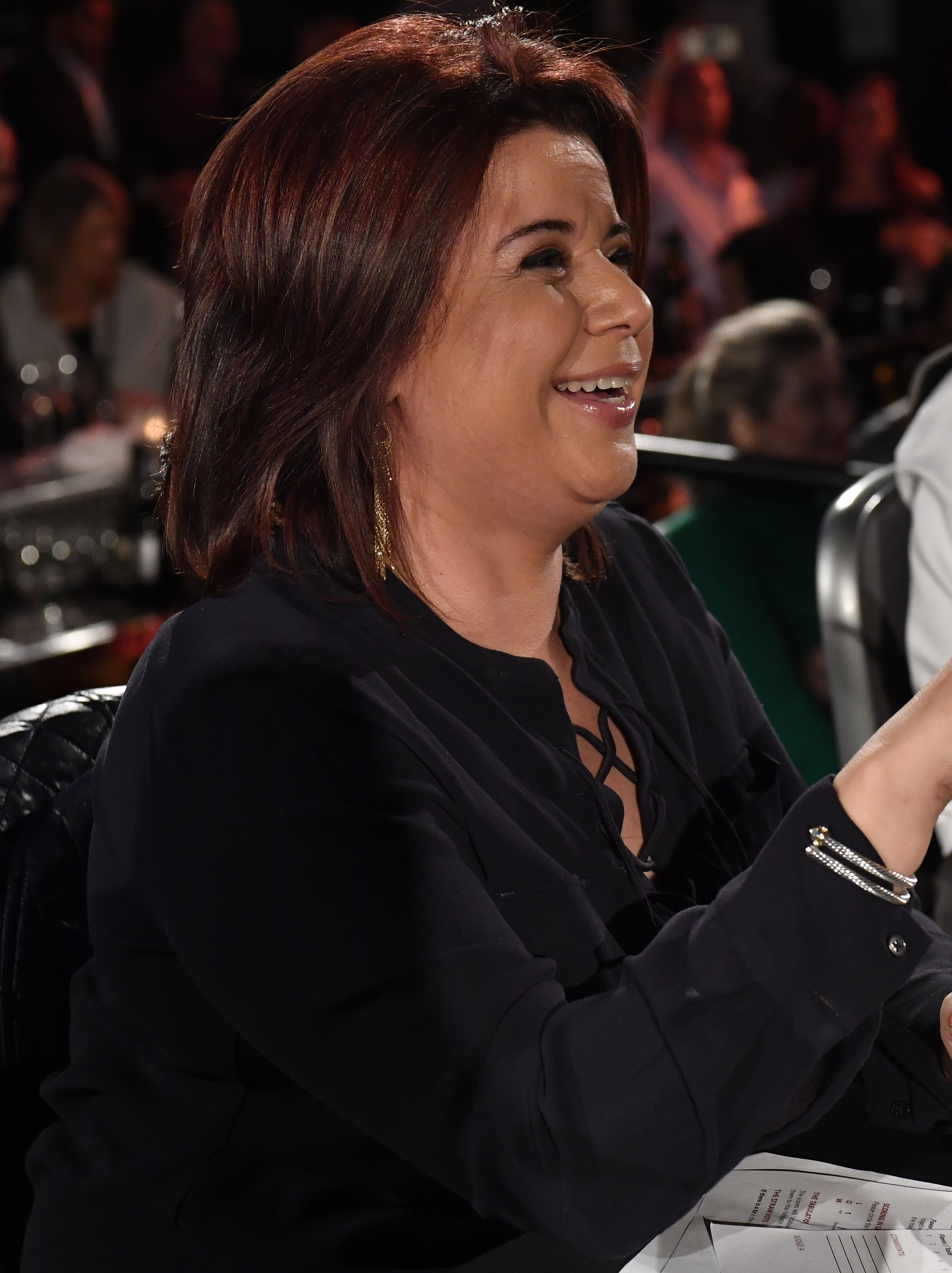
Ana Navarro television programs and news outlets, including CNN, CNN en Español

Outside of California and Florida, Nicaraguans can also be found in New York City, New Orleans Metro, and the Washington metropolitan area. Cities with noticeable Nicaraguan populations also include Charlotte, Houston, Jersey City, and Camden, Milwaukee, Wisconsin and Madison. The Amigos de las Americas program set in motion by John F. Kennedy in the early 1960s promoted the sisterhood between states of the U.S. and third world countries. Wisconsin is the original sister State to Nicaragua. Employment and Student exchange programs in the past were the main reason for the first Nicaraguan to arrive and settle in that Midwest State.

=== States ===
The 10 states with the largest population of Nicaraguans (Source: 2010 Census):

1. Florida - 135,143
2. California - 100,790
3. Texas - 19,817
4. New York - 13,006
5. New Jersey - 8,222
6. Maryland- 8,196
7. Virginia - 7,388
8. Louisiana - 6,390
9. North Carolina - 4,964
10. Georgia - 4,787

=== Areas ===
The largest population of Nicaraguans are situated in the following areas (Source: Census 2010):

1. Miami-Fort Lauderdale-West Palm Beach, FL MSA - 118,768
2. Los Angeles-Long Beach-Santa Ana, CA MSA - 40,607
3. San Francisco-Oakland-Fremont, CA MSA - 30,807
4. New York-Northern New Jersey-Long Island, NY-NJ-PA MSA - 17,987
5. Washington-Arlington-Alexandria, DC-VA-MD-WV MSA - 14,187
6. Riverside-San Bernardino-Ontario, CA MSA - 9,793
7. Houston-Sugar Land-Baytown, TX MSA - 9,496
8. New Orleans-Metairie-Kenner, LA MSA - 5,310
9. San Jose-Sunnyvale-Santa Clara, CA MSA - 4,540
10. Orlando-Kissimmee-Sanford, FL MSA - 4,083
11. Dallas-Fort Worth-Arlington, TX MSA - 3,964
12. Atlanta-Sandy Springs-Marietta, GA MSA - 3,719
13. Las Vegas-Paradise, NV MSA - 3,587
14. Sacramento-Arden-Arcade-Roseville, CA MSA - 3,269
15. Philadelphia-Camden-Wilmington, PA-NJ-DE-MD MSA - 3,163
16. Chicago-Joliet-Naperville, IL-IN-WI MSA - 2,928
17. Tampa-St. Petersburg-Clearwater, FL MSA - 2,589
18. Phoenix-Mesa-Glendale, AZ MSA - 2,169
19. San Diego-Carlsbad-San Marcos, CA MSA - 2,025
20. Charlotte-Gastonia-Rock Hill, NC-SC MSA - 1,912
21. Vallejo-Fairfield, CA MSA - 1,750
22. Austin-Round Rock-San Marcos, TX MSA - 1,714
23. Seattle-Tacoma-Bellevue, WA MSA - 1,635
24. San Antonio-New Braunfels, TX MSA - 1,547
25. Boston-Cambridge-Quincy, MA-NH MSA - 1,438

=== U.S. communities with largest population of people of Nicaraguan ancestry ===
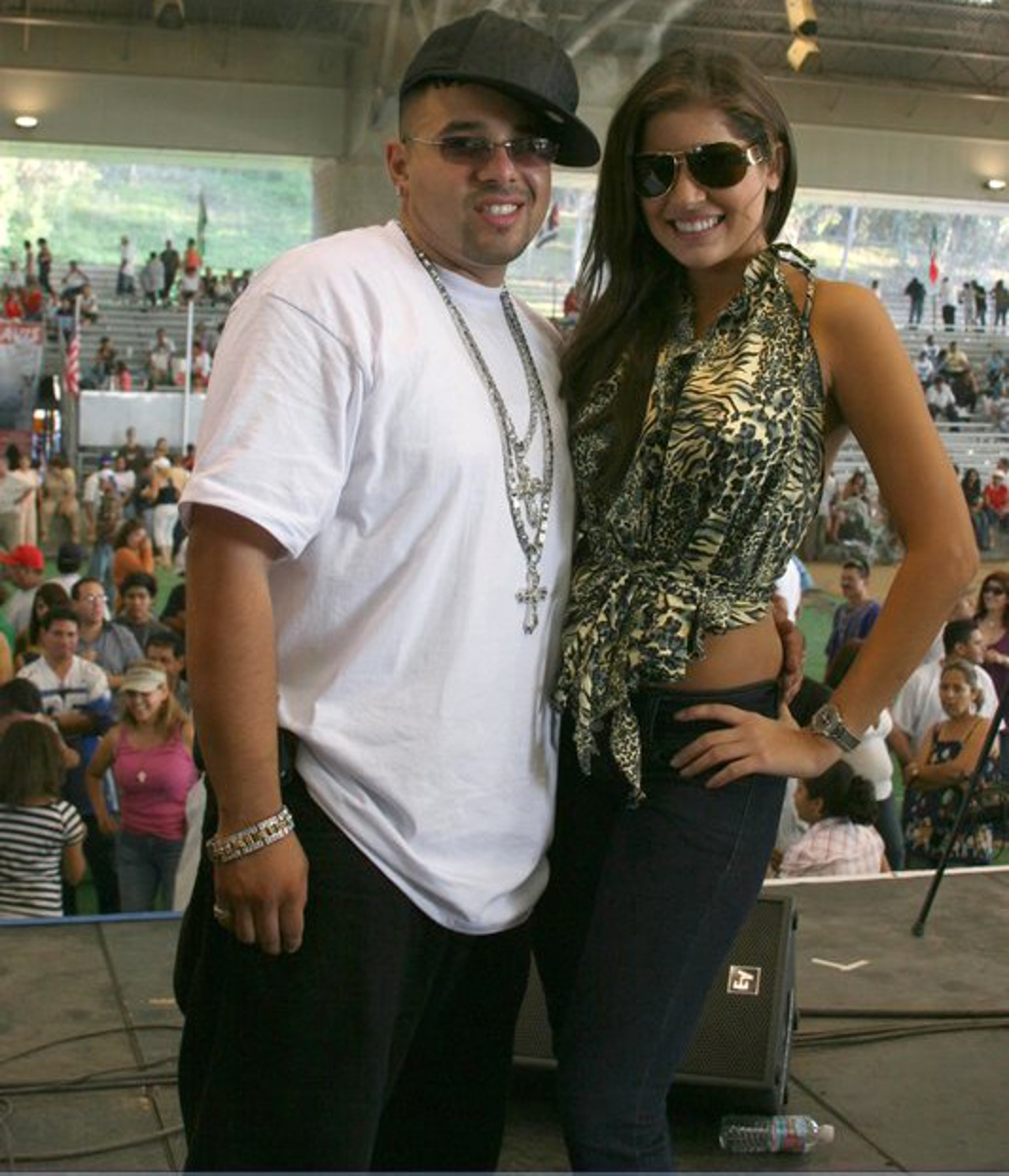
J Smooth and Miss Nicaragua 2007, Xiomara Blandino celebrating La Feria Agostina, or the Nicaraguan Festival, in Los Angeles with up to 8,000 Nicaraguan Americans.

The top 25 U.S. communities with the highest populations of Nicaraguans (Source: Census 2010)

1. Miami - 28,618
2. Los Angeles - 15,572
3. Hialeah, Florida - 10,410
4. San Francisco - 7,604
5. Fontainebleau, Florida - 6,738
6. Houston, Texas - 4,226
7. Kendale Lakes, Florida - 3,560
8. Tamiami, Florida - 3,476
9. Sweetwater, Florida - 3,102
10. San Jose, California - 2,917
11. Kendall, Florida - 2,629
12. The Hammocks, Florida - 2,391
13. Kendall West, Florida - 2,265
14. Miami Gardens, Florida - 2,134
15. West Little River, Florida - 2,112
16. Richmond West, Florida - 2,039
17. Miami Lakes, Florida - 1,772
18. Hayward, California - 1,745
19. Miramar, Florida - 1,691
20. South San Francisco, California - 1,639
21. South Miami Heights, Florida - 1,585
22. Metairie, Louisiana - 1,462
23. Pembroke Pines, Florida - 1,423
24. Homestead, Florida - 1,354
25. Hialeah Gardens and Hollywood, Florida - 1,321

=== U.S. communities with high percentages of people of Nicaraguan ancestry ===
The top 25 U.S. communities with the highest percentages of Nicaraguans as a percent of total population (Source: Census 2010)

1. Sweetwater, Florida - 22.98%
2. Fontainebleau, Florida - 11.27%
3. Miami, Florida - 7.16%
4. Richmond West, Florida - 6.38%
5. Kendale Lakes, Florida - 6.34%
6. Tamiami, Florida - 6.29%
7. Kendall West, Florida - 6.26%
8. West Little River, Florida - 6.09%
9. Hialeah Gardens, Florida - 6.08%
10. Brownsville, Florida - 5.66%
11. Stock Island, Florida - 5.66%
12. Medley, Florida - 4.89%
13. Princeton, Florida - 4.89%
14. Gladeview, Florida - 4.83%
15. The Hammocks, Florida - 4.69%
16. Hialeah, Florida - 4.63%
17. South Miami Heights, Florida - 4.44%
18. University Park, Florida - 4.32%
19. Rollingwood, California - 4.14%
20. Palmetto Estates, Florida - 4.13%
21. Colma, California - 4.02%
22. Miami Lakes, Florida and Country Walk, Florida - 3.90%
23. The Crossings, Florida - 3.89%
24. Country Club, Florida - 3.76%
25. Westwood Lakes, Florida - 3.72%

== Notable people ==
- Alex Blandino, MLB player
- Marvin Benard, MLB player
- Mark Vientos, MLB player
- Maurice Benard, actor on American soap operas
- Bella Blue, burlesque dancer
- Nastassja Bolívar, beauty pageant winner
- Theo Von, comedian
- Randy Caballero, professional boxer
- Barbara Carrera, actress in film and TV
- Oswaldo Castillo, actor
- Michael Cordúa restaurateur
- DJ Craze, DJ
- Salomón de la Selva, poet
- Franck de Las Mercedes, painter
- Miguel D'Escoto, Roman Catholic priest and former foreign minister
- Omar D'León, painter and poet
- Edward'O, astrologer and TV host
- Luis Enrique, singer
- Bill Guerin, NHL hockey player
- Bianca Jagger, human rights advocate
- Diana López, taekwondo
- Mark López, taekwondo
- Steven López, taekwondo
- Dennis Martínez, MLB player (1976–1998)
- Camilo Mejía, former Staff Sergeant of the Florida National Guard turned anti-war activist
- Tony Meléndez, singer, composer, writer and musician
- Christianne Meneses Jacobs, children's magazine publisher
- Ana Navarro, Republican strategist and political commentator
- David Obregón, professional boxer
- Horacio Peña, professor, writer, and poet
- Eddy Piñeiro, NFL placekicker
- Claudia Poll, Nicaraguan-born swimmer
- Silvia Poll, Nicaraguan-born swimmer
- Hope Portocarrero, former First Lady of Nicaragua (1967–1978)
- James Quesada, anthropologist and professor
- Mari Ramos, weather anchor for CNN
- Tammy Rivera, singer and television personality
- J Smooth, bilingual hip hop and reggaeton singer
- Hilda Solis, U.S. congresswoman and the 25th United States Secretary of Labor
- Anastasio Somoza Portocarrero, military person
- T-Bone, rapper
- Torombolo, reggaeton singer
- Eve Torres, WWE Diva, professional wrestler
- Gabriel Traversari, TV actor, director
- Donald Vega, jazz musician and composer
- Eddy Pineiro, NFL player
- Jason Gonzalez UFC, mixed martial arts
- Shakira Barrera, actress
- Ramirez, rapper and songwriter

== See also ==
- Nicaragua–United States relations
