= Bellechasse =

Bellechasse ("beautiful hunt" if translated literally from French) may refer to:

== Places ==
- Bellechasse Prison, Switzerland
- Bellechasse (Lower Canada), an electoral district 1829–1838
- Bellechasse (Province of Canada), an electoral district 1841–1867
- Bellechasse (federal electoral district), 1867–1996
- Bellechasse (provincial electoral district), 1867–present
- Bellechasse Regional County Municipality, Quebec
- Bellechasse County, Quebec (defunct by 2008)
- Belle Chasse, Louisiana

== People ==
- Joseph Deville Degoutin Bellechasse (1761–1837), Spanish colonial administrator in North America
- Yannick Bellechasse (born 1992), Saint-Martinois footballer
