= Jeremy Vujnovich =

American football player (born 1990)

No. 60, 67, 68
- Position: Offensive guard

Personal information
- Born: October 12, 1990 (age 36); Belle Chasse, Louisiana, U.S.
- Listed height: 6 ft 5 in (1.96 m)
- Listed weight: 300 lb (136 kg)

Career information
- High school: Belle Chasse
- College: Louisiana College
- NFL draft: 2013: undrafted

Career history
- Green Bay Packers (2014–2015)*; Indianapolis Colts (2016–2017); Arizona Cardinals (2018–2019); Washington Football Team (2020)*
- * Offseason or practice squad member only

Career NFL statistics
- Games played: 23
- Games started: 18
- Stats at Pro Football Reference

Jeremy Michael Vujnovich (born October 12, 1990) is an American former professional football player who was an offensive guard in the National Football League (NFL). He played college football at Louisiana College. He was signed by the Green Bay Packers as an undrafted free agent in 2014 and was also a member of the Indianapolis Colts, Arizona Cardinals, and Washington Redskins.

== Professional career ==
Pre-draft measurables
Height	Weight	40-yard dash	10-yard split	20-yard split	20-yard shuttle	Three-cone drill	Vertical jump	Broad jump	Bench press
6 ft 5 in (1.96 m)	290 lb (132 kg)	4.87 s	1.72 s	2.81 s	4.64 s	7.57 s	27.5 in (0.70 m)	8 ft 11 in (2.72 m)	35 reps
All values are from Pro Day

=== Green Bay Packers ===
After going undrafted in the 2013 NFL draft, Vujnovich signed with the Green Bay Packers on January 7, 2014. On August 30, 2014, he was released by the Packers during final team cuts. Vujnovich was signed to the Packers' practice squad the following day. On January 20, 2015, he was re-signed by the Packers after finishing the season on the practice squad.

On September 5, 2015, Vujnovich was released by the Packers during final team cuts for the second straight season. He was signed to the Packers' practice squad on September 7, 2015. On January 18, 2016, Vujnovich was re-signed by the Packers after finishing the season on the practice squad. He was released by the Packers on May 9, 2016.

=== Indianapolis Colts ===
Vujnovich was signed by the Indianapolis Colts on May 12, 2016. On September 3, 2016, he was waived by the Colts during final team cuts. Vujnovich was signed to the Colts' practice squad the next day. On October 1, 2016, he was promoted from the practice squad to the active roster. Vujnovich was waived by the Colts on October 13, 2016, and was signed to the practice squad the following day. He was promoted to the active roster on December 15, 2016.

Head coach Chuck Pagano named Vujnovich the starting left guard to begin the regular season and he started all 16 games in 2017. On September 1, 2018, Vujnovich was waived by the Colts.

=== Arizona Cardinals ===
On September 2, 2018, Vujnovich was claimed off waivers by the Arizona Cardinals. He played in five games, starting two, before being placed on injured reserve on September 29, 2018, after dealing with a hamstring injury throughout the season. On September 7, 2019, Vujnovich was released by the Cardinals, but was re-signed two days later. He was released again on September 21, 2019.

=== Washington Redskins ===
Vujnovich signed with the Washington Redskins on March 26, 2020, but was released on July 26, 2020.
