= National School of Arts =

National School of Arts may refer to:

- Conservatoire national des arts et métiers, Paris
- Danish National School of Performing Arts, Copenhagen
- Escuela Nacional de Artes Plásticas "Rafael Rodríguez Padilla", Guatemala City
- Escuela Nacional de Bellas Artes, several schools in Spanish-speaking countries
- Korea National University of Arts, Seoul
- National Art Schools (Cuba)
- National College of Arts, Lahore, Pakistan
- National Arts School (Papua New Guinea)
- National School of Arts (UNAM), in Mexico
- National Taiwan University of Arts in Taiwan
