= Penélope Menchaca =

Mexican television host, singer and actress

Penélope Menchaca (born September 6, 1968) is a Mexican television host, singer, and actress.

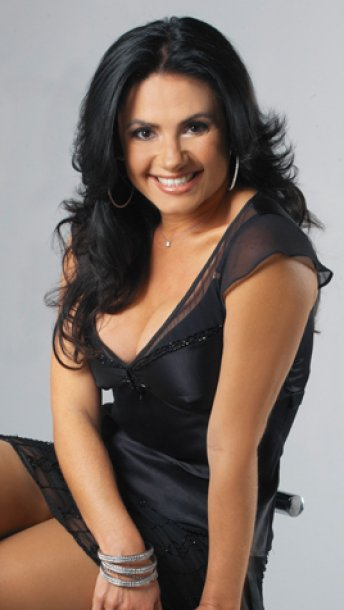

== Biography ==
Menchaca was born in Mexico City, Mexico. She is the daughter of Dolores Menchaca, director of The Mexican National Ballet Folklorico. Menchaca attended University La Salle in Mexico City where she majored in law.

At the age of 15, she joined the National Ballet of Mexico and traveled the world as a feature ballerina. She joined the singing group Las Nenas at the age of 19, and was their lead vocalist for nearly 15 years.

When she was 19 years old, Menchaca married for 11 years until divorcing, they have two daughters together.

== Career ==
In 1999, Las Nenas were traveling the United States where she got the attention of KRCA Channel 62 (Los Angeles TV) who was launching an afternoon show called "Los Angeles al día" and wanted Menchaca as the host. After a lot of convincing by Channel 62 she gave up the singing group and moved with her two daughters to live in Los Angeles and host the show Los Angeles en Vivo. During the five years that she was host to the unscripted and live show she interviewed personalities such as Chayanne, David Copperfield, John Leguizamo, Lupillo and Jenni Rivera. Singer Adán Sánchez's first TV appearance was on her show and a regular guest.

In 2004, Promofilm, a content supplier to Telemundo recruited Menchaca to host the show 12 Corazones (12 Hearts) a dating game that combines astrology with games. The show debuted December 2004 on Telemundo local station Channel 22.

In January 2006, the show was picked up by Televisa Mexico with 3 shows a day being aired. The show also began to be transmitted to Colombia, Panama, Peru, Honduras, Guatemala, Puerto Rico and Venezuela.

Menchaca has also hosted other weekend specials, including Noche de Poker, 100 Mexicanos Dijeron, Miss Universe 2006, and Billboard Latin Music Awards, El Grito, to name a few.

In August 2009, 12 Corazones: Rumbo al Altar began as a one-hour, weekend spin-off of Telemundo's weekday daytime game show "12 Corazones". Also hosted by Penelope Menchaca, the show features 12 engaged partners (6 couples) competing for weekly prizes to jump-start their lives together and a chance to win the grand prize of a dream wedding.

In August 2011 Televisa selected Menchaca to be the host of their version of Minute To Win It, to air on Sundays April 2012. 12 Corazones started its 8th season in March 2012.

In 2018, Menchaca joined the roster of TV Azteca's morning show, Venga la Alegría, hosting a debate segment called Las cosas como son.

In 2021 Penelope left TV Azteca and moved to Milan, Italy to be close to her family. She started taping El Poder del Amor 2 in Istanbul, Turkey for Latin America.

In December 2022 Penelope returned from Europe and moved to Miami to host Telemundo's morning show Hoy Dia.

== Book ==
In 2010, Menchaca authored a Spanish language book entitled El Arte Del Cuchiplancheo (English: "The Art of the Horizontal Dance"). In her book, Menchaca provides tips for the "... enjoyment of erotic nature and sensuality: making love without inhibitions and diving with unabashed joy into the world of erotic games and sizzling sex fantasies."

== Personal life ==
Menchaca who is divorced, was married for 11 years, and has two daughters. Her older daughter Yania worked on 12 Corazones in the casting department for a year before entering college.

Menchaca stays in shape by working out 7 days a week, partaking in boot camp, boxing, salsa dancing, and lifting weights.

Menchaca has a collection of macabre and diabolical looking dolls, including a replica of "Chucky" from the Child's Play movies. Her favorite football team is Club América from her hometown of Mexico City.

Menchaca has admitted to having had a breast lift. Despite her sexy and flirtatious on screen persona on 12 Corazones, Menchaca claims to be rather conservative when it comes to relationships, and has only been with five men her entire life.
