= 12 Corazones: Rumbo al Altar =

12 Corazones: Rumbo al Altar (12 Hearts: Heading to the Altar) is a one-hour, weekend spin-off of Telemundo’s weekday daytime game show 12 Corazones. Hosted by Penélope Menchaca, the show features 12 engaged partners (6 couples) competing for weekly prizes to jump-start their lives together and a chance to win the grand prize of a dream wedding.
