= Edith Grøn =

Nicaraguan sculptor (1917–1990)

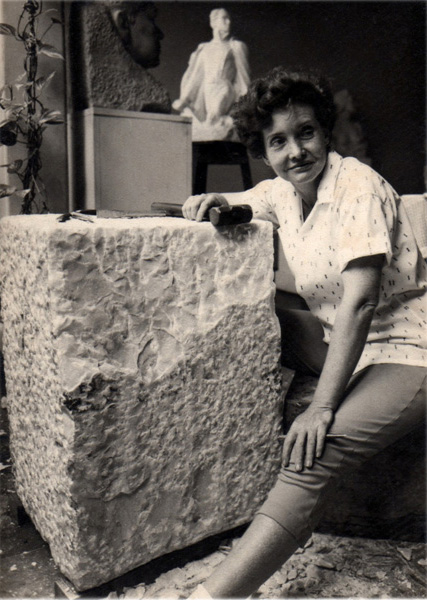
- working on the bust of Rubén Darío
- Born: 19 February 1917; Copenhagen, Denmark
- Died: 15 March 1990 (aged 73); Managua, Nicaragua
- Occupation: sculptor

Edith Grøn (19 February 1917 – 15 March 1990) was a Danish-born Nicaraguan sculptor. She is considered to be the most significant 20th-century Nicaraguan sculptor. Her works are featured in public spaces throughout Nicaragua and abroad.

== Early life ==
Edith Dorthe Grøn was born on 19 February 1917 in Copenhagen, Denmark to Sofie (née Rasmussen) and Vilhelm Andersen Grøn. When she was 6 years old, in 1923, her family, which included her brother Niels, migrated to Nicaragua because her mother had been advised a warmer climate would help her arthritis. Her mother's illness coupled with the economic depression which existed in Denmark after World War I, prompted Vilhelm to bring the family to Central America. The family came with an immigration company which had contracted with the Nicaraguan government to resettle up to 2,000 Danish families in the country. One hundred settlers came in her migration group, which initially settled on a farm in the mountainous area around Matagalpa. After moving about the country several times, the family finally settled in Managua, where Vilhelm owned and operated a restaurant known as La Casa Dinamarca ("The Denmark House"). From an early age, she enjoyed producing artworks, first with paint and then clay.

Grøn completed both her primary and secondary education at the Colegio Bautista in Managua. In 1931, Grøn was involved in a serious car accident, when her father lost control of the car, and she flew through the windshield, breaking all the bones in her face. After numerous surgeries, performed by missionary doctors visiting from North America, she recovered, but remained scarred. In 1942, she entered the National School of Fine Arts (Spanish: Escuela Nacional de Bellas Artes), studying under Genaro Amador Lira, along with students like Roberto de la Selva and Fernando Saravia. In 1943, Grøn won the Rubén Darío Art Prize, for her work Amo Muerto, which was then exhibited at the National Palace of Culture. The sculpture depicted a dog mourning at the grave of its young owner. Wanting to further her studies, Grøn moved to Mexico City in 1944 to study at the Academy of San Carlos with Fidias Elizondo. She studied Classic Arts and Architecture and in 1944, exhibited El Puntigado, which received notice in the Mexican press and secured her a scholarship at Columbia University in New York City. The sculpture was the figure of a crying child who had been whipped as a form of punishment. In 1946, she entered Columbia, studying ceramics and sculpture, completing her studies in 1948 and returning to Nicaragua.

== Career ==
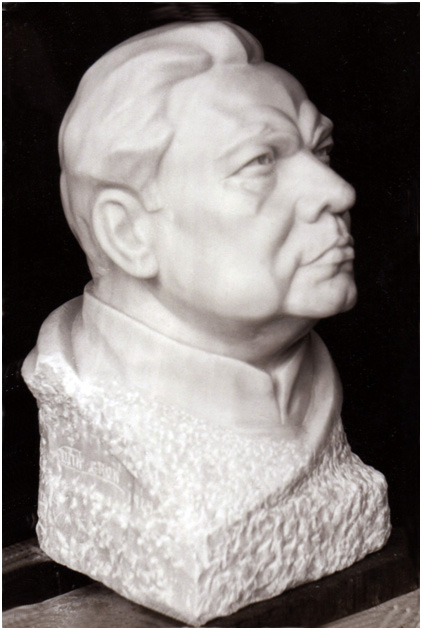
The bust of Darío which adorns the Rubén Darío National Theatre

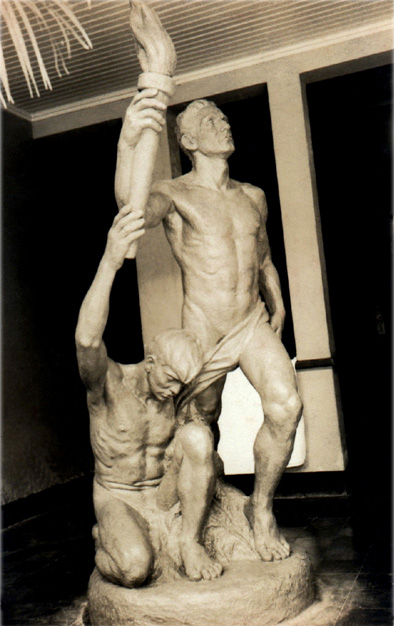
El Relevo, (The Relay) is in front of the Post Office, Managua

From 1940 to 1952, Grøn was in a relationship with Silvio Turcios, known as Bill. He was a boxer and fireman, and because of his physique, became her model for several sculptures, including the muscles for the athletes of El Relevo. According to her biographer, José Vivó, The Relay is known internationally as a symbol for the transfer of wisdom and knowledge. Grøn held her first solo exhibit at the National Palace of Culture in 1953, exhibiting large Costumbrismo sculptures of figures and several nudes. For the centennial celebration of the Battle of San Jacinto, she sculpted Andrés Castro Estrada, which was installed at the Hacienda San Jacinto in 1956. In 1958, she produced a sculpture of the head of journalist Gabry Rivas and that same year, she was decorated with the Order of Rubén Darío by the government of Nicaragua. The following year, she completed a monument dedicated to mothers, commissioned by historian Julián N. Guerrero. The statue, Monumento a la Madre was installed in Boaco.

Grøn sculpted in clay, stone and wood, and molded in concrete and various metals. Her initial works were realistic and she strove for perfection, but she was influenced by the Romanian modernist Constantin Brâncuși, which led her to shift to more stylized forms. In 1960, she completed a statue of General José Dolores Estrada for the Nicaraguan Association of Writers and Artists. She was known for her sculptures of Rubén Darío, and also depicted personalities such as Josefa Toledo de Aguerri, Pablo Antonio Cuadra, among others. A 1958 sculpture of Darío was installed in a Miami, Florida park in 1961. That same year, Grøn carved a stone head of Darío clothed in a Carthusian habit, titling it La Cartuja, in reference to the poet's 1913 work on the same theme. In 1962 to commemorate the 350th anniversary of the indigenous revolt against the Spanish conquistador Gil González Dávila, Grøn sculpted an image of Cacique Diriangén to depict his courage and resistance. In 1964, she sculpted a bust of Darío from white Guatemalan marble, which has become an iconic image of the poet. In the 1970s, Grøn developed mouth cancer and went to the MD Anderson Cancer Center in Houston for chemotherapy. She began losing her sight in 1981 and was forced to change to painting and inlay works with wood. Some of her most known paintings include: Muchacha en la hamaca (Girl in a hammock), Cándida, Desnudo (The nude), and Llanto después del desastre (Tears after the disaster), which was a reference to the 1972 Nicaraguan earthquake.

Numerous sculptures by Grøn adorn public places in Nicaragua, such as El Relevo, (The Relay) which is in front of the post office of Managua; a monument to Andrés Castro Estrada, which was commissioned in 1956 by students and teachers, who had trained with the educator Miguel Ramírez Goyena; a work on José Dolores Estrada which stands at the Masaya entrance to the Tiscapa Lagoon Natural Reserve; a statue of Cacique Diriangén which adorns the park Las Piedrecitas in Managua; a sculpture of Rubén Darío, located at the Central Bank of Nicaragua, which is the most reproduced depiction of the author in the country; and a bust of Darío completed in 1964, which adorns the National Theater bearing his name. Between 1959 and 1980, Grøn sculpted more than 300 works. They are held not only in Nicaragua, but in Belgium, Colombia, Costa Rica, Denmark, France, Germany, Mexico, Peru, and Spain, among other countries. She was honored with the Rubén Darío Order of Cultural Independence in 1989.

== Death and legacy ==
Grøn died from throat cancer on 15 March 1990 in Managua. In 2007, an exhibit of photographs of the sculptor and her works was presented at the Institute of Hispanic Culture of the Spanish embassy. In 2010, the Spanish writer, Joseph M. Vivó, published Edith Grön, Biografía de una Escultora (Edith Grön, Biography of a sculptor) to preserve her cultural legacy.
