= Escuela de Bellas Artes =

Escuela de Bellas Artes may refer to:

- Escuela de Bellas Artes de Ponce, Ponce, Puerto Rico
- Escuela de Bellas Artes, La Paz, Bolivia
- Escuela de Bellas Artes San Alejandro, in Marianao, Havana
- Escuela de Bellas Artes de San Fernando, in Madrid

== See also ==
- Escuela Nacional de Bellas Artes (disambiguation)
