= Belle Chasse High School =

High school in Plaquemines Parish, Louisiana, United States

Location
- 8346 Highway 23; Belle Chasse, (Plaquemines Parish), Louisiana 70037; United States; 29.8550°N 89.9866°W

Information
- Type: Public high school
- School district: Plaquemines Parish School Board
- Principal: Heather Lawson
- Staff: 65.75 (FTE)
- Enrollment: 979 (2023-2024)
- Student to teacher ratio: 14.89
- Colors: Red, white, and black
- Mascot: Cardinals
- Yearbook: Cardinal

Belle Chasse High School (BCHS) is a grade 9–12 senior high school in Belle Chasse, an unincorporated area in Plaquemines Parish, Louisiana, United States. It is a part of the Plaquemines Parish School Board.

The current school facility has multiple classroom buildings. It also houses one gymnasium, one cafeterias, an auditorium, an American football stadium, a band building, and a softball field.

== History ==
The original school building, made of brick, opened in 1928. A wooden building was later built next to the brick one. The original brick building was renovated and renamed the "Gray Building" in 1958, and that year the current main building opened. The school crest was designed in the 1970s.

At first Belle Chasse High was K–12, but in 1977 Belle Chasse Middle School opened to take the middle grades away.

In 2009–2010, the school had 882 students, and this increased to 890 by 2010–2011.

== Athletics ==
Belle Chasse High athletics competes in the LHSAA.

=== Championships ===
Football championships

- (1) State Championship: 2008

== Notable alumni ==
- Bella Blue, burlesque dancer
- Chris Henry, NFL player
- James Wright, NFL player
- Jeremy Vujnovich, NFL player
