= Escuela Nacional de Bellas Artes =

Escuela Nacional de Bellas Artes may refer to:

- Academy of Fine Arts of Bogotá, known in Colombia as the Escuela Nacional de Bellas Artes
- Academy of San Carlos, formerly known as the Escuela Nacional de Bellas Artes, Mexico City
- Escuela Nacional de Bellas Artes de Quito, in Quito, Ecuador
- Escuela Nacional de Bellas Artes (Honduras), in Comayagüela
- Escuela Nacional de Bellas Artes (Nicaragua) in Managua
- Escuela Nacional de Bellas Artes "San Alejandro" in Marianao, Havana
- Escuela Nacional Superior Autónoma de Bellas Artes, in Lima, Peru
- Faculty of Arts and Design, of the Universidad Nacional Autónoma de México, in Xochimilco, Mexico City

== See also ==
- Escuela de Bellas Artes (disambiguation)
