= James de la Rosa =

Mexican boxer

Personal information
- Nickname: The King
- Born: James Micheal de la Rosa; 18 November 1987 (age 38) Tamaulipas, Mexico
- Height: 1.78 m (5 ft 10 in)
- Weight: Welterweight; Super Welterweight; Middleweight

Boxing career
- Reach: 183 cm (72 in)
- Stance: Orthodox

Boxing record
- Total fights: 29
- Wins: 24
- Win by KO: 13
- Losses: 5
- Draws: 0
- No contests: 0

James Micheal de la Rosa (born 18 November 1987) is a Mexican professional boxer. He is currently signed with Don King.

== Early life ==
De la Rosa was born on 19 November 1987, to a Mexican father and an African-American mother.

== Professional career ==
De la Rosa's first big win came against undefeated Abel Perry by 2nd round K.O. as the headliner of a TeleFutura card. On 3 October 2008, James gave the much feared Tim Coleman the first loss of his career. In 2010, he filed for bankruptcy, which canceled out his contracts with Duva Boxing and Cavazos Boxing. De la Rosa subsequently signed a deal with Don King's promotional company.

== Personal life ==
De la Rosa is the brother of light middleweight boxer Juan de la Rosa, who was a contestant on The Contender.

== Professional record ==
23 Wins (13 Knockouts), 5 Losses, 0 Draws
Res.	Record	Opponent	Type	Rd., Time	Date	Location	Notes
Loss	23-5-0	(United States) Curtis Stevens	UD	10 (10)	November 19, 2016	(United States) T-Mobile Arena, Las Vegas, Nevada	
Loss	23-4-0	(Republic of Ireland) Jason Quigley	UD	10 (10)	May 7, 2016	(United States) T-Mobile Arena, Las Vegas, Nevada	
Loss	23-3-0	(United States) Hugo Centeno, Jr.	KO	5 (10)	December 6, 2014	(United States) Barclays Center, Brooklyn, New York	
Win	23-2-0	(Mexico) Alfredo Angulo	UD	10 (10)	September 13, 2014	(United States) MGM Grand, Las Vegas, Nevada	
Win	22-2-0	(Mexico) Fabian Reyes	TKO	7 (8)	August 8, 2014	(United States) Events Center, Pharr, Texas	
Loss	21-2-0	(United States) Marcus Wills	MD	8 (8)	April 4, 2013	(United States) Treasure Island Casino, Las Vegas, Nevada	
Win	21-1-0	(United States) Tyrone Brunson	UD	8 (8)	March 23, 2012	(United States) Convention Center, Pharr, Texas	
Loss	20-1-0	(United States) Allen Conyers	UD	10 (10)	January 11, 2011	(United States) Silverdome, Pontiac, Michigan	
Win	20-0-0	(Costa Rica) Lenin Arroyo	UD	10 (10)	October 31, 2009	(United States) Treasure Island Casino, Las Vegas, Nevada	
Win	19-0-0	(United States) Marteze Logan	DQ	6 (1:15)	March 28, 2009	(United States) Harlingen Field, Harlingen, Texas	Logan disqualified for repeatedly holding.
Win	18-0-0	(United States) Tim Coleman	UD	10 (10)	October 3, 2008	(United States) Wicomico Civic Center, Salisbury, Maryland	
Win	17-0-0	(Guyana) Troy Wilson	UD	8 (8)	June 13, 2008	(United States) Catholic Youth Center, Scranton, Pennsylvania	
Win	16-0-0	(United States) James Webb	TKO	4 (0:43)	February 8, 2008	(United States) Municipal Auditorium, Harlingen, Texas	
Win	15-0-0	(United States) Abel Perry	KO	2 (0:29)	January 18, 2008	(United States) Jacob Brown Auditorium, Brownsville, Texas	
Win	14-0-0	(Belize) Michael Soberanis	TKO	5 (2:31)	August 6, 2007	(United States) McAllen Convention Center, McAllen, Texas	
Win	13-0-0	(Mexico) Miguel Angel Galindo	TKO	3 (2:53)	April 6, 2007	(United States) Convention Center, Pharr, Texas	
Win	12-0-0	(Mexico) Francisco Rincon	UD	10 (10)	February 23, 2007	(United States) Hard Rock Hotel and Casino, Las Vegas	Won WBC Youth welterweight title
Win	11-0-0	(Namibia) Frans Hantindi	UD	6 (6)	October 21, 2006	(United States) Altas Palmas Park, Donna, Texas	
Win	10-0-0	(Mexico) Carlos De la Cruz	KO	3 (2:35)	September 23, 2006	(United States) Dodge Arena, Hidalgo, Texas	
Win	9-0-0	(Nicaragua) David Obregón	KO	3 (2:00)	August 25, 2006	(United States) Miccosukee Indian Gaming Resort, Miami	
Win	8-0-0	(United States) Anthony Wilson	TKO	3 (2:56)	August 4, 2006	(United States) Dodge Arena, Hidalgo, Texas	
Win	7-0-0	(Puerto Rico) Franchie Torres	UD	4 (4)	May 19, 2006	(United States) Fair Park Pavilion, Dallas	
Win	6-0-0	(United States) Calvin Pitts	TKO	2 (1:37)	May 5, 2006	(United States) Altas Palmas Park, Donna, Texas	
Win	5-0-0	(United States) Carlos Velasquez	TKO	1 (2:46)	March 24, 2006	(United States) Arizona Veterans Memorial Coliseum, Phoenix, Arizona	
Win	4-0-0	(United States) Andres Ramos	TKO	3 (1:21)	March 10, 2006	(United States) Dodge Arena, Hidalgo, Texas	
Win	3-0-0	(Mexico) Isidro Silva	UD	4 (4)	October 22, 2005	(United States) Alta Palmas Park, Donna, Texas	
Win	2-0-0	(United States) Antoine Hicks	TKO	1 (1:36)	July 29, 2005	(United States) Dodge Arena, Hidalgo, Texas	
Win	1-0-0	(Mexico) Francisco Reyes	KO	1 (1:02)	May 20, 2005	Tlaxcala, Tlaxcala, Mexico	

== See also ==
- Afro-Mexicans
