= New Orleans Center for Creative Arts =

Arts high school in New Orleans, Louisiana

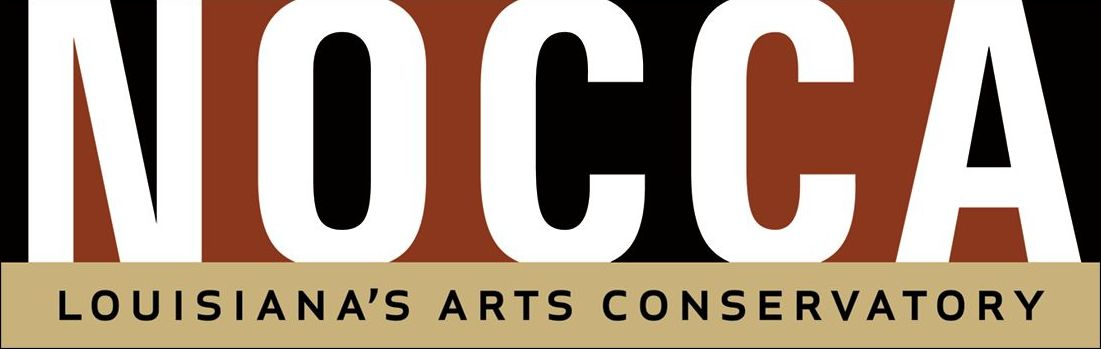

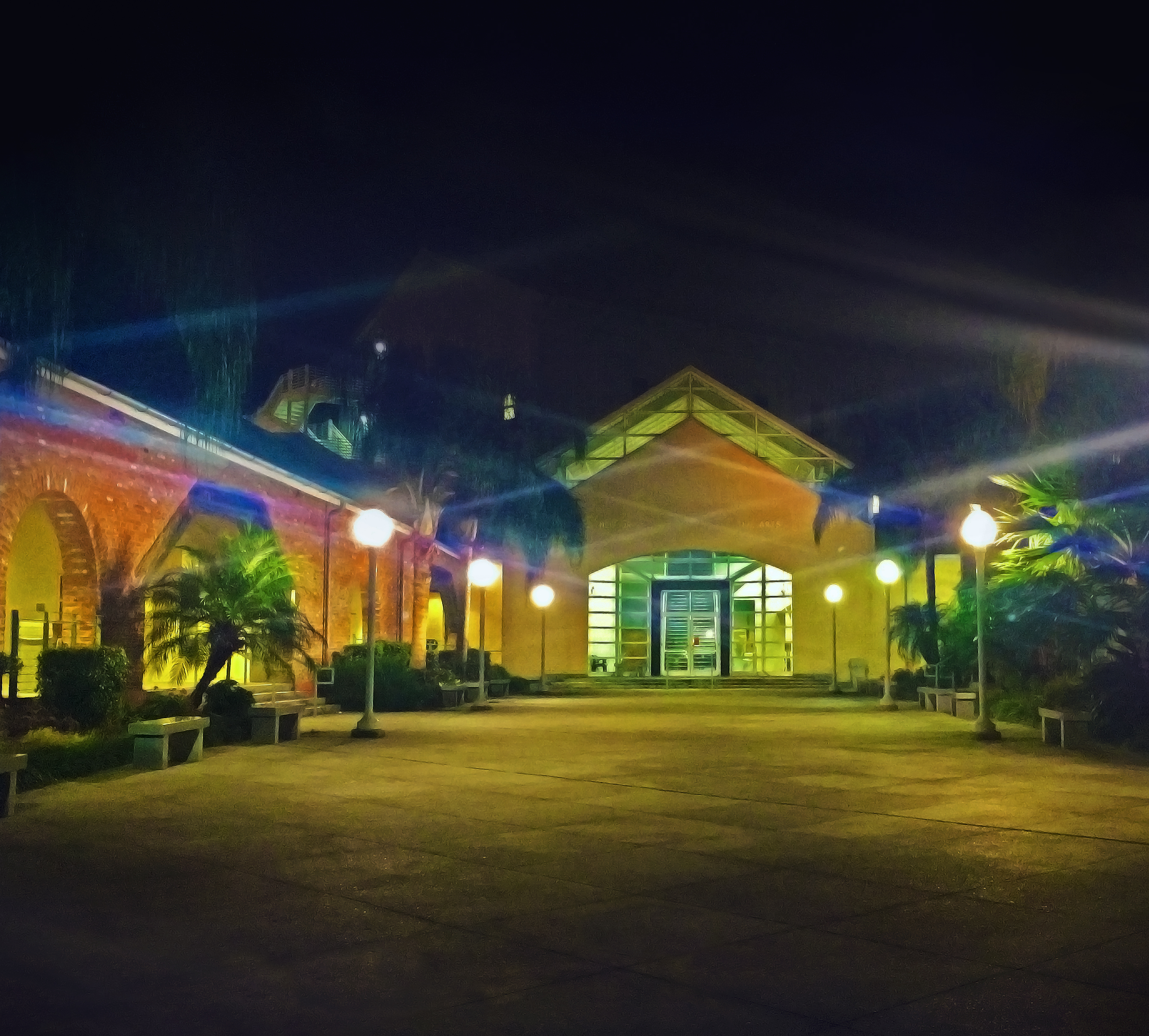

Location
- 2800 Chartres Street; New Orleans, Louisiana 70117; United States; 29°57′48.02″N 90°2′58.97″W

Information
- Type: Public
- Established: 1973
- President: Silas Cooper
- Grades: 9 to 12
- Website: nocca.com

New Orleans Center for Creative Arts, or NOCCA, is the regional, pre-professional arts training center for high school students in Louisiana. NOCCA opened in 1973 as a professional arts training center for secondary school-age children. Located in New Orleans, it provides intensive instruction in culinary arts, creative writing, dance, media arts, music (classical, jazz, vocal), theatre arts (drama, musical theatre, theatre design), and visual arts.

NOCCA was founded by a group of artists, educators, business leaders, and community activists. Tuition is free to all Louisiana students who meet audition requirements. Students from over 100 public, private, parochial and home schools attend in the afternoon or late-day as well as Academic Studio students who attend NOCCA for the full day.

In 2000, NOCCA moved to a campus in the Faubourg Marigny neighborhood. Before that, NOCCA was housed for many years in an old elementary school building on Perrier Street in Uptown New Orleans.

== Curriculum ==
NOCCA students receive pre-professional arts training in one of eleven different arts disciplines, and additionally may participate in a full-day academic program, the Academic Studio.

- Classical Instrumental Music
- Creative Writing
- Culinary Arts
- Dance
- Drama
- Entertainment Production Design
- Jazz
- Media Arts
- Musical theatre
- Visual Arts
- Vocal music

Launched in the fall of 2011, NOCCA's Academic Studio is a full-day, diploma-granting attendance option. To enroll in the Academic Studio, prospective students must successfully complete an arts audition and be accepted into a Level I program in one of NOCCA's eleven arts disciplines. Students that have gotten accepted into Academic Studio may also have to do a high school placement test.

== Admissions process ==
NOCCA acceptance is by audition only. Students can also apply for full day when they get accepted.

== Notable alumni ==
- Troy "Trombone Shorty" Andrews, musician
- Jon Batiste, musician
- Lauren Bernofsky, composer
- Terence Blanchard, musician
- Bella Blue, dancer
- Harry Connick Jr., musician and actor
- Nicole Cooley, novelist and poet
- Emilie Louise Gossiaux, artist
- Donald Harrison, musician
- Anthony Mackie, actor
- Branford, Wynton, Delfeayo, and Jason Marsalis, musicians
- Nicholas Payton, musician
- Wendell Pierce, actor
- DJ Hollygrove, DJ and Radio personality on Shade 45

== NOCCA Foundation ==
The NOCCA Foundation is NOCCA’s nonprofit partner, providing supplemental funding for NOCCA and advocacy for its world-class program. Some of the Foundation’s more notable endeavors include: a Student Success Program that pays for students’ classroom supplies as well as fees associated with important summer training programs across the country; an Artists-in-Residence Program that brings more than 100 professional visiting artists into NOCCA’s classrooms each year; the capital campaign for NOCCA’s current home and expansion projects like Press Street Gardens; a wide array of arts classes for adults; and concert, gallery, and literary events for the community. The Foundation also oversees rentals of the NOCCA campus, making it available to arts organizations, individuals, corporations, and other groups.
