= James Quesada =

James Quesada (born August 29, 1953) is a Nicaraguan American Anthropologist and professor at San Francisco State University's Department of Anthropology. (Ph.D. University of California, San Francisco/University of California, Berkeley). His work focuses on cultural and medical anthropology, the ethnography of structural and political violence, social Suffering, critical medical anthropology, urban anthropology, culture change, transnational migration and refugee migration, North America, Central America, and the inner city.

He is currently Director and Principal Investigator of the Latino Laborers Initiative at the César E. Chávez Institute at San Francisco State University. He was the Chair of the Department of Anthropology at San Francisco State University between 2004 and 2007. He is currently Professor Emeritus in the Department of Anthropology at San Francisco State University.
