= Omar D'León =

Nicaraguan painter and poet (1929–2022)

- Born: Omar D'León Lacayo y Estrada; 1929; Managua, Nicaragua
- Died: August 26, 2022 (aged 93); Camarillo, California, U.S.
- Education: Escuela Nacional de Bellas Artes, Nicaragua
- Known for: Painting, poetry
- Movement: Impressionism

Omar D'León (1929 – August 26, 2022) was a Nicaraguan painter and poet.

D'León was born Omar D'León Lacayo y Estrada in 1929 in Managua, Nicaragua.

D'León studied nine years at the Escuela Nacional de Bellas Artes in Nicaragua under its director Rodrigo Peñalba. His early inspiration were the frescos of Pompeii, where he saw the use of cross-hatching and applied this technique to his love of the Impressionist school.

He founded a museum in Managua in 1970 named "Museo-Galeria 904". The museum's collection encompassed the arts of Nicaragua from pre-Hispanic to contemporary. In the earthquake of December. 1972, D'León's museum and studio were partly destroyed and later ransacked, vandalized and robbed. After the Sandinistas took power in Nicaragua, he moved to Camarillo, California .

In 1982, one of his paintings was reproduced in the form of a UNICEF stamp. His paintings are housed in many museums such as the Art Museum of the Americas in Washington, D.C., at the Ponce Museum of Art in Puerto Rico, at the Museum of Latin American Art in Long Beach, the Chicago Art Institute and the José Luis Cuevas Museum in Mexico City.

D'León died in Camarillo, California on August 26, 2022, aged 93.
