= Christianne Meneses Jacobs =

Nicaraguan-American writer

- Born: 28 March 1971 (age 55); Managua, Nicaragua
- Occupations: Publisher, Editor, Teacher & Writer
- Spouse: Marc Jacobs

Christianne Meneses Jacobs (born March 28, 1971) is a Nicaraguan American writer, editor, and teacher. She is the publisher of Iguana; a Spanish language magazine for children.

== Early life and education ==
Meneses Jacobs was born in Managua, Nicaragua. Her mother Thelma was a legal secretary, and her father, Enrique, was a lawyer and vice president of the National Liberal Party, who had been jailed more than once in Nicaragua for political reasons. Her grandfather was Dr. Ildefonso Palma Martinez; a lawyer, law professor and a justice of the Nicaraguan Supreme Court. Due to the Sandinista National Liberation Front and their coup d'état, fighting and food shortages were massive problems during her childhood. The Sandinista revolution occurred when Meneses Jacobs was eight years old.

Despite a privileged upbringing, attending private school and ballet lessons, with domestic servants managing childcare, cooking, driving, gardening, cleaning, laundry, and ironing. Her childhood was not without hardship. Food was rationed, with the family's card granting only "one pound of beans, one pound of sugar, and one quart of oil per person in the household for a two-week period".

On March 19, 1988, 17-year-old Meneses Jacobs and her family fled Nicaragua amid political tensions. Her father, an attorney, had previously represented an American pilot whose plane was shot down by Sandinista forces in December 1987. The pilot was accused of being a CIA agent, furthering the family's anxieties and prompting their escape Permitted to take only $500 with them, they began a new life in Los Angeles, California.

After her family settled in Los Angeles, her parents worked at the Los Angeles International Airport and she attended Los Angeles High School, where she served as editor in Chief of both the Spanish and English newspapers. Her biggest difficulty when moving to the US was the language barrier. She was placed in 10th grade at Los Angeles High School because she did not speak English well. She credits her high school teachers in helping her to overcome her difficulty with the language. She was inspired by Today in L.A. anchorwoman Carla Aragon, whom she developed a friendship with for several years. She enjoyed her new home in the U.S and the idea of meritocracy and the American Dream. She graduated from L.A. High when she was 20 years old.

Meneses Jacobs received a four-year scholarship to Wesleyan University in Middletown, Connecticut. At Wesleyan University, Meneses Jacobs majored in Government with an emphasis in International Relations.

== Career ==
Meneses Jacobs began her career as a second grade elementary school teacher in Los Angeles after graduating from Wesleyan In 2001, Meneses Jacobs received a Master of Arts degree in Education, and in 2005 she received her Reading Specialist Certification. She was a bilingual teacher for several years in Los Angeles before the program was eliminated by a statewide proposition.

In 2007, Meneses Jacobs was awarded $5,000 as one of 10 honorees of the Anna Maria Arias Memorial Business Fund, which recognizes entrepreneurial Latinas.

Meneses Jacobs is President of NicaGal, LLC. She continues to work as an educator, currently teaching middle school in Phoenix, Arizona.

Meneses Jacobs wrote the book “Professional Life Skills for Young Adults: 7 Keys to Empower Career Readiness” which was published in 2025.

== Personal life ==
Meneses Jacobs was raised Catholic but converted to Judaism in March 1998, after graduating college. In October 1998, she married graphic artist Marc Jacobs, and they had their first daughter, Isabelle, in 2002, and their second, Katherine, in 2005.

She moved to Arizona in 2002 and currently resides in Scottsdale, Arizona with her husband and their two daughters.

== Published magazines ==
=== Iguana ===
Iguana was a Spanish language magazine aimed at children ages 7–12 who grow up learning and speaking Spanish. Meneses Jacobs founded Iguana Magazine with her husband, Marc, and its first issue came out in 2005. Meneses Jacobs served as the editor and her husband served at the art director. The magazine was published by Cricket, but ceased publication in December 2014.

The magazine was created because Meneses Jacobs and her husband had a hard time teaching their children how to read Spanish. The only educational materials available at the time were poorly translated books from English to Spanish. The couple personally financed the launch of the magazine through their own savings. By 2007 the magazine had a core group of 30 writers and 35 illustrators.

Iguana featured fictional stories with characters, experiences, and settings that are familiar to the targeted readership. Additionally, it presented biographies and interviews with personalities that influenced the lives of Latinos in America, historical articles, stories about children around the world, science articles with experiments to try at home, nature articles, recipes, craft projects, and reader-submitted works.

The magazine received the 2009 Multicultural Children's Publication Award from the National Association for Multicultural Education.

=== ¡YO SÉ! ===
¡YO SÉ! (meaning "I Know!"), created after Iguana, is a Spanish-language children's magazine which includes articles about popular culture, short stories, nature, biographies and interviews with Latino personalities. It debuted nationwide at the end of January 2008 and was freely distributed in Spanish-language newspapers of Hoy Fin de Semana (weekend edition) in Los Angeles and Chicago and in El Sentinel in Orlando and South Florida (Broward/Palm Beach counties), with a monthly distribution of over 750,000 copies.
