= Horacio Peña (author) =

Horacio Peña (born 1936 in Managua, Nicaragua) is a professor, writer, and poet.

Currently an instructor at Huston-Tillotson College and the Seminary of the Southwest—both in Austin, Texas, he is often recognized as the most important Nicaraguan American poet.. His poems have appeared in numerous publications, including "El Pez y La Serpiente" (The Fish and the Serpent), La Prensa Literaria (The Literary Press), both from Nicaragua; Cuadernos Hispanoamericanos (Hispanic American Notebooks) from Madrid; Papeles de Son Armadans, from Palma de Mayorca; Linden Lanemagazine, from Texas, and others.

A translator from the English, Italian, and French, he was a professor of Cultural History at the National University of Nicaragua for many years. In 1967 he won the prestigious Ruben Dario International Poetry Prize for his long poem "Ars Moriendi"; an anniversary bi-lingual publication ISBN 978-1-892820-15-0 of which was published in 2004.
