= 12 Corazones =

- Presented by: Penélope Menchaca; Maximiliano Palacio (2010-2012); Edward'O (2005-2017)
- Opening theme: "Club Havana" by Richard Iacona (2006-2010)
- Country of origin: United States
- No. of seasons: 18

Production
- Camera setup: Videotape; Multi-camera
- Running time: 60 minutes
- Production companies: Promofilm, Inc.

Original release
- Network: Telemundo
- Release: January 2005 – September 2017

12 Corazones (Spanish pronunciation: [ˈdose koɾaˈsones], 12 Hearts) is a Spanish-language dating game show produced in the United States for the television network Telemundo from 2005 to 2017, based on its namesake Argentine TV show format. The show was filmed in Los Angeles and revolved around the twelve Zodiac signs that identify each contestant. The show was hosted by Penélope Menchaca and featured advice from co-host Maximiliano Palacio, an Argentine former soccer player turned actor, and Edward'O, an astrologist; Palacio and Edward'O appeared alternately in some episodes and simultaneously in others.

In August 2009, Telemundo added English subtitles as closed captions on CC3, airing on Universo in that format.

== Show format ==
The show consists of 12 contestants divided into two groups (usually four males and eight females, but sometimes vice versa). Each of the contestants is identified and referred to by his/her Zodiac sign. In between segments, Maximiliano Palacio offers love and relationship advice to the contestants.

== Nature of the show ==
Most episodes commonly feature a themed format, often involving the contestants (and often, host Penelope Menchaca, as well) in costume; themes used on 12 Corazones include beach-themed episodes in which contestants appear in beachwear, and a beauty pageant-style themed episodes, among others.

=== First segment ===
After their introduction, the males interact in a mock play, or they are asked to perform a stunt, usually for their ridicule (sing a song, recite a goofy poem, etc.) Then, the host begins a roundtable of discussion on a certain subject. After this is finished, the first group is taken out of the room and the second group decide to eliminate one of their contestants.

=== Second segment ===
On the second segment, a chosen male or female from the main group is eliminated. Soon afterward, the male or female suitors are introduced (identified by their astrological sign, hometown and occupation; though this portion sometimes is not included), the host then chooses a contestant of each group to interact in a closer way, for example dancing, kissing, etc. To decide what kind of interaction will take place, the host uses some sort of game like a "roulette of kisses", or two special dice. This is followed by a second roundtable of discussion. Then, each of the male contestants eliminates a female contestant of the other group. This leaves only three contestants in the main group and five contestants on the group of suitors.

=== Final segment ===
For the final segment, the host picks a contestant of the second group who is supposed to pick their heart among the male or female contestants. The contestant chosen has the option to accept or reject. The rules of the show allow the contestant of the second group to pick their heart among the contestants from the first group who have already chosen another person from the second group (an example occurred in an episode originally broadcast on January 20, 2011, in which the same male contestant was chosen by each of the five remaining female suitors; the male contestant chose each of the females, effectively rejecting the previously chosen females in the process, also as per the rules of the show).

Instances in which a person from the first group chooses the person from the second over the person they have already chosen do occur from time to time, but less commonly in episodes in which the first group consists of four females at the start of the show.

== Winner ==
When the couples are chosen (usually 1-3 couples) the audience votes for their favorite. The host Penélope Menchaca then calls the winner by the color chair they are sitting in. The winners get a free paid date courtesy of the show. When the winner is chosen they get to kiss again in front of the stage which concludes the program.

== Notable contestants ==
- Dallas Malloy, female boxer and actress
- Eva Marie, WWE Diva and model
- DJ Trevi, American DJ, producer, and actor

== See also ==
- Dating game show
- 12 Corazones: Rumbo al Altar
