= Bella Blue =

American burlesque dancer

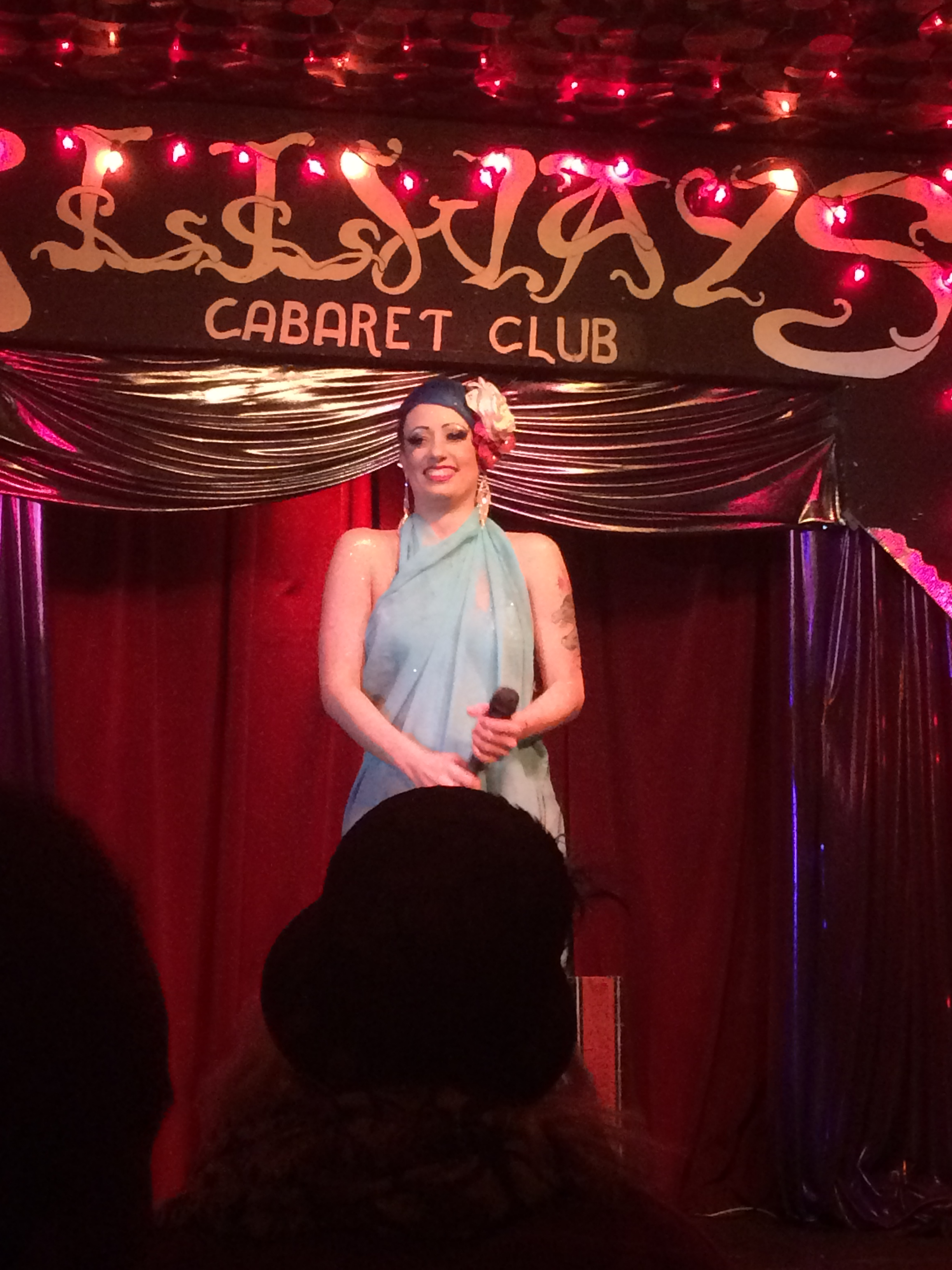
- Bella Blue performing in the Dirty Dime Peepshow in 2017
- Born: January 25, 1982 (age 43); New Orleans, Louisiana, U.S.
- Education: Belle Chasse High School
- Occupations: Burlesque dancer, dance teacher, dance producer
- Children: 2
- Website: www.thebellalounge.com

Bella Blue (born January 25, 1982) is an American burlesque dancer and producer. She is the founder and headmistress of the New Orleans School of Burlesque.

== Early life ==
Bella Blue was born on January 25, 1982, in New Orleans, Louisiana, to Barbara Leopold and Pedro Bendaña. Her father, a Nicaraguan, immigrated to the United States with his mother, Yolanda, when he was five years old. Blue's parents met in high school and later married. They divorced when she was two years old and her mother remarried. Her father worked as a barber. Her mother died on February 20, 2010, from an aortic aneurism.

Blue began studying dance when she was three years old. She grew up in Belle Chasse and went to Catholic school until high school, when she switched to the public Belle Chasse High School, graduating in 2000. She continued her dance training at the New Orleans Center for Creative Arts.

== Career ==
Blue trained in classical ballet and modern dance techniques and worked as a teacher of ballet and modern dance prior to being introduced to burlesque in 2007. Blue auditioned for Trixie Minx's burlesque troupe Fleur de Tease, making her debut as one of their dancers in February 2007 under the name Jazzabella Blue, later dropping the "Jazza" from her name. Blue later quit her day job as a dental assistant and began dancing full-time. She started her own burlesque troupe, The Foxglove Revue, and is the founder and headmistress of the New Orleans School of Burlesque. She produces and directs the Dirty Dime Peepshow, Whiskey and Rhinestones, The New Orleans School of Burlesque Student Showcase, Strip Roulette, Legs and Eggs Burlesque Brunch, and several other large scale shows in New Orleans and the across the United States. Along with burlesque, Blue has also previously worked as an exotic dancer and in 2017 became a certified yoga teacher.

In January 2015, Blue debuted sixteenth in the Burlesque Top 50 by 21st Century Magazine, consistently ranking in the top 20 for over three years.

In 2016, Blue was crowned the Unicorn Queen in the Chewbacchus parade during Mardi Gras.

=== New Orleans School of Burlesque ===
In 2008, Blue hosted a burlesque workshop in a dance studio on the West Bank of New Orleans. Eventually the workshop grew into New Orleans' only burlesque school, offering weekly burlesque classes. Students at the school are taught burlesque technique, character, costuming, and history. Blue is the headmistress of the school and also teaches at the school. The school is located in St. Claude, New Orleans.

=== Lucky Pierre's controversy ===
Blue was a producer of The Blue Book, a burlesque show at the club Lucky Pierre's on Bourbon Street in the French Quarter. After one of her dancers, Ruby Rage, was dismissed from performing at the club reportedly due to her body type and appearance, Blue decided to cancel the show and leave Lucky Pierre's. Blue had not been informed of the club's decision to drop Rage until after she had been dismissed.

== Personal life ==
Blue identifies as queer and was married October 2023 to Andrew Principe. Blue has two sons, one of which was diagnosed with Aspergers.
