= Michael Cordúa =

American restaurateur

- Born: 1961 (age 64–65); Managua, Nicaragua
- Occupations: restaurateur, entrepreneur

Michael Cordúa (born 1961) is a Nicaraguan-born American restaurateur, entrepreneur, former owner of Cordúa Restaurants, and award-winning self-taught chef. Cordúa is the former owner of six restaurants in the Houston, Texas area. He was the first to introduce Houston to Latin American cuisine that was not Mexican.

== Personal life ==
Cordúa was born in Managua, Nicaragua and later moved to Houston, Texas. He graduated with a degree in Economics and Finance from Texas A&M University in 1980. Cordúa worked for a Houston shipping firm until it was liquidated in the late 1980s. After arriving in Houston, Cordúa taught himself to cook, he has said "The whole reason I got into cooking was because I missed the foods from home".

He was named honorary consul of Nicaragua in Houston in 2004. Cordúa married his Nicaraguan sweetheart Lucia in 1980 and has 4 children David, Michelle, Elisa, and Cristina.

== Career ==
Cordúa, with inspiration from his uncle's restaurant in Managua and despite having no previous experience in the restaurant business, opened his first 130-seat restaurant, Churrascos, on August 8, 1988. Churrascos was an upscale South American-style restaurant. Four months in, Cordúa was ready to give up due to the restaurant losing money. Many critics, such as the New York Times, praised the new restaurant and in 1989 Churrascos was listed in Esquire magazine's "Best New Restaurants in America". Fred Smith, a banker from First National Bank, decided to help him expand after eating at his restaurant. Cordúa took the help and opened a second Churrascos near the downtown Houston area. The second 175-seat Churrascos was opened in 1990 and emphasized a Central American churrasco that made up half of its sales. In 1997 Cordúa opened a third Churrascos in Chicago. It received great reviews from critics, however, after 8 months it closed down when Cordúas partner backed out.

Cordúa went on to open 3 other restaurants; Américas in 1993, Amazón Grill in 1999 (2 locations) and Artista in 2002, all of which have received various awards. Cordúa opened another location for his Américas restaurant in 2008 and also owns a catering company, Cordúa catering.

== Awards and recognition ==
Cordúa and his restaurants have received much recognition and many awards throughout the years. He was named by Food & Wine as one of America's "Top Ten Chefs" and is received the Robert Mondavi Award for Culinary Excellence in 1994. His restaurant, Churrascos, was named Best South American Restaurant by the Houston Press in 2005.

Cordúas awards

- AMA "Marketer of the Year" 2007 Finalist
- Hope Award for Individual Philanthropy 2007 - Susan G. Komen Foundation
- "Houston's Greatest" businesses for 2005 - The Greater Houston Partnership
- 2005 Star Award Winner for exceptional business performance and community service - Houston West Chamber Of Commerce
- 2004 Best Chefs List – H Texas magazine
- "Male Entrepreneur of the Year" Houston Hispanic Chamber of Commerce 2004
- Fast Cooking special issue Food & Wine March 2004

Artista (Restaurant)

- "Best Restaurant View" Citysearch.com 2005
- Best Décor/Atmosphere – Houston Business Journal 2005
- Best Pre- or Post-Theater Restaurant – Houston Press 2004
- #1 Best New Texas Restaurant - Texas Monthly Feb 2004

Churrascos (Restaurant)

- Best South American Restaurant 2005 - Houston Press
- Best All Around Restaurant – AOL City Guide 2005

Américas (Restaurant)

- Wine & Food Week "Sweet & Savory" 2007 - H Texas Magazine
- "50 Best Hispanic Restaurants" Hispanic Magazine 2005
- "Best Latin Restaurant" H Texas Magazine 2005
- "Best Appetizers" Houston Business Journal 2005
- "Best Appetizers" Houston Business Journal 2004

Amazón Grill (Restaurant)

- Best Margarita – Westchase District 2005
- Best Plantains 2005 – Houston Press
- Best Business Lunch 2005 – Houston Business Journal
- Top 50 Hispanic Restaurants – Hispanic Magazine 2004

== See also ==
- Nicaraguan American
- Cuisine of Nicaragua
- Churrasco
- Chimichurri
