= Trixie Minx =

American burlesque dancer and healthcare advocate

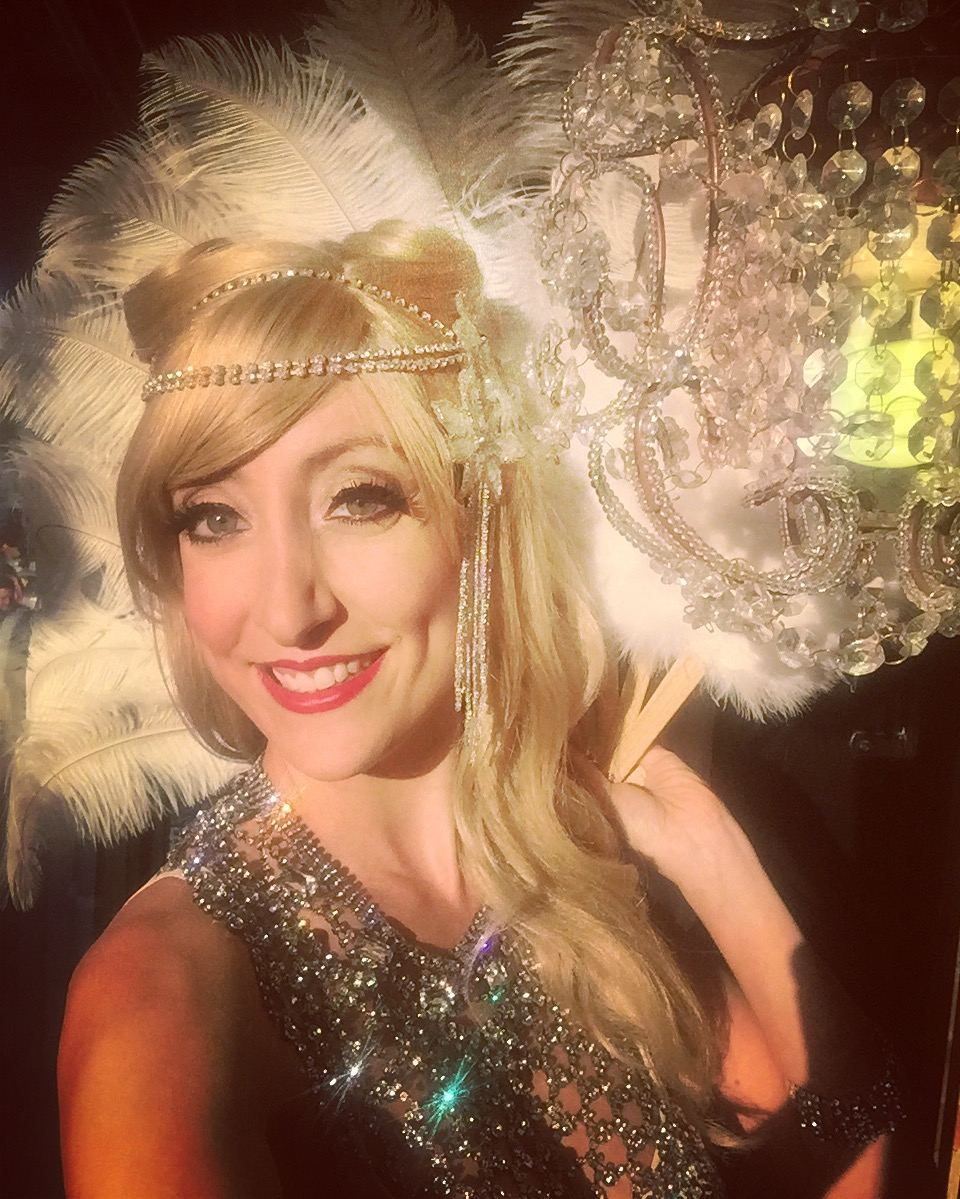

Trixie Minx is a burlesque dancer, producer, healthcare advocate, and cultural ambassador based in New Orleans, Louisiana. As a performer she is best known for her unique style of striptease combining comedy with classic burlesque. She is well known for her collaborations with musicians and charitable organizations (such as Comic Relief, Preservation Hall Jazz Band, The New Orleans Bingo! Show, Ascona Jazz Festival, and New Orleans Musicians' Clinic) as well as her devotion to preservation and growth of New Orleans arts and culture. She produces multiple New Orleans–based circus art and burlesque shows and designs custom entertainment for both public and private events.

== Early life ==
Born on May 5, 1981, in Miami, Florida, she was enamored with ballet as a child. She began her training locally at Miami Ballet, Martha Mahr's School of Ballet, and later as a teenager with New World School of the Arts and Miami City Ballet School as a scholarship student. Summers were spent studying her craft at Houston Ballet Academy (1993 and 1994), with Suzanne Farrell at the Kennedy Center (1995, 1996), and at the American Ballet Theatre (1996, 1997, 1998). Upon graduating high school she joined Nashville Ballet as a trainee where she danced for two years until an ankle injury and eating disorder abruptly ended her career as a ballerina. In 2001 she moved to New Orleans, where she worked as a Pilates instructor, and started exploring alternate dance styles (including swing, folk dance, and eventually burlesque). Post-Hurricane Katrina she decided to devote her life to burlesque and New Orleans as Trixie Minx.

== Burlesque ==
Trixie's first performance as burlesque dancer was in December 2005. Trixie Minx started as a regular cast member in Bustout Burlesque at Tipitina's where she performed for six months. Wanting to explore the creative versatility through the art of tease she began producing her own shows in September 2006. An active member of the New Orleans Burlesque revival, Trixie continued to create shows and has since gone on to perform throughout the world.

=== Productions ===
Trixie Minx currently produces several ongoing productions in New Orleans. Fleur de Tease, Burgundy Burlesque, Burlesque Ballroom, and her Cabaret series at the Orpheum Theater. She created Fantasy for Couples Cruises which sails the Gulf and the Caribbean. Trixie also performs in The Burlesque Show at the Borgata Casino in Atlantic City, New Jersey.

==== Cabaret Series at Orpheum Theater ====
In 2016 the recently renovated Orpheum Theater approached Trixie to create a series of shows to bring back the glamour of the once lost eras of vaudeville and vintage burlesque on the stage. Her productions Cupid's Cabaret and Cocktail Cabaret were noteworthy in that they were large scale artistic productions featuring burlesque, actors, musicians, aerialists, and performance artists on a grand stage, further validating the work of these performers in New Orleans to have artistic merit beyond simple entertainment.

==== Burlesque Ballroom ====
Burlesque Ballroom debuted in December 2010 and continues to run weekly every Friday at the Royal Sonesta New Orleans on Bourbon Street. This intimate production turns the Jazz Playhouse into a burlesque speakeasy where dancers perform throughout the room to live jazz and blues music. Featuring a rotating cast of New Orleans and international touring burlesque performers, this is a unique perspective on the various types of beauty and styles of classic burlesque. Historically, Burlesque Ballroom is significant as it is the only weekly show where burlesque and live music come together once again as it did during the original heyday of 1950s Bourbon Street burlesque culture.

==== Burgundy Burlesque ====
Originally created in 2011 as Creole Sweet Tease, this show was reorganized as Burgundy Burlesque in December 2015 by co-founders Trixie Minx, Kerry Lewis, and Gerald French of the Original Tuxedo Jazz Band. With a heavy influence on the music of New Orleans past and present this production showcases a cast of burlesque dancers that perform in collaboration with the musicians in an improvisational manner. This show runs weekly at the Saint Hotel and Autograph Collection on Canal Street, New Orleans.

==== The Burlesque Show ====
Produced by Allen Valentine, The Burlesque Show, is in its 4th season at the Borgata Hotel and Casino in Atlantic City, New Jersey. Trixie Minx is a featured burlesque performer in this high energy show that combines burlesque with comic skits, choreographed numbers, and other prominent burlesque dancers Hazel Honeysuckle, Media Noche, Piper Marie, and Rosy Cheeks.

==== Fantasy ====
Designed in 2014 for Couples Cruise, Fantasy is an exotic interpretation on all that is sensual and erotic. This variety style show features contortionists, acro balancers, aerialists in acts that focus on the human experiences of love and lust.

==== Fleur de Tease ====
Trixie Minx's first and flagstaff production, Fleur de Tease started in September 2006 out of her desire to explore a more theatrical and comical side to burlesque within a group dynamic. With a cast of dancers, comedians, magicians, and aerialists Fleur de Tease brings a new elaborate theme show to One Eyed Jacks on Toulouse Street in New Orleans each month (formerly the ShimSham where Ronnie Magri and the Shimshammettes began). Fleur de Tease has become synonymous with the definition of New Orleans Burlesque and has been featured at the New Orleans Jazz & Heritage Festival (with Preservation Hall, Better than Ezra), New Orleans Food & Wine Experience, Tales of the Cocktail, Voodoo Music Experience.

== Filmography ==
Year	Title	Role	Media	Notes
2010	The Jack of Spades	Burlesque Dancer	Film	
2012	Jack and the Dead Girl	Temptation	Film	
2012	The Singer	Sarah Sparkles	Film (short)	
2012	Common Law	Blaze	Television	Season 1 Episode 7: Role Play
2014	Sami Yaffa – Sound Tracker	Herself	Television (documentary)	United States of America part 7
2015	Close Up Kings	Herself	Television (reality)	Episode 2

== Awards and titles ==
Year	Award/Title
2008	HEEB Top 100
2009	New Orleans Magazine People to Watch
2011	Shalom Life Top 20 Jews in the Arts
2014	Music Advocate
2015	Empress of the Insane – Krewe Delusion
2015	Thrillist Best New Orleans Instagrams
2015	Host of the Big Easy Awards
2015	Thrillist 10 Sexiest Things to do in New Orleans
2015	Performer Healthcare Advocate
2015	Gambit's 40 under 40
2016	Greasing of the Poles Winner
2016	Inaugural Queen of the National Underwear Day Parade
