= Mari Ramos =

American weather anchor

Mari Ramos is a Nicaraguan American weather anchor for CNN International in Atlanta, Georgia. She presents weather segments on CNN Newsroom, News Stream, World Business Today, and the International Desk. Ramos also appears occasionally on CNN/US, Headline News and Airport Network. She also presents special severe weather reports on CNN en Español.

== Biography ==
Ramos was born in Chinandega, Nicaragua, but moved to the United States when she was only 8 years old.

Ramos received a Bachelor of Arts degree in communications and broadcast journalism from Florida International University in Miami. Currently, Ramos is working toward Broadcast Meteorologist Certification from Mississippi State University.

Ramos began her broadcasting career at WPLG, an ABC affiliate in Miami, where, as an intern, she practiced newsgathering and writing for the station's evening newscasts. Ramos worked at The Weather Channel as an on-camera meteorologist and reporter for the Latin America division of the network, before joining CNN in 1999.

She is fluent in English and Spanish and speaks conversational French.
