= Donald Vega =

Jazz pianist and music composer

- Born: Donald Vega Gutierrez; July 23, 1974 (age 51); Masaya, Nicaragua
- Genres: Jazz
- Occupation: Musician
- Instrument: Piano
- Website: www.donaldvega.com

Donald Vega is a Nicaraguan-born American jazz pianist and music composer.

== Early life ==
Vega was born in Masaya, Nicaragua, a town well known for its handicrafts. He was born with a severe cleft palate, for which he has had many surgeries to correct and save his hearing. He fled the country at the age of 15, arriving in Los Angeles in 1989. Vega attended high school at Crenshaw High School. In the late 1990s he was at risk of being returned to his native country as a consequence of the Immigration Reform Act of 1996. With the aid of friends and supporters, he is now a legal resident.

Donald Vega was trained classically in piano in his native Nicaragua. When he emigrated to the United States at age 15 he found a musical home with the Colburn School. He began his studies there in classical piano with Teresa de Jong Pombo and Dr. Louis Lepley. Vega began learning the language of jazz from mentor Billy Higgins at The World Stage and continued at CSPA with Jeffrey Lavner, then later with bassist John Clayton at the University of Southern California. During his time in Los Angeles Donald was mentored by and performed with the celebrated conguero Francisco Aguabella as well as notable bassist Al McKibbon. He went on to graduate from Manhattan School of Music and The Juilliard School where he studied with pianist Kenny Barron, Phil Markowitz and Gary Dial.

Vega is a professor at the Juilliard School, living in New York City.

== Career ==
Vega performs internationally as the pianist for bassist Ron Carter’s Golden Striker Trio (which also featured guitarist Russell Malone until his death in August 2024), with whom he has recorded several albums. Mr. Vega is also a professor at The Juilliard School and sits on the board of BackCountry Jazz, a non-profit organization which provides music education programs and performances to underprivileged youth.

Some of his competitive winnings include The Los Angeles Music Center's Spotlight Award in 1991, Down Beat's 2007 Jazz Student Soloist Award and 1st place at the 2008 Philips Jazz Piano Competition at the University of West Florida, as well as an original composition featured in the CD accompanying JAZZIZ's October 2008 Education Issue. He was named a Guggenheim Fellow for Music Composition in 2023.

== Discography ==
=== As leader ===
- As I Travel (2023)
- With Respect To Monty (2015)
- Spiritual Nature (2012)
- Tomorrows (2008)

=== As sideman ===
- Kirk Edwards: The AKA Project (2022)
- Eric Wyatt: A Song of Hope (2021)
- Shirley Crabbe: Bridges (2018)
- Dan Adler: Friends On The Moon (2018)
- Ron Carter with Donald Vega & Russell Malone: Golden Striker (Live at Theaterstübchen Kassel) (2017)
- Brandon Lee: Common Thread (2017)
- Letizia Gambi: Blue Monday (2016)
- Clarence Penn: Monk: The Lost Files (2014)
- Lauren Meccia: Inside Your Eyes (2014)
- Jason Stewart: Cyclicality (2013)
- Ron Carter Trio: Cocktails At The Cotton Club (2012)
- Clifton Anderson: And so We Carry On (2012)
- Bryan Carter: Enchantment (2011)
- Claudio Roditi: Bons Amigos (2011)
- Shirley Crabbe: Home (Produced by Donald Vega) (2011)
- Behn Gillece and Ken Fowser: Duotone (2011)
- Village Orchestra Playaz, Alfredo Rivera & DJK: Black Maya Voodo (2010)
- Karen Francis: Nostalgia (2010)
- Brandon Lee: Absolute-lee (2010)
- Bennie Wallace: Disorder at the Border (2007)
- Anthony Wilson: Power of Nine (2007)
- Ryan Cross and Lorca Hart: Cross Hart Jazz Experience (2006)
- Justo Almario: Love Thy Neighbor (2004)
- Jose Rizo's Jazz on the Latin Side All-Stars: The Last Bull Fighter 2004
- Francisco Aguabella: Ochimini (2004)
- Al McKibbon: Black Orchid (2003)
- Ronald Muldrow: Mapenzi 2003
- Francisco Aguabella: Cubacan (2002)
- Francisco Aguabella: Agua de Cuba (1999)
- Anthony Wilson: Adult Themes (1999)
