= Oswaldo Castillo =

Nicaraguan actor (died 2021)

Oswaldo Castillo (d. March 19, 2021), also known as Ozzie Castillo, was a Nicaraguan American gardener/construction worker-turned-actor.

Castillo was born in Nicaragua and, in 1986, fled to the United States after being tortured by Somoza militants for suspected opposition activities. Castillo left Nicaragua in 1979. He settled in Los Angeles, California, and worked in construction, where he later met Adam Carolla in 1989. The two became good friends.

Castillo was the co-star of The Hammer. He played "Oz", a character which is based on his real life while working in construction with Adam Carolla. Castillo and Carolla met while working in construction together and building the Bodies in Motion gym in Pasadena, where they shot the movie. Castillo continued as Carolla's gardener and was asked to appear in Carolla's independent film to play a character based on himself.

He also appeared as a cast member on The Adam Carolla Project working with Adam Carolla as a member of a construction crew.

Castillo was a movie reviewer on the number one podcast The Adam Carolla Show. He participated in segments like "Ozzie's Movie Review", "Nicaraguan Name That Tune", and "Nicaraguan Movie Quote Game." The fun in these games is in trying to understand what Ozzie is saying through his thick accent.
