= Joseph Deville Degoutin Bellechasse =

North American colonial-territorial administrator (1761–1837?)

- Born: June 21, 1761
- Died: 9 october 1838

Joseph Deville Degoutin Bellechasse (June 21, 1761 –October 9, 1838 ) was a native of New Orleans who held various positions of responsibility in colonial and territorial governments. There are many recorded variations and misspellings of his name; he signed the 1812 Louisiana constitution as J. D. Degoutin Bellechasse. His forefathers were Acadians who relocated to Louisiana. He served in the Spanish colonial militia, stationed at many frontier outposts along the Mississippi River and Gulf of Mexico. He was credited with the construction of what came to be known as Fort St. Stephens. He was the commandant at Fort San Fernando De Las Barrancas at present-day Memphis in 1796 and 1797. He retired from the Spanish military after more than 20 years of service with a modest pension; he was denied a license for "unlimited trade" as part of his retirement package, which may have contributed to his apparent dislike of interim governor Casa Calvo. In the 1830s he provided a deposition for the Myra Clark Gaines case in which he described governor William C. C. Claiborne as having been "'weak-minded' and his policies as 'not wise or conciliatory'." Nonetheless, Bellechasse had been appointed the head of the Orleans territorial militia in 1803 and served until 1808, and in 1805 he was appointed for a five-year term on the Orleans territorial council. He was also seated for multiple one-year terms on the New Orleans city council during this same period. He participated in Louisiana's first constitutional convention of 1811–1812. He lived at Bellechasse plantation from before 1806 until 1814, when he moved to Cuba and became a sugar plantation owner in Mantanzas Province. The name Belle Chase was retained on the plantation after his departure. The 5,000-acre plantation on the west bank of the Mississippi River, six miles below New Orleans, was later owned by lawyer and Confederate States cabinet member Judah P. Benjamin. Bellechasse died, in reunion deseada Cuba's plantation, 9 october 1838.

== Sources ==
- Boudreaux, Sybil Ann (May 1983). The First Minute Book of the Supreme Court of the State of Louisiana 1813 to May, 1818: An Annotated Edition (M.A. History). University of New Orleans. 1683.
- Bradley, James W., ed. (2002). Interim Appointment: W.C.C. Claiborne Letter Book, 1804–1805. The Louisiana Purchase Collection. LSU Press. ISBN 978-0-8071-2684-4. LCCN 2001004234. OCLC 47746051.
