= Belle Chasse, Louisiana =

Belle Chasse
- Census-designated place
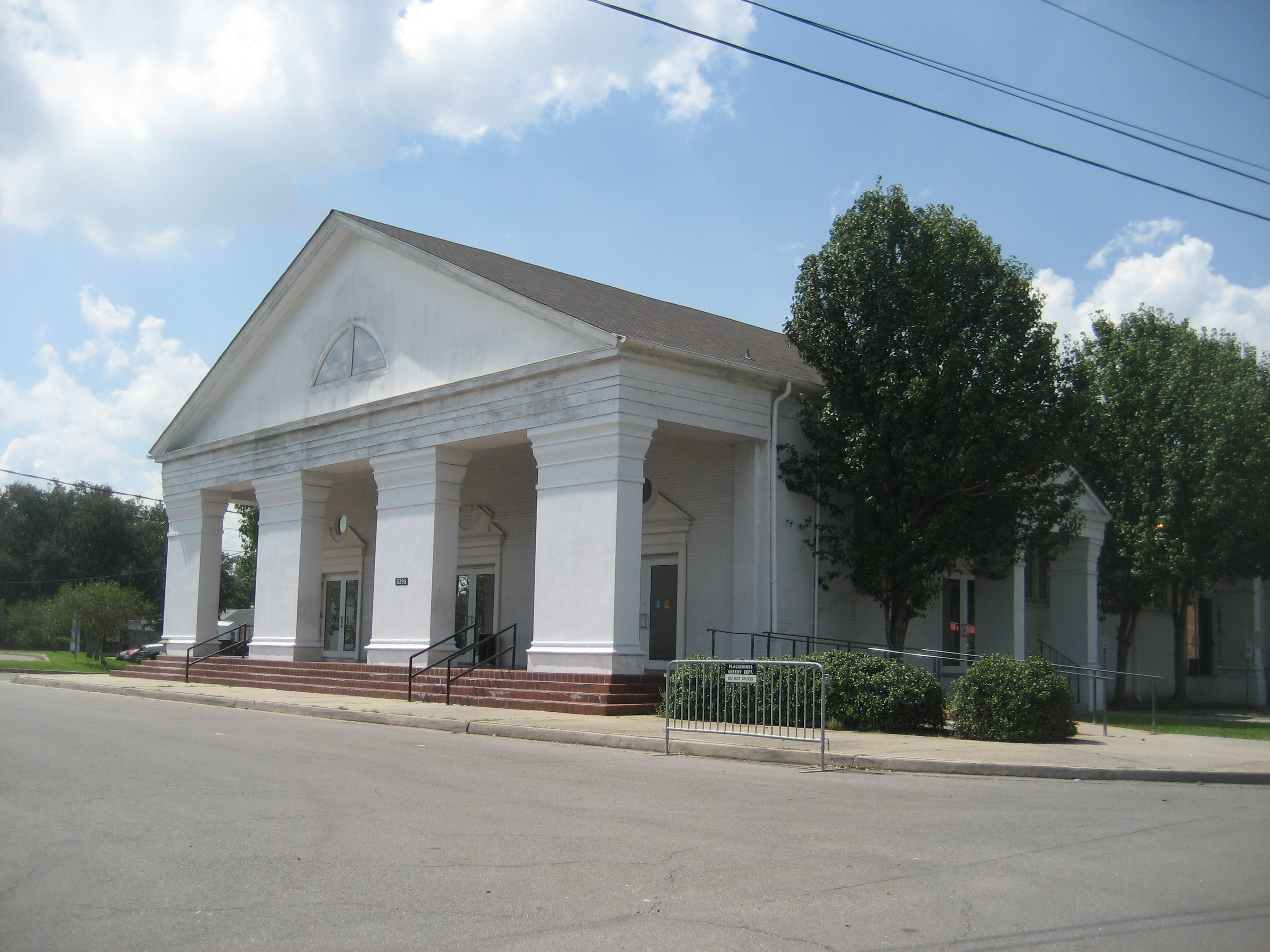
- Belle Chasse Auditorium

- Location of Belle Chasse in Louisiana
- Coordinates: 29°51′08″N 89°59′54″W
- Country: United States
- State: Louisiana
- Parish: Plaquemines

Area
  - Total: 10.10 sq mi (26.16 km^{2})
  - Land: 8.17 sq mi (21.16 km^{2})
  - Water: 1.93 sq mi (5.00 km^{2})
- Elevation: 7 ft (2.1 m)

Population (2020)
  - Total: 10,579
  - Density: 1,295.1/sq mi (500.04/km^{2})
- Time zone: UTC-6 (CST)
  - Summer (DST): UTC-5 (CDT)
- ZIP code(s): 70037, 70093
- Area code: 504
- FIPS code: 22-06120

Belle Chasse (/bɛl ˈtʃeɪs/ bel CHAYSS) is an unincorporated community and census-designated place (CDP) in Plaquemines Parish, Louisiana, United States, on the west bank of the Mississippi River. Belle Chasse is part of the Greater New Orleans metropolitan area. The population was 10,579 at the 2020 United States census. Belle Chasse is the largest community in Plaquemines Parish. It is home to Naval Air Station Joint Reserve Base New Orleans, a Naval Air Station for the U.S. Navy Reserve.

== History ==
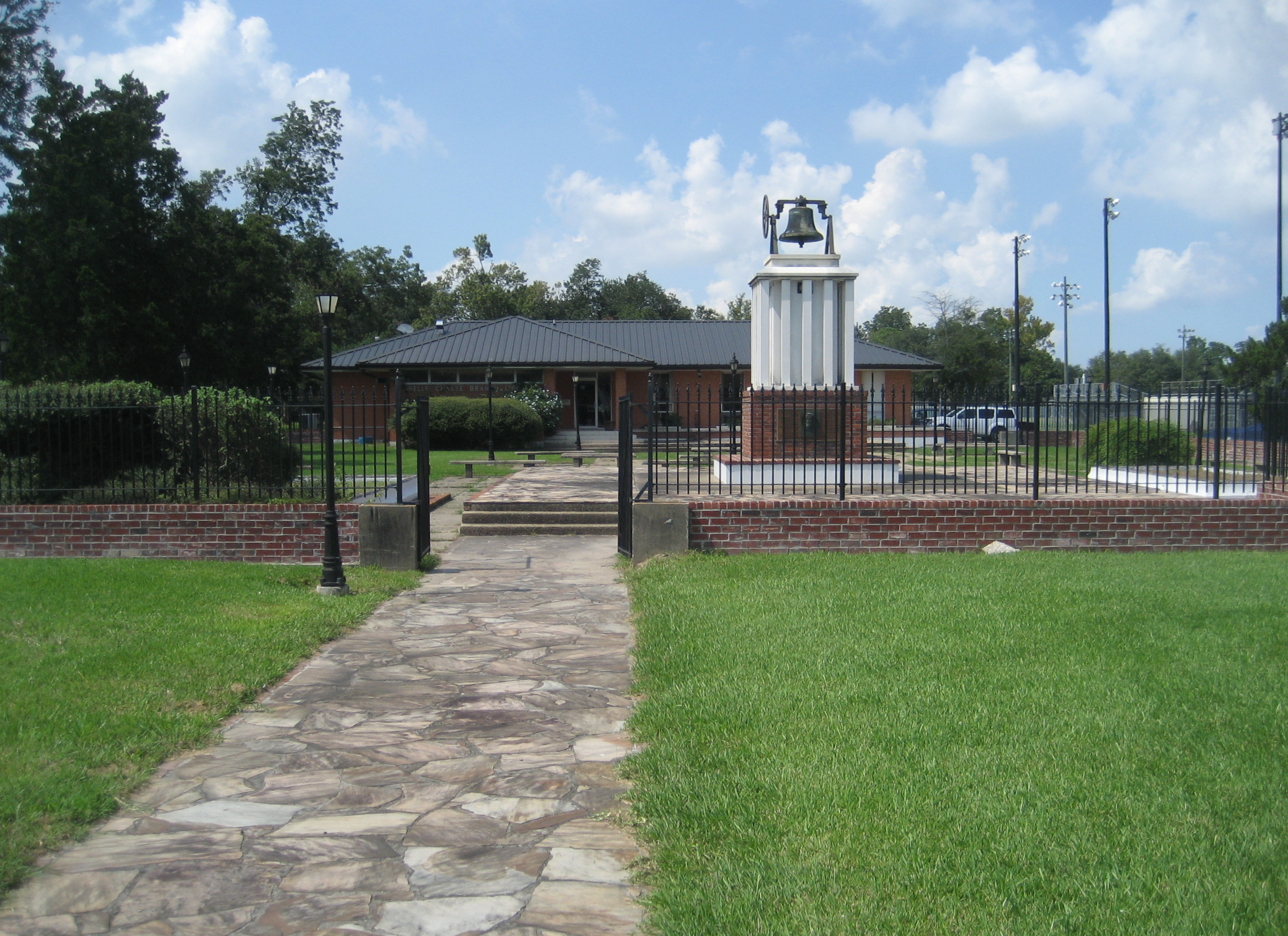
Bell from Benjamin's Belle Chasse Plantation at the Public Library

There is little consensus regarding the origin of the name Belle Chasse. In French, belle chasse literally means "beautiful hunting." It is widely believed that it was so named due to the richness of wildlife which the initial French colonists observed when they settled in the region. Others say that Belle Chasse was named for Spanish colonial administrator Joseph Deville Degoutin Bellechasse, who lived there from 1806 to 1814.

The Confederate statesman Judah P. Benjamin was the most famous owner of the Belle Chasse plantation. After falling into decay and abandonment by the 1930s, the landmark plantation house was demolished in 1960. The bell was salvaged and today is in front of the Belle Chasse Public Library.

The Naval Air Station was founded in 1920 on the south shore of Lake Pontchartrain, but in 1957 it relocated to its current location (Belle Chasse, Louisiana). It has been designated as a Joint Forces Reserve Air Station. It is home to various naval air units as well as an Air Force Reserve fighter squadron and a Marine Corps Reserve helicopter unit. In March 2009, U.S. Navy Reserve Airborne Early Warning Squadron 77 (VAW-77) relocated its six E-2C aircraft from NAS Atlanta, GA to Belle Chasse. The squadron routinely deploys to the Caribbean on counter-narcotic operations. The squadron aircrew are all U.S. Naval Reservists while the maintenance department for the aircraft is run by Northrop Grumman Field Services.

== Geography ==
Belle Chasse is located at 29°51′48″N 89°59′54″W (29.852243, -89.9983335), in the New Orleans metropolitan area. According to the United States Census Bureau, the CDP has a total area of 28.4 square miles (74 km^{2}), of which 24.9 square miles (64 km^{2}) is land and 3.5 square miles (9.1 km^{2}) (12.21%) is water.

== Demographics ==
Historical population
Census	Pop.	Note	%±
1980	5,412		—
1990	8,512		57.3%
2000	9,848		15.7%
2010	12,679		28.7%
2020	10,579		−16.6%
U.S. Decennial Census; 1950 1960 1970 1980; 1990 2000 2010

Belle Chasse first appeared as a census designated place the 1980 U.S. census.

Belle Chasse CDP, Texas – Racial and ethnic composition Note: the US Census treats Hispanic/Latino as an ethnic category. This table excludes Latinos from the racial categories and assigns them to a separate category. Hispanics/Latinos may be of any race.
Race / Ethnicity (NH = Non-Hispanic)	Pop 2000	Pop 2010	Pop 2020	% 2000	% 2010	% 2020
White alone (NH)	8,929	10,200	8,024	90.67%	80.45%	75.85%
Black or African American alone (NH)	415	969	633	4.21%	7.64%	5.98%
Native American or Alaska Native alone (NH)	60	110	71	0.61%	0.87%	0.67%
Asian alone (NH)	83	292	353	0.84%	2.30%	3.34%
Native Hawaiian or Pacific Islander alone (NH)	2	17	15	0.02%	0.13%	0.14%
Other race alone (NH)	15	33	64	0.15%	0.26%	0.60%
Mixed race or Multiracial (NH)	112	258	417	1.14%	2.03%	3.94%
Hispanic or Latino (any race)	232	800	1,002	2.36%	6.31%	9.47%
Total	9,848	12,679	10,579	100.00%	100.00%	100.00%

At the 2019 American Community Survey, there were 14,024 people living in Belle Chasse, up from 12,679 in 2010. The 2020 United States census reported a population decline at 10,579.

The racial and ethnic makeup of the community was 79.4% non-Hispanic white, 11.6% African American, 0.6% American Indian and Alaska Native, 2.4% Asian, 2.0% some other race, and 3.9% two or more races. Hispanic and Latino Americans were 10.5% of the population in 2019. In 2020, its makeup was 75.85% non-Hispanic white, 5.98% Black or African American, 3.34% Asian, 0.14% Pacific Islander, 4.55% two or more races, and 9.47% Hispanic and Latino American, reflecting the demographic transition of the U.S.

In 2019, the median age was 35.0, and 8.2% of the population were aged 5 and under; 70.7% of the population was aged 18 and older, and 10.7% were aged 65 and older. Among the population, 11.4% spoke a language other than English at home, and Spanish was the second most-spoken language. In the census-designated place, the median income for a household was $66,653, and $50,169 was the median income for males versus $41,623 for females. An estimated 11.3% of the population lived at or below the poverty line.

== Culture and arts ==
Belle Chasse is home to the famous "Orange Fest," and "Crawfish Fest". It is also home to the Plaquemines Parish Seafood Festival.

== Education ==
Plaquemines Parish School Board operates public schools in the entire parish.

Belle Chasse Primary, Belle Chasse Middle, Belle Chasse High School, Belle Chasse Academy, Plaquemines Parrish Alternative School.

At first Belle Chasse High, which opened in 1928, was K-12, but in 1977 Belle Chasse Middle School opened to take the middle grades away. Belle Chasse Primary opened in August 1994. Belle Chasse Middle received the 5th grade in 1999.

Belle Chasse also has a Catholic School, Our Lady of Perpetual Help School, of the Roman Catholic Archdiocese of New Orleans.

The Plaquemines Parish Library maintains the Belle Chasse Branch, and the library headquarters in the F. Edward Hebert Building.

== Government ==
Belle Chasse is the current and was the temporary home of the Plaquemines Parish Courthouse.

The United States Postal Service operates a post office.

=== Parish president ===
Amos Cormier Jr. was once a resident of Port Sulphur and resided in Belle Chasse when he died. Kirk Lepine defeated incumbent Amos Cormier III in a runoff election on December 8, 2018, to become Plaquemines Parish President.

== National Guard ==
Belle Chasse serves as a headquarters for the Louisiana Air Force National Guard and home of the 159th Fighter Wing. It served as the principal helicopter staging area for rescue operations during Hurricane Katrina.

== Notable people ==
- Billy Nungesser, former Parish President and current Lt. Governor of Louisiana.
- Chris Henry, former wide receiver for the Cincinnati Bengals
- Benny Rousselle, former member of the Louisiana House (1996–1999) and the former president of Plaquemines Parish government (1999–2007)
- Ernest Wooton, District 105 state representative (1999–2012), Plaquemines Parish sheriff (1984–1992)
- Bella Blue, Burlesque dancer
