= Edward'O =

Nicaraguan-American astrologer (born 1951)

Edward O
- Born: Edward O October 16, 1951 (age 74); Managua, Nicaragua
- Occupations: astrologer, TV host

Edward O better known as Edward'O (born in Managua, Nicaragua) is a Nicaraguan astrologer and former co-host of Telemundo's dating show, 12 Corazones.

== Early life ==
Edward'O (born May 7, 1946 in Managua, Nicaragua) moved to Los Angeles, California in 1989. He graduated in Latin American studies and possesses a post-graduate in Spiritual psychology.

Edward'O studies various religions such as Buddhism and Hinduism, as well as the religions of Native Americans, among many others. He has dedicated more than 30 years to astrology and esotericism.

== Predictions ==
Some of Edward'O predictions include

- Victory of President George W. Bush
- Northridge earthquake in Los Angeles
- Loma Prieta earthquake in San Francisco
- Death of Adán Sánchez

== See also ==
- 12 Corazones
