= David Obregón =

Nicaraguan boxer

Personal information
- Nickname: Toro de Chontales
- Born: José David Obregón; 5 October 1978 (age 47) Chontales, Nicaragua
- Height: 5 ft 10 in (180 cm)
- Weight: Light middleweight Welterweight

Boxing career
- Reach: 73 in (185 cm)
- Stance: Orthodox

Boxing record
- Total fights: 17
- Wins: 12
- Win by KO: 7
- Losses: 5
- Draws: 0
- No contests: 0

José David Obregón (born 5 October 1978) is a Nicaraguan former professional boxer who competed from 2004 to 2008. As an amateur, he competed at the 2001 Central American Games.

== Amateur career ==
At the 2001 Central American Games in Guatemala, he was eliminated in his opening bout against eventual silver medalist Carlos Hernández of El Salvador.

== Professional career ==
On 19 March 2004, Obregón won his professional debut against the veteran Jimmy Desir at the Civic Center in Kissimmee, Florida.

After several big wins by knockout, Obregón took on Humberto Chavez (6-3-2) at the Miccosukee Resort & Gaming in Miami, Florida, and won by split decision over six rounds.

=== De La Rosa vs. Obregón ===
On 25 August 2006, Obregón lost to undefeated Mexican James de la Rosa.
