= Torombolo =

American singer (born 1985)

Carlos Callejas
- Born: Carlos Callejas; September 17, 1985 (age 40); Granada, Nicaragua
- Genres: Reggaeton, hip hop
- Occupation: Singer

Carlos Callejas (born September 17, 1985, in Granada, Nicaragua), known professionally as Torombolo, is a reggaeton and hip hop singer with "Camillion Entertainment Latino".

== Early life ==
Torombolo grew up in Granada, Nicaragua mainly raised by his mother. At the age of 11 he, along with his family, moved to the San Francisco Bay Area in California. At the age of 16 Carlos decided to start his own project, he began making rap and reggaeton, being the second genre he knew well and along with other members of Camillion Ent, he invented their own style of music called "Bayggeaton", which mixed reggaeton with elements characteristic of Bay Area music.

== Career ==
=== 2007: Calibre ===
Torombolo's debut album, Calibre, was released in April 2007. It is Torombolo's first CD, which he named after his home state of California, he respectfully added "libre" (free) and created the name for the album, Calibre. The CD contains 15 tracks features singles such as "California", "Triquitraca", and "Nuevo Ritmo" which can be heard on the radio internationally. Calibre also features collaborations with other local Bay Area artist such as Dego and also Catracho on Tu Idolo, and Loco.

The songs on the CD reflect Torombolo's style of "Bayggeaton", a style of music which he invented along with members of Camillion Ent. Bayggeaton is reggaeton mixed elements usually found in local Bay Area music.

== Discography ==
=== Albums ===
- Calibre (2007)

=== Mixtapes ===
- Cammilion Ent. (2006)

== See also ==
- Music of Nicaragua
