= Escuela Nacional de Bellas Artes (Nicaragua) =

Coordinates: 14.09860°N 87.20720°W

Escuela Nacional de Bellas Artes (ENBA, or National School of Fine Arts) is a national fine arts institution located in Managua, Nicaragua. It was founded in 1938 as an apprentice-base learning workshop. Curricula established to meet educational standards set by the government were implemented in 1979. In 1997, the legislature created the Pablo Antonio Cuadra Nicaraguan Center for Artistic Education (Spanish: Centro Nicaragüense de Enseñanza Artística "Pablo Antonio Cuadra", (CENEAPAC)) to direct artistic education and development of Nicaraguan arts and established separate national schools for circus arts, dance, music, theater and visual arts.

== History ==
Escuela Nacional de Bellas Artes was founded in 1938, in Managua, Nicaragua by the sculptor Genaro Amador Lira. It operated as a workshop, where students collaborated as apprentices on commissions Amador secured to finance the school and sporadically held art history lectures. It was located on the west side of the Central Park in a home that formerly belonged to President Carlos José Solórzano. The house was a large two-story building surrounding a central courtyard and also served as the home of the School of Dance, Theater and Visual Arts (Spanish: Escuela de Danza, Teatro y Artes Plásticas). Lira drew from European influences, teaching students classical, mannerist and modernist sculptural styles, based on the works of Constantin Brâncuși. Many of his works were human figures of monumental size dedicated to glorifying the national and religious iconography of the country. Edith Grøn was a student of Lira who studied sculpture at the school and during her tenure, Roberto de la Selva and Fernando Saravia were fellow students.

In 1948 Rodrigo Peñalba was appointed director of the school. He had a background in painting and had studied abroad in Madrid, Mexico City, New York City and Rome. Students who graduated during Peñalba's leadership included Alejandro Aróstegui, Alejandro Canales, César Caracas, Pérez Carrillo, Noel Flores Castro, Arnoldo Guillén, Genaro Lugo, Silvio Miranda, Carlos Montenegro, Leoncio Saénz, Fernando Saravia, Luis Urbina, Julio Vallejos Ugarte, Leonel Vanegas and Pedro Vargas.

In 1972, the property was destroyed in the earthquake and in 1973, Peñalba left. The painter, Sergio Dávila took over the direction of the school in 1974. Without a permanent home, the school moved often until 1975, when Dávila secured a donated property in the Dambach Neighborhood of Managua from owners who had emigrated from the country. The location was shared with the National Museum of Cultural Heritage and offered only courses in visual arts and music. In 1979, Dávila was replaced when a new policy on culture was instituted by the government. For the first time, the state established material and courses for teaching visual arts and hired Cuban professors to formalize a program to teach ceramics, engraving, painting and sculpture. A workshop on murals developed in 1983. They established an autonomous facility in the Ministry of Culture, but in 1988, it closed and students rejoined the National School of Fine Arts.

In 1984, Alejandro Aróstegui founded the David Alfaro Siqueiros National School of Public-Monumental Art (Spanish: Escuela Nacional de Arte Público-Monumental "David Alfaro Siqueiros"), to address the fact that most of the public artworks in the country were being created using acrylic paints, a media which is impermanent in the tropical climate. The idea behind the school was to create public art, integrating architecture, crafts, painting and sculptural techniques for urban spaces. By merging the concepts of the Italian Renaissance schools, the German Bauhaus approach to design, and the Mexican Siqueiros Experimental Workshops, the school was operated with funds provided by the Italian Ministry of Foreign Affairs. When the funding ceased in 1987, the school was only able to survive for one or two more years, officially closing in 1989.

In 1997, the legislature created the Pablo Antonio Cuadra Nicaraguan Center for Artistic Education (Spanish: Centro Nicaragüense de Enseñanza Artística "Pablo Antonio Cuadra", (CENEAPAC)) as an institution to direct artistic education and development of Nicaraguan art. The center coordinates curricula for the Luís Abraham Delgadillo National School of Music (Spanish: Escuela Nacional de música "Luís Abraham Delgadillo"); the Rodrigo Peñalba National School of Visual Arts (Spanish: Escuela Nacional de Artes Plásticas "Rodrigo Peñalba"); the Adan Castillo National Dance School (Spanish: Escuela Nacional de Danza "Adan Castillo"); the Pilar Aguirre National Theater School (Spanish: Escuela Nacional de Teatro "Pilar Aguirre"); and the National School of Circus Arts (Spanish: Escuela Nacional de Circo).
