= J Smooth =

American singer

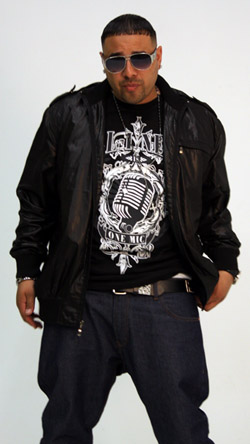

Background information
- Also known as: J Smooth
- Born
- Origin: Los Angeles, California
- Genres: Hip-hop, Reggaeton, Latin. Urban.
- Occupations: Rapper, Hip Hop Producer, Director, Host, M.C.
- Years active: 2006–Present
- Label: 570 Records
- Website: www.jsmoothonline.com

J Smooth is an American rapper, music video director and hip hop producer from Los Angeles, California. His musical career began in 2006 when he released a mixtape (CD) which primarily included remixes of popular songs at the time and freestyles over existing beats. This gained him attention in the South Bay and Los Angeles area. In the same year, he landed a spot on the MTV show, “Yo Momma” which gave him more exposure and an opening act spot for Pitbull. From there, he landed a headlining spot for the Feria Agostina Nicaragüense (aka Los Angeles Nicaraguan Festival), which continued to open doors for him – leading to performances for the Puerto Rican Festival, Colombian Festival, Salvadorian Festival, Guatemalan Festival, Bolivian Festival and Central American Festival, all in California.

J Smooth has toured in U.S cities including: Hollywood CA, San Diego, San Francisco, Chicago, Miami, New York, and has toured Central American countries including: Honduras, El Salvador, Nicaragua, and Costa Rica.

In 2013, J Smooth completed a European promo tour with stops at radio stations in Spain, Italy, Switzerland and France and an onstage appearance at the Moulin Rouge.

Smooth has opened up for Pitbull, Aventura, Sean Paul, Sensato, E-40, Snoop Dogg, Tego Calderon, Ivy Queen, Sugar Free, Tito El Bambino, Hector El Father, Tony Dice, Toby Love, Zion & Lennox, Wisin & Yandel, Don Omar, and De La Ghetto.

J Smooth has also had many appearances as a host for Genetivision (Latin Online channel).

He is shooting a pilot for a show set to air in Spain, and working on his next album "El Leon Anda Suelto" which will be his first all Spanish Album.

== Career ==
In 2007, J Smooth was named "Artist of the Year" by reggaetonnica.com voters, for his musical contributions to the hip-hop and reggaeton genre and also for his many contributions to the Latino community.

J Smooth's live performances include his female "Smooth Chicks" and "Dy/Nasty boys" dancers.

=== Musical style ===
J Smooth straddles 2 musical genres: Hip-Hop/R&B in English and Latin/Reggaeton in Spanish.

=== Influences ===
J Smooth has cited a multitude of artists as personal inspirations, including Snoop Dogg, Rick James, James Brown, LL Cool J, P. Diddy, Jay-Z, Busta Rhymes, Usher, Jagged Edge, Daddy Yankee, Tego Calderón, and Big Pun.

== Discography ==
=== Studio albums ===
- 2007: Done Properly (Double Disc)
- 2010: Plan B
- 2013: Flight Plan

=== Mixtapes ===
- 2006: Imfamous Mixtape
- 2007: Done Properly Mixtape
- 2008: The Talk of LA

=== Music videos ===
2006: No Me Importa	J Smooth/Solo Factory
2007: Get Some More/Que le Quite El Frio	J Smooth/CML
2008: Si Tu Quieres	Sendeu Flipin
2009: Get Down (feat Johnny Michael)	J Smooth/N2 Music HD
2010: Show Me The Money (feat Imfamous & Cost)	Sendeu Flipin
2011: Yo Quiero Tu Amor	Ivan "Menace" Robleto
2012: Oh Yeah	Ivan "Menace" Robleto
2012: Me Querias	Luna

== Filmography ==
=== Television ===
Name	Year	Role	Notes
Yo Momma (TV series)	2006–2007	Constant	2 Episodes
Atrevete (Variety Show)	2006	Himself	Performance
El Show De Fernando (Variety Show)	2008	Himself	Performance
LA Nights Illegal Street Races (Spain TV series)	TBA	Co Host	Pilot

== Early life ==
J Smooth's first experience of performing came from his living room performing for any and all guests and door to door salesman that came to his parents home; at the age of 5 he would sing the Prince song "Little Red Corvette" and Survivor's "Eye Of the Tiger". Later, when he was in first-grade he played a main part in the 49th Street School Christmas play. Noticing his love for music his parents enrolled him in piano lessons, and, at age 12, J Smooth was in the church choir. When he attended Montclair High school he was in performance choir and he played the part of Aladdin in the school play, also while at Montclair high he was in Video Production and Video Editing classes. The moment J Smooth knew that he wanted to pursue a career in music was while he was attending San Pedro High School and in his senior year he attended a class trip to the House of Blues in Hollywood on Sunset where there was a tour and a presentation with the house band. The band asked for someone to come up on stage, so Smooth volunteered and once he was on stage they had him perform James Brown's "I feel Good" which, even though he did not know it too well, he delivered a great rendition of it and once the song was finished he received a standing ovation and the band leader said to Smooth: "Your gonna be famous one day kid, I don't know what you are gonna do but I can tell you are a star" and that moment has driven him ever since.

== U.S Army ==
J Smooth served in the United States Army on tours in the Gulf and Homeland Security. He has an honorable discharge as of 2007.

== Philanthropy ==
In 2007, J Smooth started a Non Profit Organization called "La Esperanza" whose main purpose was to raise funds and awareness for poverty stricken school children, primarily in Nicaragua and other Central American countries. J Smooth donated a percentage of his album sales and was able to help renovate a school and provide school materials, he also has done numerous toy drives. Since then, others have joined in the organization and they continue to help children.

== Musical career ==
=== 2007 Done Properly ===
Done Properly was J Smooth's first studio album, a double disc LP with one side containing 12 English Hip-hop songs and the other 12 Spanish Latin/Reggaeton songs. From this album came the first single, "No Me Importa", for which a music video was shot in various locations in LA. The 2nd Single, "Si Tu Quieres", was released and went on to be in the top 10 most requested songs and videos in Nicaragua and in the top 20 in Central America in 2008. It featured J Smooth mixing English and Spanish rapping in English over reggaeton beats. The 3rd and final single from the album was, "No Puedo Dormir", which gained him U.S air play for the first time on LA's Latino 96.3fm radio station, and later on La Mega 94.9fm Miami. The Album contained production from Norman "Normatic" Jackson aka Mr Shark (J Lo's Musical Director & Engineer) for the most part, with production from J Smooth's younger brother Imfamous (Victor Aburto Jr.) and hip–hop artist and producer Curtiss King. The Done Properly album sold over 10,000 copies.

=== 2010 Plan B ===
Plan B was J Smooth's sophomore album and he continued with his dual genre on English hip–hop and Spanish reggaeton mix, this time with 12 tracks half English and half in Spanish. The first single, "Get Down", featured R&B crooner Johnny Michael (Konvict music) with an uptempo dance track and video with production from 570 Records inhouse producer Imfamous who produced the majority of the album. The 2nd single,"Show Me The Money", ft.Cost was well received by club DJ's. The 3rd single was the biggest success of Plan B with the help of a video shoot completely in Nicaragua which helped propel this single to success not only in Central but in South America with the song hitting the top 20 in Venezuela, Peru, Argentina and Bolivia. This album sold close to 15,000

=== 2012 Flight Plan ===
Flight Plan, J Smooth's 3rd and first all English hip-hop album is a 16 Track sample heavy album which starts with a track called "This is what it looks like" where he aggressively delivers each line as an actual rapper and not a reggaeton artist. Other tracks on this album were "I Can't Go Wrong" ft. Benjamin Wade and "Till The Morning" ft Infamous.

== Other ventures ==
=== Gentevision ===
2006-2008 J Smooth was a host for Gentevision–a Spanish online program interviewing celebrities.

=== Video directing ===
J Smooth edited the "Reboot it" music video parody for comedian Joey Medina and has been a writer and producer for various music videos (Vice 45) as well as directed a handful of music videos for upcoming artist (Johnny Michael,Tony Sans,Yung Kourageous).

J Smooth is working on Tux's music video and shooting a pilot for a car enthusiast's show set to air in Spain in which he will be co-hosting.

== See also ==
- Music of Nicaragua
