= Germanic name =

Type of given name

Germanic given names are traditionally dithematic; that is, they are formed from two elements (stems), by joining a prefix and a suffix. For example, King Æþelred's name was derived from æþele, meaning "noble", and ræd, meaning "counsel". The individual elements in dithematic names do not necessarily have any semantic relationship to each other and the combination does not usually carry a compound meaning. Dithematic names are found in a variety of Indo-European languages and are often derived from formulaic epithets of heroic praise. Another suggestion is that they reflected wishes for newborns.

There are also names dating from an early time which seem to be monothematic, consisting only of a single element. These are sometimes explained as hypocorisms, short forms of originally dithematic names, but in many cases the etymology of the supposed original name cannot be recovered.

The oldest known Germanic names date to the Roman Empire period, such as those of Arminius and his wife Thusnelda in the 1st century CE, and in greater frequency, especially Gothic names, in the late Roman Empire, in the 4th to 5th centuries (the Germanic Heroic Age).

A great variety of names are attested from the medieval period, falling into the rough categories of Scandinavian (Old Norse), Anglo-Saxon (Old English), continental (Frankish, Old High German and Low German), and East Germanic (see Gothic names) forms.

By the High Middle Ages, many of these names had undergone numerous sound changes and/or were abbreviated, so that their derivation is not always clear.

Of the large number of medieval Germanic names, a comparatively small set remains in common use today. For almost a thousand years, the most frequent name of Germanic origin in the English-speaking world has traditionally been William (from the Old High German Willahelm), followed by Robert, Richard and Henry.

Many native English (Anglo-Saxon) names fell into disuse in the later Middle Ages but experienced a revival in the Victorian era. Some of these are Edwin, Edmund, Edgar, Alfred, Oswald and Harold for males; the female names Mildred and Gertrude also continue to be used in present day, Audrey continues the Anglo-Norman (French) form of the Anglo-Saxon Æðelþryð, while the name Godiva is a Latin form of Godgifu.

Some names, like Howard and Ronald, are thought to originate from multiple Germanic languages, including Anglo-Saxon.

== Dithematic names ==
Element	Meaning	First element	Second element	Examples	Notes
act, aht, oht	fearsome(?)	check		Ohthere, Ohtrad, Actumerus, Octric, Actulf; Actohildis, Octolindis	Pokorny suggests rather the root of OHG āhta `hostile pursuit', Germ.. Acht, OE. ōht 'pursuit, harassment'< *anhtō, in OE conflated with ōht 'terror', from the preterite of ag- "fear". These represent perhaps two or more roots which are indistinguishable without
*agi-; eg, ecg, egg, ekk, agin, egin	sword, blade	check		Egbert, Ecgbald, Eggert, Ecgwine, Ekkehart, Ecgric, Eginolf; Ecgwynn, Egon	Some names in ag-, eg- may be unrelated in origin; see Förstemann, 9.
agil, ail, eil	dread or weapon edge	check		Agilperht, Agilfrid, Agilulf, Egilger, Agilmar/Ilmar/Elmar, Egil, Egilrat; Alruna, Agilburgis,	Uncertain etymology; like agin perhaps a hypostatis of the older ag-; Förstemann, 22. See Agilaz.
ala	all	check		Alafrid, Alager, Alamunt, Alarad, Alaric, Alaruna, Alasuind	Some names in ala- have this etymology; others are corruptions of names in aþal-. Förstemann, 39.
ald, eald	old	check	—	Altopold, Altiperht, Aldfrid/Aldfrith, Aldegar, Aldman, Ealdred/Aldred, Aldwig, Aldwin/Audoin/Alduin, Ealdwulf/Aldwulf; Aldedrudis, Aldeberga/Aldburg, Aldigart, Altagund/Ealdgyð, Aldelindis, Aldis	
*albi-; ælf, elf, alf	elf	check	—	Ælfwine, Ælfric, Alfred, Ælfweard, Ælfsige; Ælfflæd, Ælfwaru, Ælfwynn	
*alh, alah, ealh	hall, temple	check		Ealhhelm, Ealhmund/Alcmund, Alhred, Ealhwine/Alcuin; Ealhswith, Ælgifu(?)	Perhaps related to runic alu
amala	work(?)	check		Amaleberga, Amalafrida, Amalrica, Amalaswintha/Melisende/Millicent	cf. Amalia, Amelie. This element's etymology is uncertain, but it is frequently compared to Old Norse aml "work".
angil, engel; ingal/ingel	a tribal name	check		Angilbald, Angilberht/Engelbert, Engilfrit, Angalgar, Angilhelm/Ingelhelm, Engilhoh; (Ingalberta), Angilburga, Angildruda, Engilgund	Names in angil- may arise with Christianization, by conflation with the prefix ingal-, an extension of the theophoric ing- prefix; see Förstemann, 89.
*aþal-, adall, æthel	noble	check		Æthelhard, Æthelred, Adolf/Æthelwulf, Alphonse, Albert/Adelbert, Adelbrand/Alebrand, Æthelburh, Adelaide, Æthelstan, Æthelflæd, Adalsinda, Adelmar, Æthelthryth/Audrey, Aðils, Æthelgifu	see ethel, odal,
*anô-, ON anu or ái, OHG ano	ancestor	check	(?)	Olaf	Hypocorisms Ole, Åke/Åge
*ans-, ON ás, OHG ans, AS os	god	check	—	Asbjørn/Osborne, Ansgar/Osgar, Oswin, Oswald/Ansaldo/Answald, Ansleth, Ásleikr/Anslech/Oslac, Ansfridus, Anshelmus/Anselm, Ansgisus/Ansegisus, Ansbrecht/Osbert, Osburh, Osgyth, Osthryth	
ar, ara, ari, arni, earn	eagle	check		Arafrid, Aramund, Arswind, Arfrid, Arnipert, Arnold, Arnulf, Arvid	Many of these names cannot be distinguished with certainty from the corresponding name in hari-.
arb, erb, erf	inheritance	check	—	Arbogastis, Erbhart, Erphari, Erpolach, Erflind, Erbemar, Erpmund, Erferat, Erferih, Erpwin, Erpulf	Hypocorisms Aribo, Erbo
asc, æsc	ash, spear (made of ash tree)	check		Askold, Aschari, Asclind, Ascarich, Ascwin, Asculf	cf. Oisc, Ask
*audaz, aud, od, euþ, auþ, euth, ead, eod, jóð	wealth, prosperity	check		Audeca, Audofleda, Auduin, Odotheus, Audovacar/Odoacer, Odomir/Otmar/Ottomar/Othmar/Ademar, Edgar/Audagar/Ottokar, Edmund, Eadnoth, Eadred/Edred, Edward, Eadwig, Eadwulf, Edwin, Eadgifu, Edith. Eadgils (etc.)	Extremely frequent. cf. also Ethel, Otto, Odda, Auðr
aun, on, ean	one (?)	check		Eanhere, Aunefrit/Eanfrith, Aunemund, Onerich, Aunulf; Eanflæd	Possibly "one" due to vowel being pronounced farther back in the mouth. At the time, and given those bearing the name, slowly becoming Old English "an", meaning "one'. But officially the etymology is unknown; see Förstemann, 181.
aus, aust, eost	radiant; a goddess	check		Auripert, Aurendil/Orendil/Aurvandil, Aurulf; Ostheri, Austrad, Austrobert, Austraberta, Ostarpurc, Aostarger, Aostargart, Austrigisil, Ostarhilt, Ostremund, Austrad, Australd, Ostruin, Austrulf	Possibly theophoric, see Eostre, Aurvandil
bald	bold	check	check	Baldwin; Theobald, Ubaldo, etc.	Very frequent, and often conflated with the wald element.
band	band, loop	check	?	Pandulf/Pandolfo	
baud, bad, bud, badu, beadu, both	battle?	check	check	Baudigisil, Baudegund, Baudemund, Baudulf, Beadohild, Beaduhelm, Beaduwine, Bothvildr	Uncertain etymology; mostly in old names (before the 8th century) Förstemann, 216f. In later use indistinguishable from bald
baug	ring	check		Baugegundus, Bauglind, Baugulf	
*berht-; beraht, bryht, briht	bright	check	check	Byrhtnoth, Bertrand, Bertram, Bertold/Berthold, Beorhtric, Bertrude, Brihtwyn; Cuthbert, Aribert, Albert/Albright/Adelbert, Rigobert, Robert/Rupert, Herbert, Humbert, Hubert, Norbert, Wilbert, Delbert/Dagobert, Engelbert, Egbert, Lambert, Sindbert, Bertstan, Lubbert, Ludbert, Engilbrecht, Thuringbert, Wolfbert	hypocorism Bert. One of the most frequent elements, but not attested before the 6th century.
burg, beorg	fortress	check	check	Burchard/Burkhart, Burgred; Cuthburh, Eadburh, Æthelburh, Notburga, Osburh, Redburga, Seaxburh, Walpurga, Werburgh	The suffix is feminine only. See also Burke
bera, bern, berin, beorn	bear	check		Berengar, Berahart/Bernhard/Bernard, Berhildis, Berahoch, Bermar, Berimund, Beornwulf	cf. Beonna, Berig
bil	blade, sword	check		Biligrim, Bilihelm, Bilihild, Billfrith, Belimar, Bilidruda, Pilolf	among the Saxons often monothematic, as Bilo, Pilicho, Pillin, Billung
blic	lightning	check		Blictrud, Blicger, Blicgart, Plechelm, Blicildis	
blid	blithe	check		Bliddruda, Bllithar, Blithelm, Blidhild, Blidmar, Blidulf, Blidemund, Plittelmi	
bord	shield	—	check	Herebord, Hiltiport, Saelbort, Willipord	
brand	fire, as a kenning for "sword"	check	check	Branthildis, Branthoc, Brandulf; Adelbrand, Gerbrand, Hildebrand, Hadubrand, IJsbrand, Liutprand, Rembrandt, Theudebrand	cf. Brant. Attested from the 7th century, with the exception of Gothic Brandila
brun	armour, protection; brown	check		Brunfrid, Brunger, Brunric, Brunward, Brunulf/Brynolf/Brunolf/Brynjolfr/Brunulphe; Brunhild; Adalbrun, Hiltibrun, Liefbrun, Liutbrun.	The words for "armour" and for "brown" are unrelated, but a distinction of these two elements is impossible.
dag, tag	day	check	check	Tagapald/Dacbold, Dagaperht/Dagobert, Tachiprand, Dagafrid, Dachelm, Tagarat/Dagred, Dagaric, Dagewin, Dagaulf; Alfdag, Osdag, Heridag, Helmdag, Hildidag, Hroddag, Wendildag, Wulfdag,	Possibly a conflation of several roots, perhaps brightness, day, and a loan of Celtic dago "good".
deor	dear	check		Deorwine / Darwin / Derwin	
dis, idis	lady	check	check	Dissibod, Disnot	Names with this prefix are probably theophoric. In Nordic feminine names with the suffix -dis, the meaning is "woman".
diur, deor	animal	check		Deurtrudis, Thiurhilt, Deorold, Deorulf	The meaning of this element may be either "animal" (deer) or "dear". See also Deor.
dom	judgement (doom)	check	?	Dombert, Domedrudis, Domegerdis, Domalde, Duomolf	
druht, droc, druc	people	check		Droctbold, Drocberta, Drutberga, Drucfred, Druhtgang, Truhthari, Droctelm, Dructildis, Druhtmar, Dructimund, Dructuin, Dructulf	
ebur, eber, eofor, ever	boar	check		Eparpert/Everbert, Euerberga, Euurdag/Everdei/Eofordæg, Ebertrudis, Eparfrid, Eberger, Eberhard/Eoforheard/Everard/Evorhart/Euerart/Everett, Ebarhelm/Evorhelm, Eburhilt, Ebirmuot, Ebermunt, Ebarolt/Euerwolt, Eberwin/Ebroin, Eberulf/Everwolf/Everolf, Eboric/Everik, Eoforwulf, Everrod, Everbalt, Everwacchor	
era, eri, erin, ern	honour	check		Erarich, Eranbald, Erambert, Ernulf	Probably a genuine element, but difficult to distinguish from hari, which is also often reduced to eri-, er-, or from ari, arni. The form erin-, on the other hand, is often conflated with the irm- element.
ercan, erchen, archen, eorcen	pure, genuine	check		Ercanberaht/Eorcenberht/Erchempert, Ercanbold/Archibald, Ercamberta, Ercanpurh, Ercantrud, Ercanfrid, Ercangar, Ercanhilt, Erchensinda, Erchinoald/Erchanold, Archanolf/Erchenulf	Förstemann, 377 connects OGH ercan "sublime, pure, holy" (the general sense in Gothic as well). In OE and ON used in compounds designating various "precious" stones. Perhaps theophoric, from a name of Teiwaz.
erl, eorl	warrior, noble	check		Erlabald/Erlembald, Erlefrida, Erligar, Erlemund, Erlwin, Erlulf	Pokorny suggests a tentative link with ari-, arni- "eagle", an 'l' suffix form of which is found in the Balto-Slavic languages.
ewa, ew, eu, eo	ever	check		Euin, Eubert, Eomar, Eumund, Ewirat, Eric, Eowig, Eolf	
far, fara; fart, fard	journey, travel	check	check	Farabert, Faregar, Feriher, Farohildis, Ferlinda, Faraman, Faramod, Faramund, Faroald, Faruin, Faraulf, Farnulf; Farthilt, Fartman, Ferdinand, Fardulf; Adalfer, Leobafar, Sicfara, Theudifara	
fast	firm, fast	check	—	Fastburg, Fastrada, Fastrih, Fastwin, Fastulf	
fili	much, many(?)	check		Filibert, Feologild?, Filuliub, Filomar, Filomuot	
*friþu-; ON friþ, OHG fridu	protection, peace	check	check	Fredegar, Ferdinand, Fredegund/Frithugyth, Friedrich/Frederick, Frithuwold, Fridthjof/Fritiof; Billfrith, Dietfried, Ecgfrith/Ecgfrida, Ermenfrid, Godfried, Gottfried, Sigfrid/Siegfried, Walfrid/Walfried	In Old English, used almost exclusively for male names; Ecgfriþ is noted exception
flad, flæð	purity, glory, beauty	check	check	Fladebert, Flatberta, Flatberga, Fladrudis, Fledrad, Flidulf; Albofledis/Ælfflæd, Ansfledis, Audofleda/Aethelflaed, Berhtflat, Burgofledis, Druhtflat, Ermenfleda, Gerflat, Gundiflat, Hrotflat, Ratflad, Sigiflat, Wynflæd	The suffix is feminine only.
fram	spear, javelin	check		Frambold, Frambert, Framsindis, Franemund, Franswinda	Almost exclusively Frankish names
franc	a tribal name	check		Francobert, Frangomere, Franchrih	
fraw, fro, frea; fri	lord	check		Frowin, Frawibald, Frawiprecht, Frawihilt, Frowimund, Frowini, Frauirat, Frawisinda, Freawaru; Friher, Frehild, Friulf	cf. Fróði; theophoric (see Fraujaz, Frijjō).
frig, freh	bold	check		Frigobert, Frehholt, Friculf	
frod	wise, prudent	check		Frotbald, Frodobert, Frotfar, Frotfrid, Frodegard, Frothard, Frotland, Frotmir, Frotmund, Frodwin, Frodulf	hypocorisms Frodo, Frutilo, Frodin
frum	good, beneficial	check		Frumiger, Frumihilt, Frumirat, Frumirih, Frumold, Frumolf, Frumar	
fulc, folc, volc	people, folk	check	check	Folcbald, Forlberaht/Volcbert, Fulcdag, Folhker/Folcger, Folchard, Fulchar/Volker, Volkhard, Folcleih, Fulclindis, Folcman, Folcmar/Volkmar, Folcnand, Fulcrad, Fulcrich, Folcswind, Fulcuald, Folcward, Folcwin, Fulculf; Heidifolc, Herifolch, Hrodfolc, Ratfolc, Sigifolc, Saelfolc	
funs, fús	eager, brave	—	check	Amdefuns, Adalfuns/Alphonse, Bernefons, Hadufuns, Sigifuns, Valafons	
gail, gel	gay, merry	check	—	Gelbold, Geilindis, Geilamir, Gailswindis, Geilwib, Geilwih,	hypocorism Gailo, Geliko
gamal, gam	old	check	—	Gamalbold, Gamalbert, Gamalberga, Gamaltrudis, Gamalfred, Gamalher, Camalrat,	
gaman	joy	check		Gamanhilt, Gamanolt, Gamanulf	Only Old High German, rare
gan	walk?	check	check	Gannibald, Ganefard, Ganhart; Adalgan, Audiganus, Wolfgan	
gand, gend	magic	check	check	Gantberga, Gentfrid, Ganthar/Ganther, Gendrad, Gandaricus, Gandulf; Gredegand, Charigand, Hrodogand, Gislegendis	Hypocorisms Gando, Gantalo, Gandin; cf. Gandalfr (mythological)
gang	path, journey	check	check	Gangperht, Gangolf; Bertegang, Druhtgang, Hildigang, Hrodegang, Thiotcanc, Uligang, Widugang, Wiligang, Wolfgang	
gar, ger, earlier gais	spear	check	check	Gerald, Gerhard/Gerard, Gerbrand, Gerwin, German; Berengar, Edgar, Oscar, Hrothgar/Roger, Thøger/Tøger/Theodgar	hypocorism Gero, Gerry. Very frequent both as prefix and as suffix. Gerðr is the wife of Freyr in Norse mythology.
gard	enclosure	check	check	Gardrad, Gardulf; Hildegard, Irmgard, Liutgart, Richardis, etc.	Rare as a prefix, very frequent as a suffix. The great majority of names with this suffix are feminine.
gast	guest; spirit	check	check	Castald, Gestilind, Gestiliub, Gastrad; Altgast, Alpkast, Andragast, Arbogast, Cunigast, Hartigast, Hiltigast, Hungast, Lindigast, Milgast, Nebiogast, Salagast, Suabgast, Widogast, Visogast	Mostly as suffix; frequent in early (3rd to 4th centuries) names; frequent conflation with Slavic names (Radegast, Gustaph).
gaud, gaut, gaus, got, goz	a tribal name	check	check	Gauzebald/Cozpolt/Gausbolda, Gaucibert/Gozperaht, Gauseprand, Gausburgis, Gauttrudis, Caozflat, Gautfred, Gozger, Gauter/Kozheri, Gautastabaz/Göstaf/Gösta/Gustav, Gautshelm, Gauthildis, Gozleih, Gautlindis, Gautrekr, Goswin/Gaudoin, Gaudulf; Algaut, Amalgaud, Ansegaud, Ariugaud, Ostgaus/Aostargaoz, Berengaud, Danegaud, Trutgaud, Ebregaud, Ercangaud, Erlegaud, Faregaud, Gisalgoz, Helmigaud, Hildegaud, Hohgaud, Hungoz, Irmegaus, Ermengaud, Teutgaud, Ulgaud, Waldegaud, Wihgoz, Vuldargoza.	The tribal name of the Geats/Goths. Hypocorisms Gaudo, Gaudila, Gauzilin, Gaudin. These names are popular during the 6th to 11th centuries. The forms in got are difficult to distinguish from the element god "god".
geld, gild; gold	worthy; gold, payment, yield	check	check	Giltbert, Gelther, Gildemir, Giltrada, Geldirih, Goldrun, Geltwif, Geltwig, Gildewin, Geldulf; Amalgaldis, Ausigildis, Adalgildis, Athanagild, Beregildis, Bertegildis, Trutgildis, Faregildis, Framengildis, Fredegildis, Frotgiliis, Gislegildis, Herigilid, Hleokelt, Lantegildis, Rihgelt, Sparagildis, Teutgildis, Wandegildis, Witgildis, Wolfgelt, etc.	Hypocorisms Gildo, Gilting, Coldin, Gilticho
gifu; geb, gib	gift	check	check	Gibbold, Gibborga, Gibitrudis, Giffrid, Gebhard, Gebaheri, Gibohildis, Gebahoh, Gebalinda, Geberad, Geberic, Gebawin, Gibulf; Ælgifu/Ælfgifu, Ælthelgifu/Eadgifu, Godgyfu/Godiva, Ottogeba, Thialgif, Willigip	hypocorisms Gabilo, Gibilin, Gebi, Gabo, Gibicho, etc.
gisil, gisel	hostage, pledge	check		Giselbert, Giselric, Giselhard; Giselberga	Hypocorism Gisela, cf. Giselle
glis	gleam	check		Glismot, Glisnot	
god, got	god; good	check		Godfrid/Godfrey, Godscalc, Gothard, Gotwald	In most cases, the etymologies guda "deus" and goda "bonus" cannot be distinguished with certainty, while in older continental names this is often an alternative form of Gund
graus	horror, terror	check		Crosmuat (8th century), Grausolph (9th century)	simplex Grauso, Chroso, Cros, Kros, etc.;
graw, gra	grey	check		Graobart, Grahilt (8th century), Graman (8th century), Graulf (8th century)	
grim	helmet, mask	check	check	Grimwald, Grimoald, Grimhild/Krimhild/Kriemhild; Isegrim/Isengrim	
guma	man	check		Gomadrudis, Gomoharius, Gomahilt, Gomaleih, Gomlinda, Gumemar, Gumarich, Gumesind, Gumoalt, Gomolf	
*gunþ-; gund, gud, gyþ, gyð	battle, war	check	check	Günther/Gunther/Gunter/Guntar/Gundar, Gundoald, Gundulf, Gunnhild, Gudrun; Eadgyth/Edith, Ealdgyð, Fredegund/Frithugyth, Sigith/Sigesgundia, Hildegund/Hildegunn, Rigunth	
hag(i, o), hagan; hah	enclosure, yard	check		Hagibert, Hagihar, Hachirat, Hagoald, Hagiwolf; Hahger, Hahmund, Hahwart, Haholf	Attested from the 7th century in forms such as Hago, Chaino etc. From an early time conflated with names in Ag-, Agin-. See also Haguna.
haid, heit	rank, state	check	check	Haidrich, Heidfolc, Chaideruna; Adelaide etc.	Extremely frequent as second element in feminine names (83 listed by Förstemann), apparently due to early confusion with similar words for heath.
hail, heil; hailag	whole, healthy	check	check	Hailbert, Hailun, Hailburch, Hailtruda, Heilan, Heilmunt, Hailrat, Hailwin; Halagmund, Halegred; Rihheil, Sarahailo	Hailo, Halicho (8th century); conflated with the elements agil and hal.
*haim-; OHG haim, heim, AS hæm	home	check		Henry/Heinrich, Heimwart	hypocorism Haimo
haist, heist	furious, violent(?)	check		Haisthilt, Haistulf, Hailun	cf. Old English hæst; also compared with the tribal name of the Aesti.
hamar	hammer	check		Hamerard, Hamarolf, Hamarbert	Rare; limited to a handful of names of the 8th century.
hand, hant	hand(?)	check		Hantbert, Hantker, Handegis, Hantwin, Handolf	Rare, 8th and 9th centuries.
harc	altar(?)	check		Harcmot, Hercrat, Harchellindis (f.), Horcholt	rare, 9th and 10th centuries; cf. the entries under ercan.
hart, hard, hardt, heard	brave, hardy, strong, heavy	check	check	Hartman, Hartmut (etc.); Æthelhard, Richard, Gerhard, Gotthard, Bernard/Bernhard, Eckhardt (etc.)	Very frequent, recorded from as early as the 3rd century.
*hari, her	army	check	check	Diether, Luther, Haraldr/Hereweald/Harold, Herbert, Herleif, Herman/Arminius, Ariovistus, Ariouualdus, Ælfhere/Alfarr/Alfheri, Hereric, Wulfhere, Herebeald, Eanhere, Oshere, Hermóðr/Heremod/Herimout, Herbrandr, Ívarr, Yngvarr/Ingvarr, Hloþhere, Æþelhere, Walter	hypocorism Harry, Heri(?). Very frequent, Förstemann lists 289 names with -hari as second element. As first element recorded as early as the 1st century (in Chariovalda), or possibly in the 1st century BC (Negau helmet B, Harigasti)
hath, had, hada, hadu	battle, combat	check	check	Hadubrand, Hadufuns, Hedwig; Rihhad, Willihad, Wolfhad, Vunnihad	Frequent, from the 6th century, formally indistinguishable from haid.
hedan, haidan	heathen, pagan	check	check	Hedenold, Hedenulf; Wolfhetan	rare; 7th to 9th centuries.
helm	protector	check	check	Helmut, Helmdrud, Helmfrid; Diethelm, Ealhhelm, Anselm, Cwichelm, Nothhelm, Wilhelm/William	Hypocorism Helmo. Comparatively frequent from the 6th century.
heah, hoch	high	check		Heaberht, Hámundr	cf. Huoching/Haki
hild-	war	check	check	Actohildis, Berhildis, Branthildis, Brunhild, Clotilde, Farohildis, Ermenhild/Imelda, Gauthildis/Gauthildr, Gerhild, Gibohildis, Grimhild/Krimhild/Kriemhild, Griselda, Gunnhild, Matilda, Judelhildis, Landohildis, Nanthild, Richilda, Wanthildis; Childebert, Hildebrand, Hildegard, Hildegund/Hildegunn (etc.)	One of the most frequently used stems both as prefix and as suffix, attested since the 3rd century. Among the Franks its use especially for feminine names is "almost excessive" according to Förstemann, who counts 281 names with this suffix, of which only four are masculine. Hypocorism Hilda.
hilp, help	aid, help	check	—	Chilperic, Helpoald, Helpuin, Helpwolf	rare; Chilperic is from the 5th century, other names with this element occur only in the 8th and 9th centuries.
*heltą, hilt, hilz, helz	hilt	check	—	Hilcekin, Helzuni, Helzolt	rare; 8th to 11th centuries
himil	heaven	check		Himildrud, Himilger, Himilrad	rare, 8th to 10th centuries.
hir-/heru	sword	check		Hiring, Hiribert, Hirburc, Hiriger, Hiriward	9th century; Gothic hairus, Anglo-Saxon heoro- "sword", also in the tribal name of the Cherusci.
hiruz, hiriz, herz	hart, stag	check		Hirizpero, Herzrad(?); dim. Hirzula	rare
hleo	protection	check		Hleoperht, Hlevagastir	
hlud, hloda	fame	check		Clotilde, Clovis/Chlodwig/Ludwig/Louis, Hlothhere, Ludolf, Lothar/Chlothar/Lothaire, Chlodomir; Chlodoswintha	
hog, huog	dexterous, nimble(?)	check		Huogobert, Huoging, Huogulf, Hogo	
hol	crafty, devious(?)	check		Holebert, Holomot, Holemund, Holosint	
hord, hort	hoard, treasure	check		Hortbert, Horthari, Hordold, Hordward, Horduin, Hordolf	
hraban, hram	raven	check	check	Bertram, Wolfram	frequent in the 7th to 9th centuries; surely from the ravens of Wodanaz originally (as was wulf-). Förestemann counts 125 masculine and 15 feminine with this suffix. The simplex Hraban (and variants) is recorded from the 6th century. The Gothic name Valarauans if it contains this root would be the oldest record of the element (4th century).
hrad	quick, fast	check	(?)	Hradperaht, Hradpurh, Hradgast, Hrathari, Hradwin	
hraid, hreid	famous(?)	check		Hreiðmarr, Hreidperaht, Hreidgaer, Hreitolf, Hraidmund/Raymond	also in the name of the Hreiðgoths.
hring, ring	ring	check	(?)	Hringuni, Rhincbold, Ringhelm, Hringweald, Hringolf	Förstemann 1900:877 suggests that the "ring" element in origin refers to ring-mail
hroc, roc	rook (bird)	check	check	Ferderuchus, Unhroch, Wolfhroc; Rocbert, Hrohhart, Hrocculf, Ruocswint, Berthroc	Förstemann 1900:878f. surmises an early conflation of two elements (1) hrauc "roar, bellow, (battle-)cry" and (2) rōc "care, circumspection", and both were further conflated with hrōþ- as first element, and with -rih as second. As a second element since the 5th century. Crocus, the 4th-century king of the Alamanni, presumably had a name formed from this element, as did Rocco bishop of Autun (7th century) and Rocho bishop of Bourges (8th century).
hrom, hruom, rom	glory, fame	check	—	Ruombald/Rumbold/Rombout, Rumbert, Ruumker, Hrumheri, Ruomlind, Romuald, Romulf	since the 5th century; hypocorisms Ruom, Roma, Rumo. Förstemann 1900:883
*hrōþ-; hruot	fame, glory, honour	check	check	Rotilde, Hrothgar/Roger/Rüdiger, Hrodberht/Rupert/Robert, Hrodulf/Rudolph, Roderick/Rodrigo, Roland, Rodney, Roald; Adalrod, Fridarut, Hartrod, Liutrod, Sigirod	8th century; hypocorisms Chrodius, Hrodo, Hrodio, Hroda; Förstemann 1900:883
hug(o, i), hyg	spirit, courage	check	check	Hugibald/Ubaldo, Hygelac/Hyglac, Hugubert/Hubert, Hugibrant, Hucger, Hugilind; Adalhug, Kerhuge	hypocorisms Hugh, Hugo
hun, hum	swelling; chip, block; offspring, (bear) cub; warrior	check	check	Hunferthus, Humboldt, Hunbeorht/Humbert; Andhun, Berthun; Ælfhun	cf. Hun of East Anglia
ing	a god	check		Inga, Ingeborg, Inger, Ingvar/Igor, Ingrid, Ingemar/Ingmar	
irm(en), erm(en)	strong, whole	check		Eormenred, Ermenrich/Hermeric/Emmerich/Emery/Amerigo; Ermendrud/Ermintrude/Irmtrud, Ermenfrid, Ermengarde/Ermegard/Irmgard, Ermengild/Hermenegild, Ermenhild/Imelda	possibly theophoric, see Irminsul; hypocorisms Irma, Armin, Emma
ise(n)	iron	check	check	Isebert/Isebrecht, Isegrim/Isegrimm/Isengrim, Isenhart, IJsbrand	Isegrim may in origin have been a kenning for "wolf".
jut-	a tribal name	check		Judida, Judinga, Jutcar, Judilidis, Jutrad, Joduin, Judelhildis	probably from the name of the Juthungi or the Jutes
jung	young	check		Jungarat, Jungericus, Jungulf, Jugenprand	8th to 10th century, rare (used more rarely than ald- "old")
karl, carl, ceorl	free (about man)	check	check	Carlofred, Carlman; Altcarl, Gundecarl	rare; possibly extensions from the simplex.
*kōni-; cen, coen	fierce, keen	check		Conrad/Konrad, Cynric, Coenwulf	
*kun(n)i-, OHG kuni, chun, also chim, chin, chind; AS cyne	royal, of a king; kin, offspring, child	check		Kunibert, Kunimund, Cynewulf, Kunigunde, Cynegyth, Cynethryth, Cyneric, Chindasuinth, Adelchind, Drudchind, Widukind, Willekind	hypocorism Kuno, Chintila
*kunþ-; cuþ	renowned	check		Cuthbert, Cuthred, Cuthwulf	
kwik-; cwic	alive, lively	check		Cwichelm	
laik	play, dance	check	check	Ekkileich, Albleih, Amalleih, Ásleikr/Oslac, Audolecus, Perlaicus, Perahteih, Chinileihc, Dagaleich, Fridileih, Frotalaicus, Folcleih, Gozleih, Gundelaicus, Halulec, Hildelaicus, Hugilaih/Hyglac, Isanleih, Mathlec, Radleic, Sigelac, Wadelaicus, Walalaicho, Waldleich, Werinleih, Widolaic, Willileih, Winileih, Wolfleiga, Zitleich	possibly as first element in Leikert, Leuckart; Laigobert
laif, laf, leib	survivor, heir	check	check	Eggileib, Albleib, Olaf, Oslef, Athulef, Adalleib, Otleib, Berahtleib, Dagalaif, Danleib, Dotleib, Truhtleib, Edilef, Fridaleib, Folkleib, Guntaleiba, Hartleib, Haduleif, Herleif, Hiltileip, Hordleif, Hunleib, Isanleib, Mahtleip, Nordleip, Ortlaip, Ratleib, Reginleib, Richleib, Sileif, Starcleib, Thiotleip, Wiglaf, Wineleib, Wolleip, Wulfleip, Wunnileif, Zehaleip; Leibuni/Leiboin, Leibher, Leibhilt, Leibrat, Leibwart	the probable original meaning "heir of" suggests that this element at first appeared only as second element; it was from an early time it conflated with liub "dear". In Old Norse also used as a simplex, Leifr "heir".
laith	dangerous, hostile	check	check	Ansleth, Wolfleit; Leitbraht, Leitfrid, Leither, Leidmuot, Laidarat, Laidoin, Laidulf	rare
land, lant	land	check	check	Acland, Ingaland, Oslant, Osterlant, Auilant, Perelant, Perahtland, Cululant, Thruadland, Frotland, Gerland, Gotlanda, Grimland, Gundoland, Artaland, Hasland, Hiltiland, Hrodlant, Itislant, Inlant, Ermoland/Hermenland, Madoland, Meginland, Odallant, Ratland, Roland, Landon, Gagentland, Ricland, Sigilant, Wariland, Wiclant, Vulfland; Landolin, Landbold, Lambert/Landberta, Lampert, Landeberga, Lamprand, Lantbodo, Landfrid, Lampfrid, Landagar, Landegaus, Landgrim, Landegunda, Lantheida, Landohard, Lanthar, Landohildis, Landerich, Landswinda, Landoald, Landwih, Landuin, Landulf	Name by place of residence, origin, birth
laug	bride(?)		check	Alblaug/Alflaug, Adallouc/Aðallaug, Ólaug, Árlaug, Arnlaug, Áslaug, Perahtlouc, Eyðleyg/Edlaug, Droplaug, Dýrlaug, Ellaug, Ercanloug, Fastlaug, FInnlaug, Fridlaug, Grímlaug, Gerlaug, Gundlauc/Gunnlaug, Heiðlaug, Hiltilauc, Hrafnlaug, Íslaug, Jerlaug, Kristlaug, Ratlauga, Róslaug, Sigilouc/Siglaug, Sollaug, Sturlaug, Swanaloug/Svanlaug, Sveinlaug, Týlaugr, Triulaug, Vélaug, Wiglauh/Víglaugr, Þórlaug, Þraslaug	only as a suffix in feminine names; the suffix is presumably from a root *lug "to celebrate marriage; to be dedicated, promised (in marriage)"
leon	lion	check		Leonard	
lind	soft, mild, alternatively "shield" (made of linden tree) in ON, OHG and OE)	check	check	Gislinde, Heidelinde, (H)Ermelinda, Kristlind, Odelinde, Siglind/Sieglinde, Theodolinda, Þórlindur; Linddís, Lindolf, Lindvald, Lindvardh, Linveig	very frequent as a second element in feminine names
liub, leof	loved, beloved, dear	check		Leofric, Leofwine, Leofwynn, Leofgyth	
liut(i)	people	check		Liutger/Leodegar, Luther, Lutold; Liutgard, Leudwinus/Liutwin, Luitpold/Leopold, Liutprand	
magan, megin; maht	might, strength	check		Maganradus/Meinrad; Mathilde, Meinfrida, Meinhard	
man, mann	man, person	check	check	Manfred, Herman, German, Norman	
*mēri-; mære, mer, mar, mir	famous	check	check	Adelmar, Chlodomir, Marwig, Miro, Filimer/Filimir, Hreiðmarr, Odomir/Otmar/Ottomar/Othmar/Ademar, Dietmar, Agilmar/Ilmar/Elmar, Ricimer, Richimir, Theodemir, Theodemar, Thiudimer, Sigmar, Ingemar/Ingmar, Valamir, Waldemar/Vladimir, Wilmer, Vidimir/Widemir, Wulfmar/Wulfomir	
mund, mond	protection		check	Edmund, Erlemund, Kunimund, Sigmund, Rechimund, Reginmund/Raymond, Remismund, Normund	
niw, niwi, niu, nia	new	check	check	Adalniu, Baudonivia, Dagný, Folcniu, Nibumir, Nivulf, Niwirat, Niwirich, Odalniu, Signý/Sigeneow, Teudonivia	
noþ, OHG nand	courage	check	check	Nanthild, Notburga, Nothhelm; Byrhtnoth, Eadnoth, Ferdinand, Folcnand, Wieland/Wayland	
nord, nor, ON norðr	north	check		Norman, Normund, Norbert	also in use as the first element in Norway
ræð	counsel, wisdom	check	check	Radegast, Radwig, Radulf; Alfred, Eadred, Conrad, Tancred, Wihtred; Ratberga/Redburga	
ragin, regin	counsel	check		Raginald/Reginald/Reynold/Reinhold/Reynhold/Ronald, Reginbert, Reginmund/Raymond; Regintrud, Rægenhere, Ragnar	
*remez, remis	peace	check		Remisto, Remismund	
run	rune, secret		check	Gudrun, Walaruna	
rīki-; OHG rihhi, AS rīc, rech	ruler	check	check	Rigobert, Alaric, Ælfric, Beorthric, Brunric, Theodoric/Dietrich, Friedrich/Frederick, Richard, Richardis, Rictrude, Richilda, Rechila, Rechiar, Rechimund, Richimir, Rickstan, Eboric, Ulrich, Haidrich/Heidrich, Leofric, Wulfric, Roderick, Sigeric, Sedrick, Cedric, Chilperic, Theodoric, Henry/Heinrich, Eric, Godric	
sax, seax	seax; a tribal name	check		Sexred; Seaxburh	
sinþ, sind, siþ	travel, time	check	check	Sindolf/Sindulf, Sindram, Sindbald, Sindbert; Adalsinda	Sinthgunt as "Sun's sister" in the Merseburg Incantations
sig, sigi, sige, sieg, sigin	victory	check	check	Sigborg/Siborg, Sigebald/Sibbald/Sibold/Sinibaldo, Sigbod/Sibot, Sigibert/Sigebert, Sibrand, Sigmar, Sigmund, Sighart/Sicard, Sighelm, Sigher/Siger/Sighere, Sigrad/Sigered, Sigeric, Sigtrygg, Sigward/Siward, Sigfrid/Siegfried, Sigith/Sigesgundia, Sigvald, Sigwald/Siwald, Sigulf/Sigewulf/Siconulf; Ælfsige; Sigelinde/Siglind, Sigtrud	possibly theophoric in origin, in reference to Teiwaz, and later Odin, the god of victory. Hypocorisms Sigo, Sike, Sikke.
stan, sten	stone		check	Æthelstan, Thorsten, Wulfstan, Bertstan, Rickstan	also in simplex Sten, from Scandinavian Steinn
swint, swiþ	strength	check	check	Swithwulf, Swinthibald; Amalaswintha, Ealhswith; Swinthila	
tank	thought, counsel	check		Tancred/Dancrad, Dancmar, Tammaro	
trygg	truth		check	Sigtrygg	
wand, wandal	wander, wend	check		Wandefrid, Wandedrudis (f.), Vandebercth (7th century), Wandemar, Wandarich, Wendulf, Wanthildis (f., 9th century); Wandalbold (8th century), Wandalbert (7th-9th centuries), Wandalburgis (f., 10th-11th centuries), Wendilger (Old Saxon/Dutch)	in the names of the Vandals, Wends and Aurvandil
weald, wald, walt, wold / valdr	power, ruling, governance / ruler	check	check	Waldemar/Vladimir, Walther; Edwald, Ewald, Frithuwold, Harold, Sigwald/Siwald, Gerald, Gundoald, Waldwolf/Waldolf, Oswald/Ansaldo, Raginald/Reginald/Reynold/Reynhold/Reinhold/Ronald, Roald, Sigvald, Walfrid/Walfried	
warin; weard	guardian	check	check	Warinhari/Wernher/Werner; Brunward, Edward, Sigward; Freawaru, Ælfwaru	
wiht	wight, spirit	check		Wihtred	
wil(l)	will, desire	check		Wilhelm/William, Wilmer, Wilfred, Wilbert, Willihad, Willigip	
win, wini, wine	friend	check	check	Winibald, Winimund, Winibert; Ælfwine/Alboin, Alcuin, Aldoin, Baldwin, Darwin, Ecgwine, Edwin/Audoin, Erlwin, Erwin, Gerwin, Goswin, Leofwine, Oswin	
wig	battle, war	check	check	Wiglaf, Wigbert, Wigheard/Wighard; Clovis/Chlodwig/Ludwig/Louis, Hedwig, Marwig	
wal(a), wel, wæl	battle	check		Wieland/Wayland, Walaman, Walarad, Walerand, Walaruna, Walesinda, Wala-anc, Walahelm, Walaram/Waleran	hypocoristic Wallia, Walica. cf. Valhalla, Valkyrie, Valföðr etc.
wod	fury, mad (?)	check		Wodilhilt (f.), Wodalgarta (f.), Wodilbalt (a. 969), Wodalbert (a. 773), Wodelfrid (a. 912), Wodilulf (11th century), Vudamot (a. 821)	because of the close association with Wodanaz, these names are rare already in the OHG period, and fall out of use entirely during the High Middle Ages. Some hypocorisms such as Wote (a. 784), Woda (f., 8th century), Wodal (a. 889), Wode, Wodtke, may derive from this element. Wotan is recorded as a given name in the early 9th century. Association of most of these names with wod "fury" is uncertain, as there are the homophonic but unrelated roots of OHG watan "to wade" and wat "garment".
wid(u), wit, with	wood, forest	check		Withhold, Widukind	hypocorism Guido, Guy
wulf, wolf	wolf	check	check	Aethelwulf/Adolf, Arnulf, Atenulf, Beowulf, Brunulf/Brynolf/Brunolf/Brynjolfr/Brunulphe, Cuthwulf, Cynewulf, Eadwulf, Ealdwulf/Aldwulf, Eardwulf, Ernulf, Gangolf, Gundulf, Pandulf, Swithwulf, Rudolph; Wulfstan, Wolfgang, Wolfram, Wulf (etc.)	Especially as second element, -ulf, -olf is extremely common. Förstemann explains this as originally motivated by the wolf as an animal sacred to Wodanaz, but notes that the large number of names indicates that the element had become a meaningless suffix of male names at an early time. Förstemann counts 381 names in -ulf, -olf, among which only four are feminine. See also Offa (name)
wyn(n)	joy	check	check	Wynflæd; Ælfwynn, Ecgwynn, Brihtwyn	
þeod	people	check		Theodoric/Dietrich/Derick/Dirk, Detlef, Diether, Diethelm, Theobald, Dietfried, Theudebert, Theodemar; Dietlinde	
*þegnaz, degen	warrior, thane	check	check	Degenhard, Degericus; Deitdegen, Edildegan, Drûtdegan, Heridegan, Swertdegan, Volcdegen	
*þinga, þing	thing, concern	check		Þingfriþ	
þras	quarrelling, bickering	check		Thrassald, Þrassar	
þryþ, OH þrúðr, OE þrȳð, drut, trud, thrud, thryth	force, strength	check	check	Drutmund; Æthelthryth, Osthryth, Cynethryth, Ermintrude, Gertrude, Bertrude, Rictrude, Sæthryth, Waltrud/Waltraut	Names with this suffix are feminine only; Þrúðr is a daughter of Thor in Norse mythology. Short form Trudy, Trudi
þonar, donar, þór	(the god of) thunder	check	(rare)	Donarperht (9th century), Donarad (8th century), Þórarin, Þórhall, Þórkell, Þórfinnr, Þórvald, Þórvarðr, Þórgeir, Þórsteinn (9th century), Thunerulf/Þórolf; Albthonar (8th century)	These names appear from the 8th or 9th century; popular in Scandinavia during the 10th to 11th centuries. Förstemann 1199.
þurs, Thuris, Turis	giant	check		Thusnelda (1st century; presumably for *Thurishilda), Thurismund (6th century), Thurisind (6th century), Turisulfus	an archaic element in names of the migration period, extinct during the medieval period. Förstemann 1200.

== Monothematic names ==
Some medieval Germanic names are attested in simplex form. Some of these names originated as hypocorisms of full dithematic names, but in some cases they entered common usage and were no longer perceived as such. Examples include

- Masculine: Aldo (whence English Aldous), Adel, Anso/Anzo/Enzo, Folki/Folke/Fulco, Gero, Helmo/Elmo, Ise/Iso, Kuno, Lanzo, Manno, Odo/Otto, Rocco, Sten, Waldo, Warin, Wido, Wine, Wolf/Wulf
- Feminine: Adele, Alda, Bertha, Emma, Hilda, Ida, Isa, Linda, Oda

A major study of medieval Germanic monothematic names was undertaken by Van Loon, who (as translated and summarised by Ian Shiels) suggested the following types:

1. "Bare" names: a single word otherwise found in dithematic names (such as Old English Wig).
2. Unique names of unknown etymology (e.g. Old English Penda).
3. By-names (additional names that accompany a forename, potentially appellatives) (e.g. Old English Hengest and Horsa, both meaning "horse"). Other examples may include Old English Æsc "ash tree", Carl "free man" (Charles), Hengest "stallion", Raban "raven" (Rabanus Maurus), Hagano/Hagen "enclosure", Earnest "vigorous, resolute".
4. Theonyms (names of gods, e.g. Woden).
5. Names of legendary or mythical founders of peoples or dynasties (e.g. Ostrogothic Amal).
6. Names derived from a single name-element, transferred to the weak declension, sometimes with associated vowel-changes in the root-word (e.g. Old German Betto, from the Bert- element of Bertramnus).
7. Names derived from a dithematic name, contracted, and transferred to the weak declension (e.g. Old German Tammo, from Tancmarus).
8. Names derived from a single name-element or from a contracted dithematic name, with the addition of a suffix.
9. "Head-and-tail" contractions of dithematic names (e.g. Old Norse Gormr from—in Van Loon's view—goð + ormr).

=== Hypocoristic names ===
The processes whereby dithematic or monothematic names became hypocorisms (nicknames or pet names) were not, as of the beginning of the twenty-first century, well understood. But twenty-first-century research made some progress: Kendra Willson undertook a detailed study of Icelandic hypocorism, while Ian Shiels built on her work and Van Loon's to "suggest the outline [...] of an alternative approach to hypocorism [...] as a rule-based system of generative and transformational processes applied to dithematic names."

Some hypocorisms, called "head-and-tail" types by Van Loon, retain a remnant of their second element. Late medieval Flemish/Dutch examples cited by him include Arnoud > Arend/Ært; Bernard > Bernd; Cunrad > Kurt; Diederik > Dirk; Gerard > Geert; Everhard > Evert; and Wilhelm > Willem. Whereas Loon doubted that this pattern existed in the early Germanic languages, Ian Shiels has argued that it is found in early Old Norse and Old English naming.

Sometimes the second element is so reduced that it cannot be identified unambiguously any longer: Curt/Kurt may abbreviate either Conrad or Cunibert.

== Bynames ==
Germanic names often feature a range of bynames: additional names that accompany a 'forename'. These can be toponymic (locational), occupational, genealogical, or 'nicknames'.

== Uncertain etymology ==
- Gustav has been interpreted by e.g. Elof Hellquist (1864 - 1939) Swedish linguist specialist in North Germanic languages as gauta-stabaz (gauta-stabaR) "staff of the Goths"
- Old English Pǣga (unknown meaning)
- Waldo from Old English Waltheof (unknown meaning)
- Pepin
- Morcar
- Zotto
- Cleph
- Pemmo

== See also ==
- Dutch name
- German name
- German family name etymology
- Scandinavian family name etymology
- Germanic placename etymology
  - German placename etymology
  - List of generic forms in British place names
- List of names of Odin
- Slavic names
- Germanic personal names in Galicia
- Germanic names in Italy

== Reference bibliography ==
- Colman, Fran (2014). The Grammar of Names in Anglo-Saxon England: The Linguistics and Culture of the Old English Onomasticon. Oxford linguistics. Oxford University Press. ISBN 9780198701675.
- Olof von Feilitzen, The Pre-conquest Personal Names of Domesday Book (1937).
- E. Förstemann, Altdeutsches Namenbuch (1856; online facsimile)
- Förstemann, Ernst (1900). Altdeutsches Namenbuch (3 ed.). Bonn: P. Hanstein. Archived from the original on 2016-03-05.
- Lena Peterson, Nordiskt runnamnslexikon, 4th ed. (2002); 5th ed. (2007).
- P. R. Kitson, (2002). How Anglo-Saxon personal names work. Nomina, 24, 93.
- F. C. Robinson, (1968). The significance of names in old English literature. Anglia, 86, 14–58.
- Justus Georg Schottel, De nominibus veterum Germanorum, in: Ausführliche Arbeit Von der Teutschen Haubt-Sprache, Zilliger (1663), book 5, chapter 2, pp. 1029–1098.
- Franz Stark, Die Kosenamen der Germanen: eine Studie: mit drei Excursen: 1. Über Zunamen; 2. Über den Ursprung der zusammengesetzten Namen; 3. Über besondere friesische Namensformen und Verkürzungen, 1868.
- Friedrich Wilhelm Viehbeck, Die Namen der Alten teutschen: als Bilder ihres sittlichen und bürgerlichen Lebens (1818; online facsimile)
- H. B. Woolf, (1939). The old Germanic principles of name-giving. Baltimore: Johns Hopkins University Press.
- H. C. Wyld, (1910). Old Scandinavian personal names in England. Modern Language Review, 5, 289–296.
- Charlotte Mary Yonge, History of Christian names, vol. 2, Parker and Bourn, 1863.
- Schönfeld, Moritz (1911). Wörterbuch der altgermanischen Personen- und Völkernamen. Heidelberg: C. Winter.
