= Brandsen (surname) =

Brandsen is a Dutch and Danish patronymic surname derived from the given name Brand, a short form of names, such as Gerbrand, Hildebrand, IJsbrand. Notable people with the surname include:

- Bertus Brandsen (1914–2001), Dutch politician
- Federico de Brandsen (1785–1827), French-Argentine colonel

== See also ==
- Brandsen, a city in Argentina
- Brandsma
