= Sicard =

Sicard may refer to:

- Sicard (given name)
- Sicard (surname)
- USS Sicard (DD-346), a Clemson class destroyer in the United States Navy
- Sicard Flat, California, an unincorporated community in Yuba County, California
