= Ubaldo =

Ubaldo is a masculine Italian and Spanish given name, from Germanic hug "mind" and bald "bold". Notable people with the name include:

- Ubald of Gubbio (Ubaldo Baldassini) (c. 1084 – 1160), Italian bishop and Catholic saint
- Guido Ubaldo Abbatini (1600–1656), Italian painter of the Baroque period
- Ubaldo Aquino (born 1958), football (soccer) referee from Paraguay
- Ubaldo Bellugi (1899–1992), Italian poet, writer and playwright and Podestà of Massa
- Ubaldo Biordi (d. 2026), Sammarinese politician
- Ubaldo Caccianemici (died 1171), Italian cardinal and cardinal-nephew of Pope Lucius II
- Ubaldo Fillol (born 1950), Argentine football coach and former goalkeeper
- Ubaldo Gandolfi (1728–1781), Italian painter of the late-Baroque period
- Ubaldo Giraldi (1692–1775), Italian canonist
- Ubaldo Heredia (born 1956), former Major League Baseball right-handed starting pitcher
- Ubaldo I Visconti (died 1230), the de jure overlord of the Giudicato of Cagliari from 1217
- Ubaldo Jiménez (born 1984), Major League Baseball starting pitcher
- Ubaldo Mesa (1973–2005), male professional road cyclist from Colombia
- Ubaldo Miranda (born 1931), Brazilian football forward
- Ubaldo Nestor Sacco (1955–1997), Argentine boxer
- Ubaldo of Gallura, the Judge of Gallura from 1225 to his death in 1238
- Ubaldo Passalacqua (born 1918), Italian professional football player
- Ubaldo Ranzi, Italian bobsledder who competed in the late 1990s and the early 2000s
- João Ubaldo Ribeiro (born 1941), Brazilian author born in Itaparica, Bahia
- Ubaldo Ricci, Italian painter of the late-Baroque who practised in Italy in the 18th century
- Ubaldo Righetti (born 1963), retired Italian professional football player
- Ubaldo Soddu (1883–1949), Italian military officer, commanded the Italian Forces in the Greco-Italian War for a month
- Ubaldo Soto (born 2006), Dominican baseball player
- Ubaldo Terzano, Italian cinematographer and camera operator, with numerous collaborations with Mario Ubaldo

== See also ==
- Juan Ubaldo (born 1979), boxer from the Dominican Republic
- Marie-Claire D'Ubaldo
- Hucbald
- Saint Ubaldo Day, Jessup, Pennsylvania's observance of Gubbio, Italy's La Festa dei Ceri
