= Johann Christian Günther =

German poet (1695–1723)

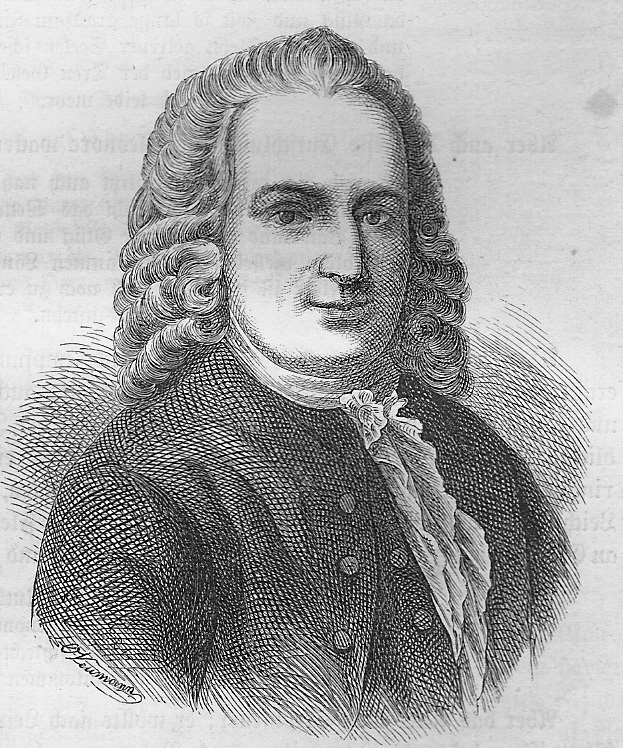
Johann Christian Günther

Johann Christian Günther (8 April 1695 – 15 March 1723) was a German poet from Striegau in Lower Silesia. After attending the gymnasium at Schweidnitz, he was sent in 1715 by his father, a country doctor, to study medicine at Wittenberg; but he was idle and dissipated, had no taste for the profession chosen for him, and came to a complete rupture with his family. In 1717 he went to Leipzig, where he was befriended by Johann Burkhard Mencke (1674–1732), who recognized his genius; and there he published a poem on the peace of Passarowitz (concluded between the German emperor and the Porte in 1718) which acquired him reputation. A recommendation from Mencke to Frederick Augustus II of Saxony, king of Poland, proved worse than useless, as Günther appeared at the audience drunk. From that time he led an unsettled and dissipated life, sinking ever deeper into the slough of misery, until he died at Jena on March 15, 1723, when only in his 28th year. Goethe pronounces Günther to have been a poet in the fullest sense of the term. His lyric poems as a whole give evidence of deep and lively sensibility, fine imagination, clever wit, and a true ear for melody and rhythm; but an air of cynicism is more or less present in most of them, and dull or vulgar witticisms are not infrequently found side by side with the purest inspirations of his genius.

== Works ==
- Günther's collected poems were published in four volumes (Breslau, 1723–1735).
  - They are also included in vol. vi. of Julius Tittmann's Deutsche Dichter des 17ten Jahrh. (Leipzig, 1874), and vol. xxxviii. of Kurschner's Deutsche Nationalliteratur (1883).
- A pretended autobiography of Günther appeared at Schweidnitz in 1732, and a life of him by Siebrand at Leipzig in 1738. See:
  - Hoffmann von Fallersleben, J. Gb. Günther (Breslau, 1833)
  - O. Roquette, Leben und Dichten J. Ch. Günthers (Stuttgart, 1860)
  - M. Kalbeck, Neue Beiträge zur Biographie des Dichters C. Günther (Breslau, 1879).
