= Isebrand =

Isebrand is a West Germanic given name, secondarily also a surname. It most likely is composed of the element īsarn, "iron" in both Old High German and Old Saxon, or īs, "ice" in both Old High German and Old Saxon, (the Old Saxon dative form of īs being īse, "of ice"), and the Old High German brant or Old Saxon brand both meaning "flame", "torch" or more poetically "sword". Notable people with the name include:

- Wulf Isebrand (d. 1506), peasant leader at the Battle of Hemmingstedt
- Marion Isebrand, wife of William Harrison (clergyman)

== See also ==
- Sibrand (disambiguation)
