= Diethelm =

Diethelm may refer to:

== Surnames ==
- Barbara Diethelm (born 1962), Swiss painter
- Caspar Diethelm (1926–1997), Swiss composer
- Hans Diethelm (born 1967), Swiss former skier
- Michael Diethelm (born 1985), Swiss footballer
- Pascal Diethelm (born 1944), Swiss anti-tobacco activist
- Rolf Diethelm (born 1940), Swiss former ice hockey player

== First names ==
- Diethelm Ferner (born 1941), German football coach
- Diethelm Sack (born 1948), German businessman
- Diethelm von Eichel-Streiber (1914–1996), German Luftwaffe pilot

== Middle names ==
- Heidi Diethelm Gerber (born 1969), Swiss sport shooter

== See also ==
- 24858 Diethelm, an asteroid named after Swiss astronomer Roger Diethelm
