= Anduin =

- Anduin, a river in the fictional universe of Middle-earth
- Anduin Wrynn, a fictional character in the Warcraft video game series

== See also ==
- AnduinOS, a Linux distribution
- Alduin
