= Imelda (disambiguation) =

Imelda is a feminine given name.

Imelda may also refer to:

== Places ==
=== Philippines ===
- Imelda, Biliran, a village named after Imelda Marcos
- Imelda, Bohol, a village named after Imelda Marcos
- Imelda, Zamboanga Sibugay, a municipality named after Imelda Marcos
- Imelda, Tubajon, barangay in the Philippines

== Other uses ==
- 34919 Imelda, an Outer Main-belt Asteroid
- Imelda de' Lambertazzi, tragic opera
- Imelda (butterfly), a genus of metalmark butterflies in the subfamily Riodininae
- Imelda (film), a 2003 film about Imelda Marcos
- "Imelda", song on Mark Knopfler's 1996 album Golden Heart
- List of storms named Imelda, three tropical cyclones worldwide
