= Sichardus =

Sichardus or Sichard may refer to:

- alternate spelling of Sicard (given name)
- Johannes Sichardus (1499–1552), German humanist
