= Bellugi =

Bellugi is an Italian surname. Notable people with the surname include:

- Alba Gaïa Bellugi (born 1995), French actress and older sister of Galatea
- Galatea Bellugi (born 1997), French actress and younger sister of Alba Gaïa
- Mauro Bellugi (1950–2021), Italian footballer
- Piero Bellugi (1924–2012), Italian conductor
- Ubaldo Bellugi (1899–1992), Italian poet, writer and playwright
- Ursula Bellugi (1931–2022), American linguist and psychologist
