= Morgenlien =

Morgenlien is a Norwegian surname. Notable people with the surname include:

- Holm Sigvald Morgenlien (1909–1995), Norwegian politician
- Svein Gunnar Morgenlien (1922–2016), Norwegian trade unionist and politician
