= Sigmar =

Sigmar may refer to:

- Sigmar (given name), a masculine given name
- Sigmar (Marvel Comics), a fictional character in the Marvel Comics universe
- Sigmar (Warhammer), a fictional deified emperor in the Warhammer Fantasy setting
