= Pandolfo =

Pandolfo is the Italian form of the masculine given name Pandulf. Notable people with the name include:

== Given name ==
- Pandolfo da Lucca (1101–1201), 12th-century Italian cardinal
- Pandolfo I Malatesta (c. 1267–1326), Italian condottiero and Lord of Rimini
- Pandolfo II Malatesta (1325–1373), Italian condottiero
- Pandolfo III Malatesta (c. 1369–1427), Italian condottiero and lord of Fano
- Pandolfo IV Malatesta (1475–1534), Italian condottiero and lord of Rimini
- Pandolfo Petrucci (1452–1512), ruler of the Italian city of Siena during the Renaissance
- Pandolfo Reschi (1643–1699), Italian painter
- Pandolfo Savelli (died 1306), Italian statesman
- Pandolfo da Polenta (died 1347), joint lord of Ravenna and Cervia
- Sigismondo Pandolfo Malatesta (1417–1468), Italian condottiero

== Surname ==
- Jay Pandolfo (born 1974), American hockey player
- Mike Pandolfo (born 1979), American professional ice hockey left wing
- Nina Pandolfo (born 1997), Brazilian street artist
- Palo Pandolfo (1964–2021), Argentine singer, guitarist and producer
- Paolo Pandolfo (born 1959), Italian composer and teacher of music
- Samuel Pandolfo (1874–1960), American businessman

== See also ==
- Pandolfo Malatesta (disambiguation)
- Gallucci
