= Alcmund =

Alcmund may refer to:

- Alcmund of Hexham (died 780 or 781), saint, bishop of Hexham
- Alcmund of Derby (died c. 800), saint, also known as Alcmund of Lilleshall

== See also ==
- Ealhmund
