= Sicard (surname) =

Sicard is a surname of French and Italian origin. Notable people with the name include:

- Arthur Sicard (1876-1946), Québécois engineer and inventor
- Claude Sicard (1677–1726), French Jesuit priest and an early modern visitor to Egypt
- François-Léon Sicard (1862–1934), French sculptor
- Jean-Athanase Sicard (1872–1929), French neurologist and radiologist
- Jean Sicard (composer) (17th century–18th century), French singer and a composer, and father of Mme Sicard
- Louis Sicard (1871 - 1946), French sculptor, ceramist, writer and teacher.
- Mme Sicard (fl. 1678), French composer and daughter of Jean Sicard
- Maurice-Yvan Sicard (1910–2000), French journalist
- Montgomery Sicard (1836–1900), Rear Admiral in the United States Navy
- Pedro Sicard (born 1968), Mexican actor
- Roch-Ambroise Cucurron Sicard (1742-1822), French abbé and instructor of deaf
- Romain Sicard (born 1988), French professional racing cyclist
