= Sankt Wolfgang (disambiguation) =

Sankt Wolfgang is a German municipality of the district of Erding (Bavaria).

Sankt Wolfgang may also refer to:

- Wolfgang of Regensburg (Sankt Wolfgang), German Christian saint
- St. Wolfgang im Salzkammergut, Austrian municipality of the district of Gmunden (Upper Austria)
- Sankt Wolfgang-Kienberg, Austrian municipality in the district of Judenburg (Styria)

== See also ==
- Wolfgang (disambiguation)
