= Richardis (given name) =

- Gender: Female

Richardis is a feminine given name, from Germanic rik ("ruler") and gard ("enclosure" or "yard"). It is unrelated to the name Richard, which is from rik and hard ("hard", "brave", "powerful"). Notable people with the name include:

- Richardis (c. 840–between 894 and 896), Holy Roman Empress and Roman Catholic saint
- Richardis of Sualafeldgau (945/50-994), the first Austrian royal consort, married to Leopold I, Margrave of Austria
- Richardis of Bavaria (1173-1231), wife of Otto I, Count of Guelders
- Richardis of Jülich (1314–1360), Duchess consort of Lower Bavaria
- Richardis of Schwerin, Duchess of Schleswig (died before 1386), wife of Valdemar III of Denmark (Valdemar V, Duke of Schleswig) and aunt of the second Richardis
- Richardis of Schwerin, Queen of Sweden (c. 1347–1377), wife of Albert of Sweden and niece of the first Richardis
- Richardis von Stade, 12th century German nun and Benedictine abbess of Bassum Abbey
- Richardis Catherine of Mecklenburg (1370–1400), daughter of Albert of Sweden and wife of John of Bohemia

== See also ==
- Richard
- Richarda
- Richardia
