= Hyglac =

Hyglac is an early Germanic personal name, known through northern Europe, Scandinavia and Anglo-Saxon England. It derives from Proto-Germanic *Hugilaikaz, from *hugjaną "courage" (see the name Hugh) + -laikaz ("ritual").

The following people are known by the name:

- Saint Hyglac, Anglo-Saxon Saint
- King Hygelac (Beowulf)
