= Alarico =

Alarico could be both a masculine given name and a surname. Notable people with this name include:

- Alarico Fernandes, Timorese politician
- Alarico Gattia (1927–2022), Italian artist
- Flávio Alarico (c. 715 – c. 760), nobleman

== See also ==
- Alaric (name)
