= Waleran =

Waleran, Galeran, or Walram is a Germanic first name, common in the Middle Ages, that may refer to:

- Waleran I of Limburg (died 1082)
- Waleran the Hunter (fl. 1086)
- Walram (bishop of Naumburg) (died 1111)
- Waleran of Le Puiset (died 1126), crusader
- Waleran, Duke of Lower Lorraine (c. 1085–1139)
- Waleran de Beaumont, 1st Earl of Worcester (1104–1166)
- Waleran (bishop of Rochester) (died 1184)
- Waleran III of Meulan (died 1191), co-Count of Meulan with his father, member of the Third Crusade
- Walram I, Count of Nassau (died 1198)
- Waleran de Beaumont, 4th Earl of Warwick (1153–1204)
- Waleran III of Limburg (c. 1165–1226), Duke of Limburg, Lord of Montjoie, Count of Luxembourg and Count of Arlon
- Walram II, Count of Nassau (died 1276)
- Waleran IV, Duke of Limburg (died 1279)
- Galeran of Ivry (fl. 1272–1280), seneschal of the kingdom of Sicily, first bailli and vicar-general in the principality of Achaea
- Waleran I, Lord of Ligny (died 1288)
- Walram, Count of Jülich (died 1297)
- Walram of Jülich (died 1349), archbishop of Cologne
- Waleran II, Lord of Ligny (died 1354)
- Walram, Count of Sponheim-Kreuznach (died 1380)
- Walram IV, Count of Nassau-Idstein (1354–1393)
- Walram of Thierstein (died 1403), Lord of Pfeffingen
- Waleran III, Count of Ligny (1355–1415)
- Waleran de Wellesley (died 1276), judge, member of the Privy Council of Ireland and landowner, ancestor of the Duke of Wellington

== See also ==
- Walerand (disambiguation)
- Galeran de Bretagne, a chanson de geste
