= Brandsma =

Brandsma is a Frisian languages surname (this includes Dutch surnames). It is a patronymic surname derived from the given name Brand/Brands with the Frisian patronymic suffix '-ma'. Notable people with the surname include:

- Jacob Brandsma (1898–1976), Dutch rower
- Jo Brandsma (1900–1973), Dutch rower
- Titus Brandsma (1881–1942), Dutch Carmelite friar, Catholic priest, and professor of philosophy

== See also ==
- Brandsen
