= Sigvald =

Sigvald may refer to:

- Sigvald Asbjørnsen (1867–1954), Norwegian born American sculptor
- Sigvald Oppebøen Hansen (born 1950), Norwegian politician for the Labour Party
- Sigvald Hasund (1868–1959), Norwegian researcher of agriculture and politician for the Liberal Party
- Sigvald Jarl, son of Strut-Harald the Jarl of Skåne and the brother of Thorkell the Tall (Torkjell Høge)
- Sigvald Johannesson (1877–1953), Danish-American civil engineer known for his design of the Pulaski Skyway
- Holm Sigvald Morgenlien (1909–1995), Norwegian politician for the Labour Party
- Oscar Sigvald Julius Strugstad (1851–1919), Norwegian military officer and politician
- Oscar Sigvald Strugstad (1887–1953), Norwegian military officer
- Sigvald Svendsen (1895–1956), Norwegian politician for the Liberal Party

== See also ==
- Sigvalue
