= Landon =

Landon is a personal name and surname of English origin that means "long hill". It is a variant of Langdon.

Landon became popular as a given name in the United States in the 1990s, and by 2010 was the 32nd most popular name for boys.

== Notable people with the given name "Landon" include ==
- Landon Ashworth (born 1984), American actor
- Landon Bow (born 1995), Canadian ice hockey player
- Landon Brown (born 1987), American politician
- Landon Bussie (born 1988), American basketball coach
- Landon Carter (1710–1778), American planter
- Landon Carter (of Cleve) (1751–1811), American planter
- Landon Cassill (born 1989), American stock car driver
- Landon Cider, American drag king
- Landon T. Clay (1926–2017), American businessman
- Landon Cohen (born 1986), American football player
- Landon Collins (born 1994), American football player
- Landon Deireragea (born 1960), Nauruan politician
- Landon Dickerson (born 1998), American football player
- Landon Donovan (born 1982), American soccer player
- Landon Duckworth (born 2007), American football player
- Landon Ferraro (born 1991), Canadian ice hockey player
- Landon Fox, American football coach
- Landon Garland (1810–1895), American academic administrator
- Landon Carter Haynes (1816–1875), American politician
- Landon Huffman (born 1996), American stock car racing driver
- Landon Jackson (born 2003), American football player
- Landon Johnson (born 1981), American football player
- Landon Jones (1943-2024), American editor
- Landon Liboiron (born 1990), Canadian actor
- Landon Ling (born 1987), Canadian soccer player
- Landon Mackenzie (born 1954), Canadian artist
- Landon Milbourne (born 1987), American basketball player
- Landon Morris (born 2002), American football player
- Landon Curt Noll (born 1960), American computer scientist
- Landon Parvin (born 1948), American speechwriter
- Landon Pearson (1930–2023), Canadian politician
- Landon Pembelton (born 2005), American stock car racing driver
- Landon Pigg (born 1983), American musician
- Landon Powell (born 1982), American baseball player
- Landon Rice (born 1988), Canadian football player
- Landon Robinson (born 2003), American football player
- Landon Ronald (1873–1938), English conductor
- Landon T. Ross Jr. (1942–2016), American environmental biologist
- Landon H. Rowland (1937–2015), American businessman
- Landon Sears (born 1997), American singer
- Landon Sexton (born 1941), Canadian politician
- Landon Sims (born 2001), American baseball player
- Landon Tengwall (born 2002), American football commentator
- Landon Addison Thomas (1799–1889), American politician
- Landon Trusty (born 1981), American football player
- Landon Turner (born 1993), American football player
- Landon Turner (basketball) (born 1960), American basketball player
- Landon Wendler (born 2000), American freestyle skier
- Landon Wilson (born 1975), American ice hockey player
- Landon Young (born 1997), American football player

== Surname "Landon" ==
- Landon (surname)

== Fictional characters ==
- Jodie Landon, on the television series Daria
- Landon Ricketts, a supporting character in the video game Red Dead Redemption
