= Osbert =

Osbert is a male Germanic given name and a surname, composed of the elements ans/os "god", and berht "bright".

== Given name ==
=== Pre-modern era ===
- Osbert or Osberht of Northumbria (died 867), King of Northumbria
- Osbert or Osbeorn Bulax (died c. 1054), son of Siward, Earl of Northumbria
- Osbert de Bayeux (fl. 1121−1184), medieval English cleric and archdeacon
- Osbert of Clare (died in or after 1158), monk, elected prior of Westminster Abbey and briefly abbot, writer, hagiographer and forger of charters
- Osbert of Dunblane (died 1230), Bishop of Dunblane
- Osbert de Longchamp (c. 1155−before 1208), Anglo-Norman administrator
- Osbert fitzHervey (died 1206), Anglo-Norman royal judge

=== Modern world ===
- O. G. S. Crawford (1886−1957), English archaeologist and a pioneer in the use of aerial photographs in his field
- Osbert Lancaster (1908−1986), English cartoonist, author, art critic and stage designer
- Osbert Mackie (1869−1927), English rugby union centre and Anglican priest
- Osbert Molyneux, 6th Earl of Sefton (1871−1930), British courtier and Liberal politician
- Osbert Mordaunt (cricketer, born 1876) (1876−1949), English cricketer
- Osbert Peake, 1st Viscount Ingleby (1897−1966), British Conservative Party politician
- Osbert Salvin (1835−1898), English naturalist, ornithologist and herpetologist
- Osbert Sitwell (1892−1969), English writer

== Surname ==
- Alphonse Osbert (1857-1939), French painter
- William Fitz Osbert (died 1196), champion of the poor in London
