= Sigered =

Sigered is an Anglo-Saxon masculine personal name, from siġe "victory" and ræd "counsel", that may refer to:

- Sigered of Essex
- Sigered of Kent
