= Richarda =

Richarda is a feminine given name which may refer to:

- Richarda or Richardis of Sualafeldgau (945/50-994), the first Austrian royal consort, married to Leopold I, Margrave of Austria
- Richarda of the Marck, wife of Bernard V, Lord of Lippe who, upon his death before 1365, gave his lands to first Otto VI of Tecklenburg, then to Simon III, Lord of Lippe, starting a decades-long feud
- Richarda Morrow-Tait, first woman to fly around the world (1948–49)
- Richarda Schmeißer (born 1954), German retired gymnast

== See also ==
- Richard
- Richardis (given name)
