= Diether =

Diether is a German given name, composed of the elements diet "people" and her "army".

It is distinct from, but in Modern German has become homophonic with, the name Dieter, which is a short form of Dietrich, composed of the same prefix but the unrelated suffix rihhi "rich".

People called Diether include:

- Diether von Isenburg (d. 1482)
- Diether von Roeder (d. 1918), eponymous of German destroyer Z17 Diether von Roeder
- Diether Lukesch (1918–2004)
- Diether Posser (1922–2010)
- Diether Haenicke (1935–2009)
- Diether Kunerth (1940–2024)
- Diether Krebs (1947–2000)
- Diether Ocampo (b. 1973)
- Diether Perez (b. 2001)
- Diether Ong (b. 2011)

== See also ==
- Germanic name
- Ether
