= Barbara Diethelm =

Swiss painter (born 1962)

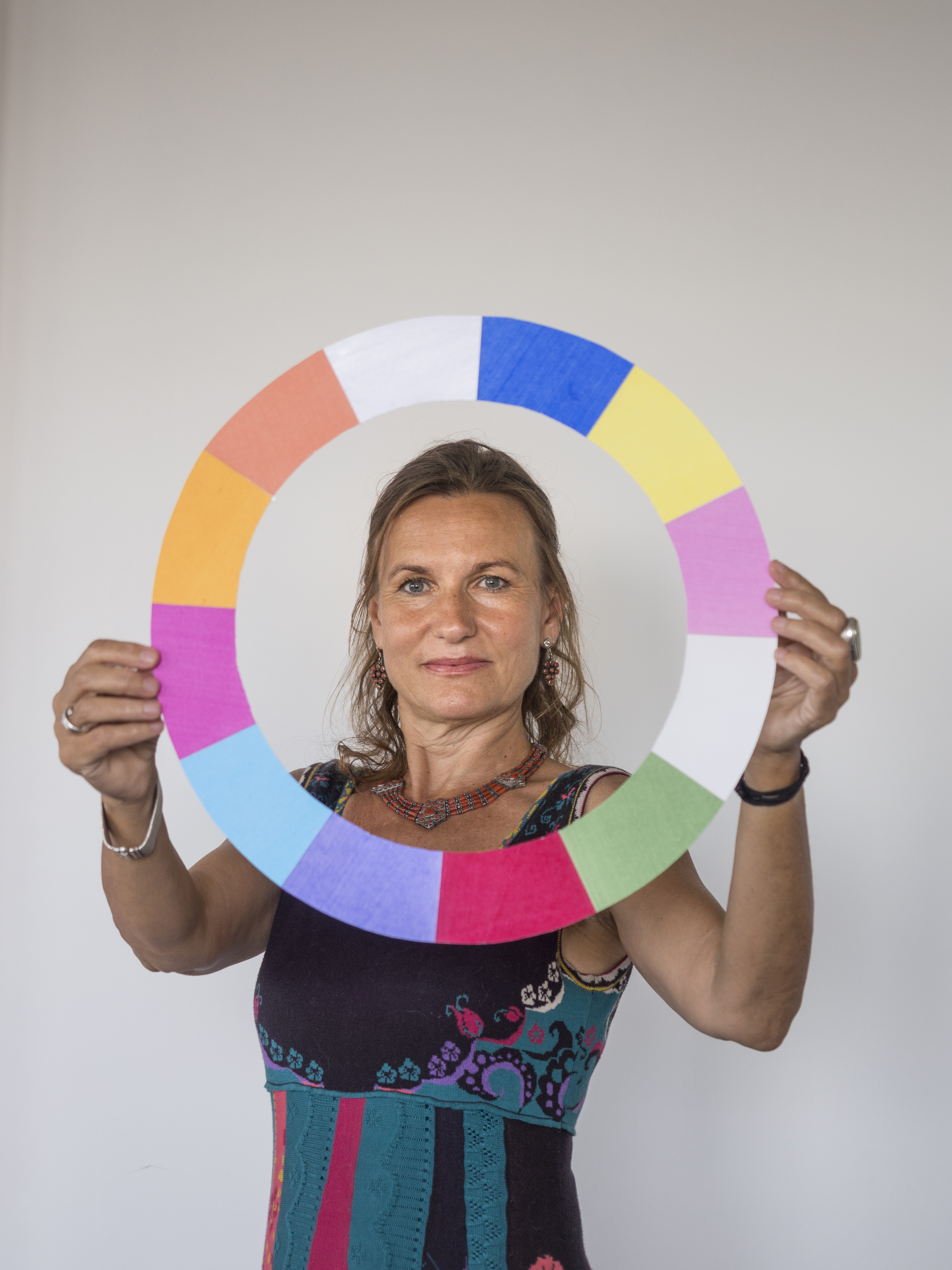
- Barbara Diethelm in 2015
- Born: 12 April 1962 (age 64); Zürich, Switzerland
- Education: St. Mary's University, Texas, San Antonio and San Francisco Art Institute
- Known for: Painting, drawing, producer of artists' colours

Barbara Diethelm (born 12 April 1962) is a Swiss painter, drawer and producer of artists' colours.

== Education ==
Diethelm was born on 12 April 1962 in Zürich. Since her early childhood colour has played a major role for Barbara Diethelm and she developed a sensitivity for colour and an appreciation for the use of paint. After finishing college in Zürich, she moved to the United States in 1982. She studied graphic design from 1983 to 1985 and fine arts until 1988 at San Antonio College under the instruction of Mel Casas, Mark Pritchett and Tom Willome. At the same time, she studied Humanities and Business at the St. Mary's University in San Antonio. She continued studying painting and printmaking from 1988 to 1990 at the San Francisco Art Institute under the instruction of Sam Tchakalian and Ivan Majdrakoff. During that time, she devoted herself to Far Eastern philosophy and yoga, which has reflected in her artistic work from then on. In 1992, she visited the artist Agnes Martin for a longer period in Galisteo, New Mexico, which made a longlasting impression.

== Colour as connecting element ==
After her return to Switzerland, in the beginning of the 1990s, she developed her painting in various groups of work. Furthermore, Barbara Diethelm took over the family business Lascaux Colours & Restauro after her father's death in 1995. She is specifically interested in the development of holistic colour concepts and she developed the colour system Sirius Primary System in 1996. This extended five-colours-system was patented by the European Patent Office. Her objective as a painter and as a producer of paint for artists is to combine the mental and creative level with the physical and manifest.

In 2004, she founded the nonprofit foundation Fondation Lascaux with her husband, the painter Werner Schmidt.

== Artistic work ==
Since Barbara Diethelm is familiar with the production of paints, her artistic work revolves around an alchemy of colour: material properties of paint, its aesthetic aspects, up to its spiritual energy and interplay of colours. Barbara Diethelm said in an interview, that everything is a remembering of a deeper knowledge, the knowledge about the unity with the cosmic harmony. She wants to awaken the sense of harmony and balance, which appears in the light of nature.

Since 1985, Barbara Diethelm regularly displays her work in solo and group exhibitions in Switzerland, Italy and the USA.

== Publications ==
- Barbara Diethelm (drawings) and Werner Schmidt (poems), Tamangur. Of cats and stars., Wolfbach Verlag, Zürich 2012. ISBN 978-3-905910-25-4
- Catalogue Barbara Diethelm, Silver Banks. Galerie Susi Landolf, 2005. ISBN 3-9521130-4-2
- Catalogue Barbara Diethelm, New Paintings. Galerie Susi Landolf, 2002. ISBN 3-9521130-3-4
- Catalogue Barbara Diethelm, Argus. with texts by Serpoohi Benazzi-Pilosian. Galerie Susi Landolf, 1996. ISBN 3-9521130-0-X
- Light in the body – body in the light. Revisioning the balance of light and dark. In Proceedings of the CIE centenary Conference “Towards a new century of light”. Paris, 15–16 April 2013, p. 1162–1167. ISBN 978-3-902842-44-2
- The spirit of colours in the body of architecture. In Journal of Traditional Paint News. Vol. 3, No. 3, 2012, p. 27–33
- A holistic view of colour – a bridge between physics and metaphysics. In International Colour Association (AIC) (ed.), Interaction of Colour & Light in the Arts and Sciences, 7–10 June 2011. Book of Abstracts, Zürich 2011, p. 96. ISBN 978-3-033-02929-3
- Cosmic Colours. A paint-maker shares her discovery of the deeper meaning of colour. In Resurgence & Ecologist. 265, 2011, p. 48–49. ISSN 0034-5970
- Pigment – der Ton der Farbe. In Roland Aull (ed.), Farbe & Gesundheit. Callwey Verlag, Munich 2004, p. 84–92. ISBN 978-3766716064
