= Adelmar =

Adelmar may refer to:

- Adelmar Faria Coimbra-Filho (1924–2016), Brazilian biologist and primatologist
- Adelmar Tavares (1888–1963), Brazilian lawyer
- Javier Adelmar Zanetti (born 1973), Argentine footballer
- Estádio Adelmar da Costa Carvalho, a football stadium situated in Recife, Pernambuco, Brazil
