= Brynjólfur =

Brynjólfur [ˈprɪnˌjoulvʏr̥] is an Icelandic masculine given name. Notable people with the name include:

- Brynjólfur Bjarnason (1898–1989), Icelandic communist politician
- Brynjólfur Pétursson (1810–1851), Icelandic lawyer and government official
- Brynjólfur Sveinsson (1605–1675), Lutheran Bishop of the see of Skálholt in Iceland
- Brynjólfur Willumsson (born 2000), Icelandic footballer
