= Ingmar =

Male given name

Ingmar is a Scandinavian given name and is a composite of Ing, possibly a Norse god, and Mar, meaning "famous". The name element Ing is also found in Ingvar, Ingolf, Ingeborg, and other names. Its name day is June 3. See also Ingemar.

Ingmar may refer to:

- Ingmar Berga, Dutch speed skater
- Ingmar Bergman, Swedish film director
- Ingmar De Poortere, Belgian cyclist
- Ingmar De Vos, Belgian sports manager
- Ingmar Elfsborg, American Spoon Collector
- Ingmar Koch, German musician
- Ingmar Lazar, French pianist
- Ingmar Ljones, Norwegian politician
- Ingmar Hartwig, German designer
- Ingmar Ott, Estonian botanist
- Ingmar Vos, Dutch athlete
- Ingmar Zahorsky, German journalist
