= Æthelburh =

Æthelburh (sometimes Ethelburga) may refer to any of the following Anglo-Saxon women:

- Saint Æthelburh of Barking (died after 686/688), abbess of Barking
- Saint Æthelburh of Faremoutiers (died 664), princess and abbess
- Saint Æthelburh of Kent (died 647), queen consort of Northumbria
- Saint Æthelburh of Wilton (died 810), abbess of Wilton
