= Godgifu =

Godgifu is the name of:

- Lady Godiva (c. 997–1067), spelled Godgifu in Old English, Anglo-Saxon noblewoman
- Godgifu (daughter of Æthelred the Unready) (c. 1004–c. 1049/1056), daughter of King Æthelred the Unready, king of the English
