= Trudy (disambiguation) =

Trudy is a feminine given name.

Trudy may also refer to:

- Trudy (comic strip), an American comic strip by Jerry Marcus
- Trudy (gorilla) (1957–2019), considered the oldest living gorilla, held in Little Rock, Arkansas, U.S.
- The Trudy, an English post-punk band
- 22900 Trudie, an asteroid
- "Trudy", a song by the Charlie Daniels Band from Fire on the Mountain (1974)
