= Richilde =

Richilde or Richilda may refer to:

- Richilde of Provence (ca. 845–910)
- Richilde, Countess of Hainaut (ca. 1031–1086)
- Richeza of Poland, Queen of Castile (ca. 1140 – 1185)
- Richilde (fairy tale), an 18th-century short story by Johann Karl August Musäus
- Richardis (ca. 840–896), Holy Roman Empress
