= Gerbrand Bakker =

Gerbrand Bakker may refer to:

- Gerbrand Bakker (physician) (1771–1828), Dutch physician and professor
- Gerbrand Bakker (novelist) (born 1962), Dutch writer
