= Mme Sicard =

French composer

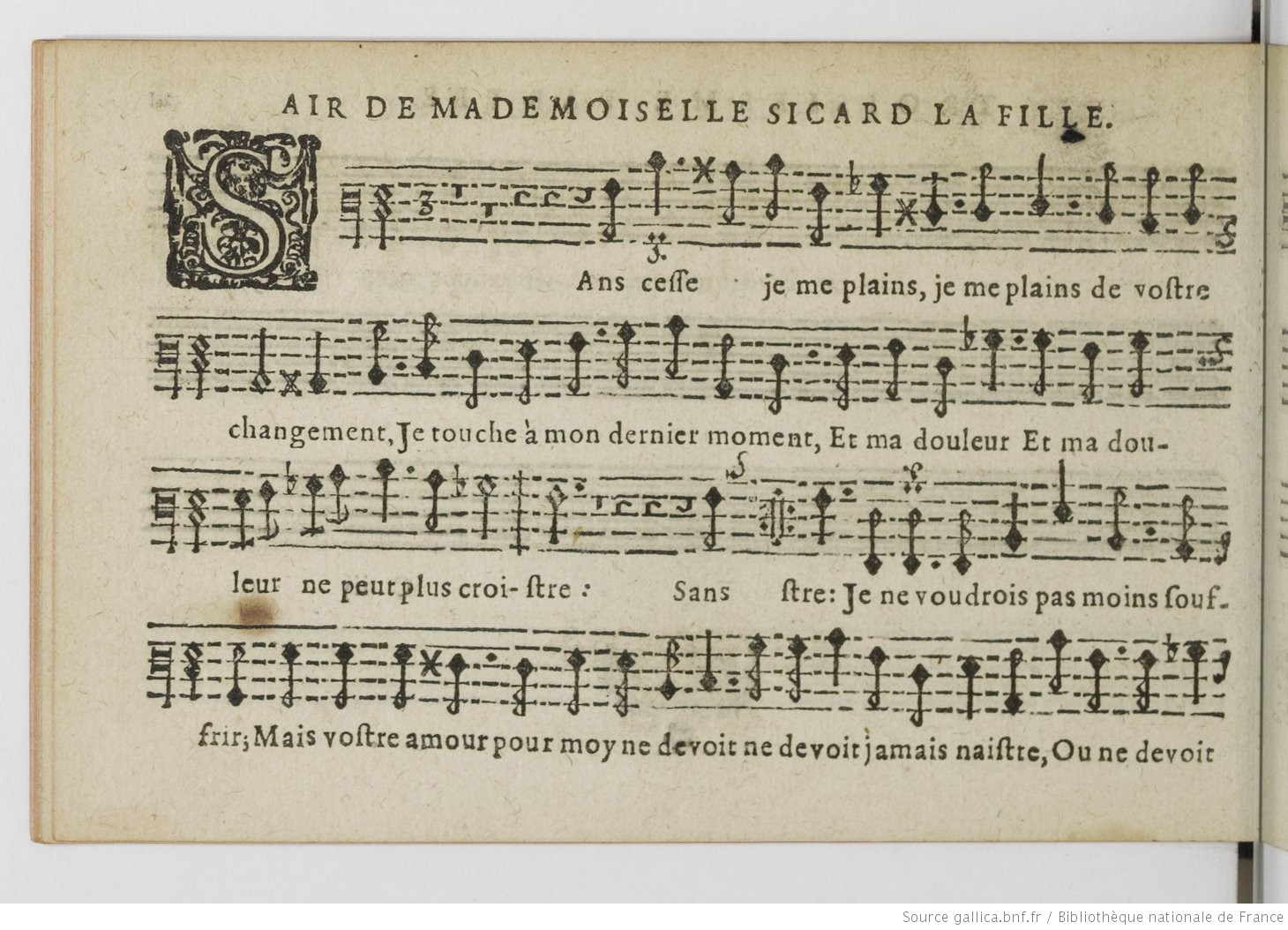

Mlle Sicard (first name unknown, fl. 1678) was a French composer, credited as the first published woman composer of her country.

She was the daughter and pupil of Jean Sicard. Jean Sicard dedicated his 12th book to her, and she wrote airs for three of his publications, including one in the 12th book, three in the 13th, and one each in the 14th and 16th.

She is credited as the first published woman composer in France, followed closely by Mlle Michon and the renowned Elisabeth Jacquet de La Guerre.
