= Leofric =

Leofric is an Old English name meaning "Friendly Kingdom", composed of "Leof" meaning friendly or desirable, and "ric" meaning kingdom or governmental state. The name may refer to:

- Leofric (bishop) (1016–1072), English religious leader
- Leofric (fl. 1070) (fl. 1070), English writer
- Leofric, Earl of Mercia (968–1057), English noble and benefactor of churches

== As a middle name ==
- Harold Rupert Leofric George Alexander, 1st Earl Alexander of Tunis (1891–1969), British Army officer and veteran of both world wars
