= Wolfgang (disambiguation) =

Wolfgang is a German male given name.

Wolfgang may also refer to:

== People ==
- Walter Wolfgang (1923–2019), German-born British socialist and peace activist
- Wolfgang (wrestler) (born 1986), Barry Young, Scottish wrestler with stage name "Wolfgang"
- Wolfgang Amadeus Mozart (1756-1791), prolific and influential composer of classical music

== Places ==
- St. Wolfgang im Salzkammergut, a market town in central Austria
- Sankt Wolfgang, a municipality in the district of Erding in Bavaria, Germany
- Wolfgang Pass, Switzerland
- Wolfgangsee, a lake in Austria

== Music ==
- Wolfgang (band), a Filipino heavy metal band
  - Wolfgang (album), 1995 studio album from the Filipino band
- "Wolfgang" (song), a song by South Korean boy band Stray Kids
- Wolf Gang, a British rock band
- Odd Future, also known as Odd Future Wolf Gang Kill Them All, an American music collective from Los Angeles

== Film ==
- Wolfgang (2021 film), a documentary about chef Wolfgang Puck
- Wolfgang (2025 film), a Spanish comedy-drama film

== Brands and enterprises ==
- Peavey EVH Wolfgang, a guitar series
- Wolfgang's Steakhouse, a steakhouse originating in Manhattan, New York

== See also ==
- Farkas
- Sankt Wolfgang (disambiguation)
