= Alduin =

Alduin or Aldoin may refer to:

- Alduin or Audoin (died 563/5), King of the Lombards from 546 to 560
- Alduin I of Angoulême (died 916), Count of Angoulême from 886
- Alduin II of Angoulême (died 1032), Count of Angoulême
- Aldoin (bishop of Cefalù) (died 1248)
- Alduin (dragon), the antagonist in The Elder Scrolls V: Skyrim

== See also ==
- Aldwin (disambiguation)
- Hilduin (disambiguation)
- Anduin
