= Sedrick =

Sedrick is a given name. Notable people with the given name include:

- Sedrick Barefield (born 1996), American basketball player
- Sedrick Curry (born 1976), American football player
- Sedrick Denson (born 1987), American politician
- Sedrick Ellis (born 1985), American football player
- Sedrick Hodge (born 1978), American football player
- Sedrick Huckaby (born 1975), American artist
- Sedrick Irvin (born 1978), American football player
- Sedrick Kalombo (born 1995), Italian footballer
- Sedrick Shaw (born 1973), American football player
- Sedrick Van Pran-Granger (born 2001), American football player
