= Sten (name) =

Male given name

Sten is a Scandinavian male given name. Literally meaning "stone" (to which surnames are anglicized to), it derives from a literal translation of Peter into the North Germanic languages.

Notable individuals with the name include

- Sten Abel (1872–1942), Norwegian sailor
- Sten Andersson (1923–2006), Swedish politician
- Sten Ask (born 1943), Swedish diplomat
- Sten-Erik Anderson (born 1991), Estonian rower
- Sten Bergman (1895–1975), Swedish zoologist
- Sten De Geer (1886–1933), Swedish geographer and geomorphologist
- Sten Ekberg (born 1964), Swedish decathlon athlete
- Sten Elfström (1942–2024), Swedish actor
- Sten Esna (born 1982), Estonian volleyball player and coach
- Sten Forshufvud (1903–1985), Swedish dentist, physician, and toxicologist
- Sten Fransson (1934–2012), Swedish murderer
- Sten Grillner (born 1941), Swedish neurophysiologist
- Sten Grytebust (born 1989), Norwegian footballer
- Sten Heckscher (born 1942), Swedish politician
- Sten Lassmann (born 1982), Estonian pianist
- Sten Lindroth (1914–1980), Swedish historian
- Sten Ljunggren (born 1938), Swedish actor
- Sten Lundin (1931–2016), Swedish motocross racer
- Sten Melin (born 1957), Swedish composer
- Sten Nadolny (born 1942), German novelist
- Sten Olmre (born 1995), Estonian basketball player
- Sten Pålsson (born 1945), Swedish footballer
- Sten Pentus (born 1981), Estonian racing driver
- Sten Priinits (born 1987), Estonian fencer
- Sten Reinkort (born 1998), Estonian footballer
- Sten Rudberg (1917–1996), Swedish geographer and geomorphologist
- Sten Rylander (born 1944), Swedish diplomat
- Sten Sokk (born 1989), Estonian basketball player
- Sten Stensen (born 1947), Norwegian speed skater
- Sten Strömholm (1930–1997), Swedish diplomat
- Sten Sture the Elder (1440–1503), Regent of Sweden
- Sten Sture the Younger (1493–1520), Regent of Sweden under the Kalmar Union
- Sten Jakob Viidas (born 2003), Estonian footballer
- Sten Swedlund (1937–2014), Swedish rear admiral
- Sten Wahlund (1901–1976), Swedish geneticist
- Sten Wåhlin (1914–1981), Swedish Army lieutenant general

In fiction:

- Sten (Breath of Fire 2 character)
- Sten, a Qunari warrior in BioWare's 2009 RPG Dragon Age: Origins
- Sten, a character in Allan Cole and Chris Bunch's series The Sten Chronicles
- Sten, a character in the anime Akame ga Kill!

Notable individuals with the family name Sten include

- Åge Sten Nilsen, member of Norwegian hard rock band Wig Wam
- Anna Sten, Ukrainian film actress
- Helge Sten, Norwegian musician
