= Wilmer =

Wilmer or Wilmers may refer to:

== Places ==
- Wilmer, Alabama, United States, an unincorporated community
- Wilmer, Louisiana, United States, an unincorporated hamlet
- Wilmer, Texas, United States, a city
- Wilmer, British Columbia, Canada, a settlement

== People ==
=== Given name ===
- Wilmer Aguirre (born 1983), Peruvian football player
- Wilmer Allison (1904–1977), American tennis player
- Wilmer Azuaje (born 1977), Venezuelan politician
- Wilmer L. Barrow (1903–1975), American electrical engineer
- Wílmer Cabrera (born 1967), Colombian football player
- Wilmer Calderon (born 1975), Puerto Rican-American actor
- Wilmer Carter (born 1941), California State Assemblywoman
- Wilmer Crisanto (born 1989), Honduran football player
- Wilmer Difo (born 1992), Dominican baseball player
- Wilmer D. Elfrink (1893–1948), American football and basketball coach
- Wilmer Fields (1922–2004), American baseball player
- Wilmer Clemont Fields (1922–2018), American Southern Baptist executive, newspaper editor, and author
- Wilmer Flores (born 1991), Venezuelan baseball player
- Wilmer Font (born 1990), Venezuelan baseball player
- Wilmer Angier Jennings (1910–1990), African American printmaker
- Wilmer Kousemaker (born 1985), Dutch footballer
- Wílmer López (born 1971), Costa Rican football player
- Wilmer McLean (1814–1882), grocer from Virginia, associated with the American Civil War
- Wilmer Mizell (1930–1999), American baseball player
- Wilmer Ruperti (born 1960), Venezuelan-born shipping business magnate
- Wilmer Skoog (born 1999), Swedish ice hockey player
- Wilmer Stultz (1900–1929), American pilot
- Wilmer W. Tanner (1909–2011), American zoologist
- Wilmer Valderrama (born 1980), American actor
- Wilmer Vásquez (born 1981), Venezuelan boxer
- Wilmer Velásquez (born 1972), Honduran football player
- Wilmer Cleveland Wells (1839–1933), Canadian rancher, lumberman and politician
- Wilmer Cave Wright (1868–1951), British-born American classical philologist

=== Surname ===
==== Wilmer ====
- Clive Wilmer (1945–2025), British poet
- Douglas Wilmer (1920–2016), English actor
- Elizabeth Wilmer, American mathematician
- Emmanuel Wilmer (died 2005), Haitian killed in political violence
- Franke Wilmer (born 1950), American politician
- Heiner Wilmer (born 1961), German Roman Catholic bishop
- James Jones Wilmer (1750–1814), Episcopal priest and U.S. Senate chaplain
- Richard Hooker Wilmer (1816–1900), Bishop of Alabama
- Val Wilmer (born 1941), British photographer and writer
- William Holland Wilmer (1782–1827), Episcopal priest, author and president of College of William and Mary

==== Wilmers ====
- Mary-Kay Wilmers (born 1938), British journal editor
- Robert G. Wilmers (1934–2017), American banker
- Wilhelm Wilmers (1817–1899), German Jesuit professor of philosophy and theology

== Other uses ==
- Wilmer Eye Institute, Johns Hopkins Hospital
- Wilmer Cook, a character in The Maltese Falcon and its film adaptations
- Candice Wilmer, a character in the Heroes graphic novels and television series

== See also ==
- Wilmer Cutler Pickering Hale and Dorr, a law firm
- Wilmer X, a Swedish rock band
