= German (given name) =

German (Russian: Герман) is a given name, often the Slavic form of Herman. For the Spanish given name pronounced with stress in the second syllable see Germán.

People with the name German include:

== Art and music ==
- German Galynin, Soviet Russian composer
- German Goldenshteyn, Romanian klezmer musician
- German Moreno, Filipino actor
- German Okunev, Soviet Russian composer

== Humanities and social sciences ==
- German Gref, Russian economist
- German Kim, Kazakhstani historian
- German Sadulaev, Chechen writer and lawyer

== Politics ==
- German Galushchenko (born 1973), Ukrainian lawyer and politician
- German Hacker (born 1968), German politician
- German Kuznetsov, former deputy premier of Kyrgyzstan

== Sport ==
- German Abdulaev, Russian judoka
- German Apukhtin, Soviet Russian footballer
- German Fernandez, American distance runner
- German Glessner, Argentine skeleton racer
- German Kutarba, Russian footballer
- German Lovchev, Russian footballer
- German Onugkha, Russian footballer
- German Ruano, Guatemalan footballer
- German Skurygin, Russian race walker
- German Titov (ice hockey), Russian ice hockey player

== Other ==
- Serbian Patriarch German I, Serbian Patriarch (1881–1888)
- Serbian Patriarch German, Serbian Patriarch (1958–1990)
- German Gardiner, English Catholic martyr
- German Sterligov, Russian businessman and environmentalist
- German Titov, Soviet Russian cosmonaut

== See also ==
- Germán
