= Aldwin =

Aldwin, Aldwyn or Aldwine may refer to:

- Aldwyn of Coln, abbot of Partney Abbey in during the 7th century
- Aldwine (died 737), bishop of Lichfield and Leicester
- Aldwin (prior), 11th century Anglo-Saxon prior, first prior of Durham monastery
- Aldwyn of Malvern, historical founder of Great Malvern Priory in the 11th century
- Aldwin Ferguson (1935–2008), Trinidad and Tobago footballer
- Aldwin Ware (fl. 1983–1988) American former basketball player
- Aldwin (Stargate), a character in the TV series Stargate SG-1

== See also ==
- Alduin (disambiguation)
