= AnduinOS =

- The desktop of AnduinOS 2.0.3 with the start menu opened
- Developer: Anduin Xue
- OS family: Linux (Unix-like)
- Working state: Current
- Source model: Open source
- Repository: github.com/Anduin2017/AnduinOS
- Official website: anduinos.com

AnduinOS is a free and open-source Windows-like Linux distribution, based on Ubuntu. It was created by Anduin Xue, a former software engineer at Microsoft.
