= Seaxburh =

Seaxburh or Sexburga is the name of the following Anglo-Saxon women:

- Seaxburh of Ely (died c. 699), queen consort of Kent, abbess and saint
- Seaxburh of Wessex (died c. 674), Queen of Wessex
