= Wigbert =

Wigbert or Wigbertus may refer to:

- Wihtberht (died 747), Anglo-Saxon missionary, first abbot of Fritzlar
- Guicpert, abbot of Farfa in 769–770
- Wigberht, bishop of Sherborne (c. 797–c. 820)
- Wigbert (bishop of Hildesheim) (died 908), bishop of Hildesheim
- Wigbert (bishop of Verden) (died 908), bishop of Verden
- Wicbert (died 962), founder of Gembloux Abbey
- Wigbert of Meissen (died before 976), margrave of Meissen
- Wickbert (died 1209), Livonian Swordbrother, murdered Wenno von Rohrbach

== See also ==
- Guibert
