= Eardwulf =

Eardwulf or Eardulf is an Anglo-Saxon male name. Notable people with the name include:

- Eardwulf of Northumbria, (floruit late 8th/early 9th century), ruler of Northumbria
- Eardwulf of Kent (floruit middle 8th century), ruler of Kent
- Eardwulf, Bishop of Dunwich (floruit middle 8th century), Bishop of Dunwich
- Eardwulf of Rochester (floruit middle 8th century), Bishop of Rochester
- Eardwulf of Lindisfarne (floruit late 9th century), Bishop of Lindisfarne

== See also ==
- Eadwulf
- Ealdwulf
