= Meinrad =

Male given name

Meinrad is a German male given name, which means "strong advisor", from the German words magan "mighty, strong" and rad "counsel". The name may refer to:

- Meinrad of Einsiedeln (797–861), German saint
- Meinrad I, Prince of Hohenzollern-Sigmaringen (1605–1681), German prince
- Meinrad II, Prince of Hohenzollern-Sigmaringen (1673–1715), German prince
- Meinrad Lienert (1865–1933), Swiss writer
- Meinrad Miltenberger (1924–1993), German sprint canoer
- Meinrad Schütter (1910–2006), Swiss composer
- Meinrad von Lauchert (1905–1987), German general
