= Sam Tchakalian =

American artist (1929-2004)

- Sam Tchakalian in his studio, circa 1960
- Born: 1929; Shanghai, China
- Died: January 21, 2004 (aged 74–75); San Francisco, California, U.S.
- Education: San Francisco City College (AA), San Francisco State University (BA, MFA)
- Occupations: Painter, educator

Sam Tchakalian (1929 – January 21, 2004) was an American contemporary abstract painter and educator of Armenian heritage. He was a noted contributor to the Northern California Abstract Expressionist movement, and his work focused on the paint's raw materiality, color relationships, and the physical act of painting.

== Early life and education ==
Sam Tchakalian was born in 1929, in Shanghai, China. In the early 1900s, Tchakalian’s Armenian parents fled the Ottoman Empire and migrated to China to escape the Turkish Massacre of the Armenian people. His mother died when he was young, and he was raised by his Chinese stepmother. His father operated a successful chain of French-style bakeries with his two brothers in Shanghai.

In 1947, the family was displaced by the Japanese Occupation during the Second Sino-Japanese War and the political turmoil that followed in China. Tchakalian, his stepmother, and his two brothers immigrated to San Francisco, when he was 18 years old. There, he enrolled at San Francisco City College and earned an Associate Degree in 1950. Later, he enrolled at San Francisco State College (SF State, now San Francisco State University), and received a Bachelor of Arts degree in psychology in 1952.

Upon graduating, he enlisted in the United States Army as an intelligence officer during the Korean War and was stationed in Washington, D.C. After his discharge from the military in 1952, he returned to SF State to study painting under the G.I. Bill and earned a Master of Fine Arts (M.F.A.) degree in 1958.

== Artistic practice ==
During his graduate studies in the late 1950s, Tchakalian created abstract paper collages with discrete color stains. After earning his MFA, he opened a studio on Duboce Avenue (San Francisco), where he spent the rest of his life. He began making highly textured works focused on the rugged, puckered, encrusted accretions of mulberry paper he drenched in paint. Reflecting on what he observed during the painting process and his deeper understanding of the paint's presence, he grew bolder, applying paint more heavily in ways that seemed to bridge the gap between painting and sculpture. By the 1960s, Tchakalian largely abandoned paper collage elements, replacing them with the physical exploration of the brush and liquid pigment, embracing "action painting" through rhythmic sweeps of gestures that evolved into a broad expansion of intense, vibrant colors seamlessly blended into bold, glyphic brushstrokes. This shift marked his progression towards classic San Francisco Bay Area Abstract Expressionism. Around 1968, Tchakalian moved from traditional brushwork to tools, most notably the squeegee. After pouring and rolling layers of different paint colors directly onto the surface, he dragged and spread the multicolored paint with a wide squeegee. His canvases also grew larger, some up to 20 feet long, and featured his squeegeed abstractions of long uninterrupted horizontal bands of marbled color many years before German artist Gerhard Richter popularized the technique. In the early 1990s, Tchakalian abandoned his squeegee technique in favor of trowels, knives, and heavy brushes. This transition let him load the canvas with dense paint, creating textured, thick, tactile traces of hand and tool motion, and leaving behind heavy underglows, ridges, and deliberate streaks. This thicker application allowed him to explore the tension between the weight of inert material and the color of light sheeting through heavy brush or knife strokes. Throughout his career, Tchakalian remained an unwavering abstract expressionist, creating works focused on paint's pure materiality. He applied paint with a fast, aggressive hand, producing expansive fields of light and color that could feel "sensuous and real," yet remain gentle through his careful handling of the pigment.

=== Art instruction ===
Teaching was central to Tchakalian’s artistic practice. He taught at California College of Arts and Crafts from 1962 to 1963, at the College of San Mateo in 1964, and most notably at the San Francisco Art Institute (SFAI) from 1964 until his retirement in 2004. He viewed painting as an open-ended process of self-exploration and discovery rather than a set of predetermined rules, and he brought that same approach to the classroom, rejecting traditional academic structures in the classroom as he did in the studio. Once, when a student asked him about the class curriculum, Tchakalian simply laughed, preferring to guide students individually through their own self-exploration. Known for his intense, profanity-laced critiques and a visceral approach to materials, his teaching style was described as "part Zen Master and part Drill Sergeant." Pushing his students to confront their own creativity and build psychological rigor, helping them dive aggressively into the physicality of the paint. His SFAI painting class critiques became events that were attended by anyone within earshot of the classroom, as student Robert Hyatt recalls, “This started with a small group and his critique about one painting; within the hour the room was packed to the door. Everybody was mesmerized by what he was saying, and when he was done, some students were speechless while others applauded.”

== Death ==
He died from complications from diabetes and leukemia on January 21, 2004, in San Francisco.

== Awards and honors ==
- 1975, 1981, 1989, National Endowment for the Arts (NEA) Fellowship Grants
- 1982, Maestro/Apprentice Program, presented by the California Arts Council
- 1981, Adaline Kent Award awarded by the San Francisco Art Institute
- 1961, 80th Annual Painting Award, awarded by the San Francisco Museum of Art
- 1961, 11th Annual Painting Award, awarded by the Richmond Art Center
- 1960, Winter Invitational Painting Award, presented by the California Palace of the Legion of Honor in San Francisco

== Public collections ==
- Buffalo AKG Art Museum, Buffalo, New York
- Art Institute of Chicago, Illinois
- Indianapolis Museum of Art, Indianapolis, Indiana
- San José Museum of Art, California
- San Francisco Museum of Modern Art, California.
- San Francisco International Airport, California
- Museum of Contemporary Art, Los Angeles
- Whitney Museum of American Art, New York City, New York
- Oakland Museum of California, California
- Worcester Art Museum, Worcester, Massachusetts
