= Thøger =

Thøger (and its variant Tøger) is a masculine given name which is mostly used in Denmark. It is the Danish version of the German masculine given name Theodgar which is a compound word: þjóð 'people' and gar 'spear'.

Notable people with the name include:

- Thøger Binneballe (1818–1900), Danish architect
- Thøger Birkeland (1922–2011), Danish teacher and writer
- Thøger Nordbø (1904–1994), Norwegian football player
- Tøger Seidenfaden (1957–2011), Danish journalist and political scientist,
- Thøger Thøgersen (1885–1947), Danish politician
