= Herleif =

Legendary Danish king

Herleif (Latinized as Herleifus) was one of the earliest legendary Danish kings according to Arngrímur Jónsson's Latin summary of the lost Skjöldunga saga. He was the son of Frodo I and the father of Havardus hinn handramme and Leifus hinn frekne. He supposedly "left behind many sons" but their names are not recorded and they seem to be excluded from the royal line of succession.

Originally, Herleif was named simply Leif (Leifus) after his grandfather, but later in life he became known as Herleif due to his courage in battle. Herleif derives from the Old Norse elements herr "army" and leifr "heir" or "descendant". During his reign, peace and tranquility were replaced by growing wars and banditry. The Skjöldunga saga does not record how he died. He was succeeded by his son Havardus.

== See also ==
- Fróði
- List of legendary kings of Denmark
- Danish monarchs' family tree

== Sources ==
- "Fragments of Danish History" by Clarence Miller.
- Jónsson, Arngrímur (2007). "English translation of Arngrímur Jónsson's paraphrase". ANQ. 20 (3): 3–33.
