= Eadwulf =

Eadwulf (sometimes Eadulf) is an Anglo-Saxon male name. Notable people with the name include:

- Eadwulf of Elmham (10th-century), bishop of Elmham
- Eadwulf of Hereford (died 830s), bishop of Hereford
- Eadwulf of Crediton (died 934), bishop of Crediton
- Eadwulf of Lindsey (died c. 937), bishop of Lindsey
- Eadwulf I of Northumbria (fl. 704–705), king of Northumbria
- Eadwulf I of Bamburgh (died 913), ruler of northern Northumbria
- Eadwulf Evil-child (fl. 970s), ruler of northern Northumbria
- Eadwulf Cudel (died 1020s), ruler of northern Northumbria
- Eadwulf IV of Bamburgh (died 1041), ruler of northern Northumbria
- Eadwulf Rus (fl. 1080), Northumbrian noble

== See also ==
- Ealdwulf
- Eardwulf
