= Frithuwold =

Frithuwold may refer to:

- Frithuwold of Surrey, 7th century King of Surrey
- Frithuwald of Bernicia, 6th century King of Bernicia
- Frithuwald, Bishop of Whithorn, 735–763x764
