= Roald (name) =

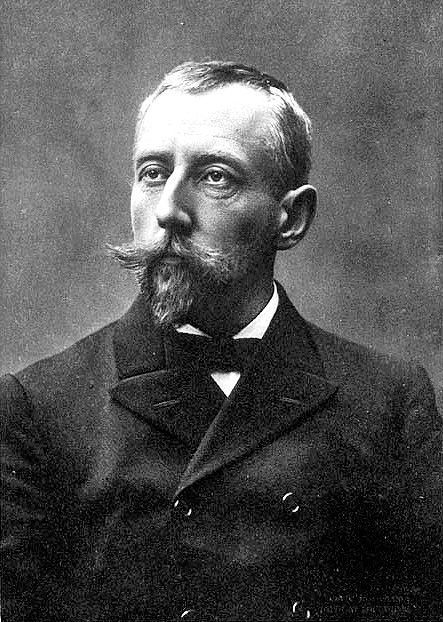
Roald Amundsen

Roald is a Norwegian given name. It is the modern form of the Old Norse name Hróðvaldr or Hróaldr, composed of the elements hróðr "fame" and valdr "ruler, leader". Persons named Roald include:

- Roald Aas (1928–2012), Norwegian Olympic speed skater and bicycle racer
- Roald Als (born 1948), Danish political cartoonist
- Roald Amundsen (1872–1928), Norwegian polar explorer
- Roald Amundsen (footballer) (1913–1985), Norwegian professional footballer
- Roald Åsmund Bye (1928–2003), Norwegian politician
- Roald Bradstock (born 1962), English Olympic javelin thrower
- Roald Dahl (1916–1990), British author and poet
- Roald Dysthe (1903–1997), Norwegian businessman and acquitted Nazi collaborator
- Roald G. Bergsaker (born 1942), Norwegian sports official and politician
- Roald H. Fryxell (1934–1974), American geologist and archaeologist
- Roald Halvorsen (1914–2010), Norwegian typographer, Communist Party politician, and World War II resistance member
- Roald Aga Haug (born 1972), Norwegian politician
- Roald Hoffmann (born 1937), American theoretical chemist
- Roald Jensen (1943–1987), Norwegian professional footballer
- Roald Larsen (1898–1959), Norwegian Olympic speed skater
- Roald (Løgmaður) (fl. 1450), First Minister of the Faroe Islands
- Roald Øyen (born 1940), Norwegian television personality and host
- Roald Poulsen (born 1950), Danish football manager
- Roald Sagdeev (born 1932), Russian physicist
- Roald Storsletten (1915–1991), Norwegian journalist and newspaper editor
- Roald van Hout (born 1988), Dutch professional footballer
- Roald van Noort (born 1960), Dutch Olympic water polo player
- Roald, a fictional penguin villager from the video game series Animal Crossing

Surname

- Arnfinn Severin Roald (1914–1983), Norwegian politician
