= Landon Parvin =

Republican speech writer

Landon Parvin (born 1948) is a Republican speech writer who has written for several U.S. politicians, including Presidents Ronald Reagan, George H. W. Bush, George W. Bush, and California Governor Arnold Schwarzenegger.

In 1982, while working for Ronald Reagan, Parvin also wrote for Reagan's wife Nancy. Nancy was being criticized in the press for her opulence. Parvin wrote a comedic song for her to the tune of "Second Hand Rose".

Parvin left the White House temporarily in 1985 to become executive assistant to the U.S. Ambassador to the U.K.

Parvin is responsible for writing a notorious joke for President George W. Bush's appearance at a press dinner that had Bush looking for the missing Iraqi weapons of mass destruction in various places, including underneath a desk table, while saying "Those weapons of mass destruction gotta be somewhere." Despite being reasonably well received at the time, it was judged by some to be insensitive to the families of the American soldiers whose family members in the service were in great danger overseas, and resulted in Bush receiving yet more criticism from a hostile press.

Interviewed in September 2004 about the Bush presidential campaign, he described his role in the campaign, "The purpose is for him to be better liked when he sits down than when he first stood up. That is what humor can do.".
