= Gerbrand =

Gerbrand may refer to:

- Gerbrand (da) (fl. c. 1022–1030), Bishop of the Diocese of Roskilde, in Denmark
- Gerbrand Adriaensz Bredero (1585–1618), Dutch writer
- Gerbrand van den Eeckhout (1621–1674), Dutch painter
- Gerbrand Bakker (1962), Dutch novelist
- Gerbrand Bakker (1771-1828), Dutch physician
