= Godric =

Godric may refer to:

== People ==
- Godric of Finchale (c. 1060–1170), Anglo-Saxon saint
- Godric of Mappestone (fl. 1086), Anglo-Saxon thane and landowner mentioned in the Domesday Book
- Godric the Sheriff (died 1066), 11th-century sheriff of Buckinghamshire and Berkshire
- Godric the Steward (died c. 1114) steward of Ralph de Gael
- Godric of Winchcombe, a medieval abbot of Winchcombe Abbey

== Fiction ==
- Godric, known as Godfrey, a character in the Southern Vampire Mysteries novels by Charlaine Harris
  - Godric (True Blood), a fictional character in the television series True Blood adapted from the Southern Vampire Mysteries novels
- Godric (novel), a 1981 Pulitzer-nominated book by Frederick Buechner about Godric of Finchale
- Godric Gryffindor, a fictional character in the Harry Potter universe
- Godric's Hollow, a fictional place in the Harry Potter universe
- Godrick the Golden, a fictional demigod in the videogame Elden Ring. Also referred to as 'Godrick the Grafted'.
