= Chilperic =

Chilperic (also Chilpéric or Chilperich) can refer to:

- Chilperic I, king of Neustria
- Chilperic II, king of the Franks
- Chilperic I of Burgundy
- Chilperic II of Burgundy
- Chilperic of Aquitaine, dies as an infant
- Chilpéric (operetta), an opéra bouffe by Hervé
