= Cwichelm =

Cwichelm is a masculine English given name. Notable people with the name include:

- Cwichelm of Wessex (died 636), Prince of Wessex
- Cwichhelm (bishop) (died after 678), Bishop of Rochester
