= Pandulf =

Pandulf (sometimes spelled Pandulph or Pandolph) may refer to:

- Pandulf of Pisa, 12th-century Italian cardinal
- Pandulf Verraccio (died 1226), papal legate to England and Bishop of Norwich
- Pandulf Ironhead (died 981)
- Pandulf II of Benevento (died 1014), also known as Pandulf the Old
- Pandulf II of Capua (died 983)
- Pandulf II of Salerno (died 983)
- Pandulf III of Benevento (died 1060)
- Pandulf IV of Benevento (died 1074)
- Pandulf IV of Capua (died 1050)
- Pandulf V of Capua (died after 1027)
- Pandulf VI of Capua (died 1057)

== See also ==
- Pandolfo (disambiguation), the Italian form of the name
