= Hildegund =

Saint Hildegund can refer to

- Hildegund (widow), c.1130 – 1178
- Hildegund (virgin), died 1188
