= Childebert =

Childebert was the name of several Frankish kings:

- Childebert I, king of Paris (r. 511–558)
- Childebert II, king of Austrasia (r. 575–595)
- Childebert the Adopted, king of Austrasia, known as Childebert III in France (r. 656–661)
- Childebert III, the Just, king of the Franks (r. 695–711), known as Childebert IV in France
