= Alaric =

Alaric is a masculine Germanic given name that, broken into its parts, means Ala "everyone's" and ric "ruler". This has various forms in the several Germanic languages, such as Alrekr in Old Norse. It is reconstructed as *Alareiks in Gothic, in which it is not attested directly. In modern German, the name normally takes the form Alarich; in the Scandinavian languages it takes the form Alarik; and in modern English its form is Alaric, an adaptation of the Latinization (Alaricus) of the Gothic one. There is also the alternative Latinization Alarichus from Greek Ἀλάριχος. In Italian, Galician, Portuguese, and Spanish it is Alarico.

== Kings ==
There were two Visigothic kings with this name:

- Alaric I, who reigned from 395–410, prominent for the Sack of Rome in 410
- Alaric II, who reigned from 485–507

There was also a legendary king of Sweden named Alaric.

== Others ==
- Alaric Basson (born 1996), South African swimmer
- Alaric B. Chapin (1848–1924), Union Army soldier who received the Medal of Honor for gallantry in the American Civil War
- Alaric Hall (born 1979), British medievalist
- Alaric Jacob (1909–1995), British journalist, most active in the period 1940–1960
- Alaric Jackson (born 1998), Canadian-American football player
- Alaric Jans (born 1949), American film and theater composer
- Alaric Rose (1909–1985), former Dean of Hong Kong
- Alaric Tay (born 1979), Singaporean director, producer and actor
- Alaric Tokpa (born 1958), politician in Liberia
- Alaric Alexander Watts (1797–1864), British poet and journalist
- Alaric Alfred Watts (1825–1901), British government clerk and writer
- Alarik Frithiof Holmgren (1831–1897), Swedish physician, physiologist, and professor
- Jayme Alaric de Perpignan (13th century), Frankish ambassador to the Mongol Empire
- Juan Pujol García (1912–10 October 1988), codenamed Alaric by Nazi Germany while working as a double-agent spy for Great Britain
- Leon Alaric Shafer (1866–1940), American artist

== Fictional characters ==
- Alaric, in the novels of Phyllis Eisenstein
- Alaric, antagonist of C. L. Moore's fantasy hero Jirel of Joiry
- Alaric Morgan, in the Deryni series of historical fantasy novels by Katherine Kurtz
- Alaric Saltzman, in The Vampire Diaries
- Alaric Stark, in the fantasy novel Fire & Blood written by George R. R. Martin
- Alaric Tudor, in the novel The Three Clerks by Anthony Trollope

== Other uses ==
- HMS Alaric (P441), a British Royal Navy submarine

== See also ==
- Alarico
- Eric
