= Pandolfo Malatesta =

Pandolfo Malatesta is the name of the following members of the Italian House of Malatesta:

- Pandolfo I Malatesta (c. 1267–1326), Italian condottiero and Lord of Rimini from 1317
- Pandolfo II Malatesta (1325–1373), Italian condottiero and son of Malatesta I Malatesta
- Pandolfo III Malatesta (c. 1369-1427), Italian condottiero and lord of Fano; father of Sigismondo Pandolfo
- Pandolphe de Malatesta (1390–1441), Italian archbishop
- Pandolfo IV Malatesta (1475-1534), Italian condottiero

== See also ==
- Sigismondo Pandolfo Malatesta (1417–1468), Italian nobleman and condottiero
