= Gundoald (name) =

Gundoald, Gundowald, Gundovald, Gondovald, or Gombald (French: Gombaud, Latin: Gunbaldus or Gomboldus) is a Germanic given name that may refer to:

- Gundovald, an Austrasian duke (Greg. of Tours, Hist., 4:47, 5:1)
- Gundovald, a count of Meaux (Greg. of Tours, Hist., 8:18)
- Gundoald, Merovingian usurper of the kingdom of Aquitaine in either 584 or 585
- Gundoald, Duke of Asti (c.565–616), Bavarian nobleman of the Agilolfing family
- Gundoald, Bishop of Meaux (died between 625 and 637)
- Gombald, Archbishop of Bordeaux (died after 998)
