= Diethelm Sack =

Diethelm Sack (born June 7, 1948, in Frankfurt am Main, Germany) is a member of the board of the Deutsche Bahn AG. He is responsible for finances and controlling.

Sack was an executive at Franz Garny AG from 1970 to 1976.

From 1976 to 1991, he worked as a controller at VDO Adolf Schinding AG.

In November 1991, he became a member of the board at Deutsche Bundesbahn and was assigned to the post of CFO and head controller. From March, 1993 he served in the same function at the board of Deutsche Reichsbahn (East Germany). When these government agencies became the privatised Deutsche Bahn AG, he kept his post.
