= Ermenfrid Penitential =

Ordinance composed by the Bishops of Normandy following the Battle of Hastings

The Ermenfrid Penitential is an ordinance composed by the Bishops of Normandy following the Battle of Hastings (1066) calling for atonement to be completed by the perpetrators of violence in William the Conqueror's invading army during the Norman Conquest of England. The date of issue is, probably, 1067. Some historians have dated it to 1070. Papal authority was given to the document by Ermenfrid of Sion, papal legate to Pope Alexander II (1063–1073).

== Penances ==
The ordinance is split into three distinct time periods, with corresponding penances described for homicides committed at the Battle of Hastings itself, those occurring in the intermediary period between it and William's coronation two months later on Christmas Day, and any acts of violence occurring after William was crowned. The decree issues penance on the victors alone. There are punishments attached to the motives of the soldiers, alongside the physical destruction caused by their weapons. If a soldier ‘had willed’ to kill but ‘had not actually struck a man’, then they had in-effect still sinned.

Additional clauses prescribe penance for further sins of the Conquest, chiefly adultery, rape, fornication and violation of church property. The code ends with an order that goods taken from English churches should be restored. Self-defence is recognised by the ordinance, which states a reduced penance. Penance could by undertaken by the invading army through alms: the donation of food and money to the poor, or through the construction of new churches.

There is no mention of Duke William of Normandy's role in the public penance, and it has been inferred that he was exempt from these charges. It has been suggested that the decision by Duke William to build an abbey at Battle was not made until after the ordinance was imposed. Therefore, the building of Battle Abbey may have been William's penance for his role in the slaughter at Hastings.

== Ermenfrid of Sion's life ==
As papal legate, Bishop Ermenfrid of Sion played a crucial role in conferring authority to the ordinance. Sion was the northernmost diocese in the province of Tarantaise, in the eleventh century Kingdom of Burgundy, occupying what is now Switzerland. Although "insignificant in itself," the Sion diocese "comprised a region which was of the greatest importance for communications over the western Alps", on a route which was "a principal means of communication from Italy, by way of lake Geneva and the Rhone valley, to north Burgundy and also to the Paris basin and the valley of the Seine," and thus "exceptionally well-placed for its bishop to know what was happening in the wider world.

Its situation tended to make him a figure of some importance for the purposes of popes and kings... [making him] a natural intermediary between the papacy and the regions of north-western France and England."

Little is known about Ermenfrid's life prior to the start of his bishopric in either 1054 or 1055 due to a lack of surviving sources from the time period. The death of his predecessor, Aimo, cannot be dated exactly and it is uncertain who promoted Ermenfrid to his office. It is apparent that he occupied his see in Sion for more than 30 years, a period in which he presided over several Councils in his capacity as papal legate to Pope Alexander II (1061–1073).

== The Ermenfrid Penitential ==
The text of the ordinance was preserved in a manuscript at Worcester, which was later printed by the English antiquarian Henry Spelman (c. 1562–1641) Regarding authenticity, analyses by medieval historian and Anglican priest H. E. J. Cowdrey concluded that "when it is compared with other evidence for the penitential system of the early Middle Ages and especially of its own century, the Norman penitential ordinance has the stamp of authenticity. There is no good reason for doubting either that the Norman bishops of the time would have enacted it, or that a papal legate such as Ermenfrid of Sion would have confirmed it on behalf of the papacy. It may be accepted with confidence as an authentic document."

=== At the Battle of Hastings ===
- Anyone who knew that he had killed a man was to do one year's penance for each man whom he had killed.
- Anyone who had wounded a man, but did not know whether or not he had killed him, was to do forty days' penance for each man whom he could remember.
- Anyone who did not know how many men he had killed or wounded was, at the discretion of his bishop, to do penance for one day a week during the rest of his life, or, if he could, he might redeem his sin by perpetual alms.
- Anyone who had not actually struck a man, but, nonetheless, had willed to do so, was to do three days' penance.
- Archers who had killed or wounded others, but who, by the nature of their weapons, could not know the number, were to do penance for three Lents.
- Clerks and monks who had fought or carried arms were to be dealt with according to the canons of the Church or their rule, as though they had sinned in their own land (s).
- Those who were prompted merely by personal gain owed the full penance which was appropriate for common homicide.
- Those who fought as in a public war were assigned a penance of three years by the bishops, out of mercy.

=== Between the Battle of Hastings on 14 October 1066 and the King's coronation on Christmas Day 1066 ===
- Those who killed men in face of resistance while they were foraging for food were to do a year's penance for each man; that is, they were to be treated as though they had killed men in the battle of Hastings.
- If, however, they were out for plunder and not for food, they were to do three years' penance for each man.

=== After the King's coronation ===
- Those who killed men must do the full penance for common homicide wilfully committed, but with the exception that, if the man who was killed or wounded was in arms against the king, the penance was to be the reduced one of those who had actually killed or wounded men in the battle of Hastings.
- Those who committed adulteries, rapes and fornications were to do penance as if they had sinned in their own country.
- The violation of churches was treated likewise, and those who stole from churches were to make such restitution as they could. Trafficking in the spoils of churches was prohibited.

== Similar sources ==
The authenticity of the source can be verified as it is in accordance with similar penitential orders. For example, by the ninth century, penitential books and decrees were fairly widespread across Northern Europe. The Ermenfrid Penitential is interesting in its rarity, as few sources survive relating to atrocities committed in a single and specific battle.

Following the Battle of Soissons (923) a decree was issued a year later, proscribing penance for those on both sides of the conflict. It therefore stands out as a comparatively rare example of impartiality, and mere presence at the battle warranted penitential activity. It has been suggested by Draper that the Ermenfrid Penitential lacks such impartiality as it was felt that the miseries of the defeated Saxons were great enough without the added imposition of penance.

Those who fought at the Battle of Soissons were to conduct their penance during Lent for three successive years.

The first surviving piece of evidence for rethinking the nature of homicide can be found in a letter sent by Pope Alexander II to the clergy of Volturno in 1063. The letter addresses volunteers taking up arms in Spain against the Muslims.

The Epistolae pontificum Romanorum ineditae, Letter of Pope Alexander II to the clergy of Volturno (1063):

"To the clergy of Volturno. We urge with paternal charity that those who are determined to set out for Spain think with maximum care about what they, divinely inspired, have decided to carry out. Let a measure of penance be imposed on each and every one of them who shall confess, according to the quality of his sins, to his bishop or spiritual father, so that the devil may not accuse them of impenitence. We, accompanying [them] with prayer, by the authority of the holy apostles Peter and Paul, [thereby] lift their penance and give them remission of sins."

The Letter appears to decree that the very act of arduous armed struggle would itself become the penitential sacrifice, and thus means of penitential behavior as described in the Ermenfrid Penitential would not be necessary. This theory was a powerful one in the Crusades whereby divine devotion militarized large swathes of Europe into battle.

Crucially, this source addresses the fighting between two different religions: Christianity and Islam. Slaughter of Christian peoples by fellow Christians, was clearly more problematic, as attested by the penitential ordinance of 1070.

== Context ==
At William's request, Pope Alexander sent his three legates: Ermenfrid, Peter and John to England with the task of reforming the English clergy. Despite this, the decree precedes the Gregorian Reform movement of Pope Gregory VII and his papal curia and the seismic debates that followed regarding plurality as well as other supposed ills and corruption of the Church. It sets the precedent of ecclesiastical intervention into State affairs, later to be disputed in the Investiture Controversy.

The Norman Conquest had been fought under the Papal Banner of Pope Alexander II, giving William legitimacy in his invasion. In addition to this, William claimed that he had a legitimate claim to the English throne, professing that Edward the Confessor had appointed William as his heir, but had been betrayed by Harold Godwinson. There was no system of primogeniture in royal dynasties at this time, and thus there were often several claimants to the throne.

== Language and style ==
The source is written in the imperative. It clearly lays out the requirements for every soldier who harmed or killed in battle and the penance owed to the sin committed. The three time periods into which the source is categorised creates the impression of, ‘circumstantial reliability.’

The ordinance reflects the stern discipline that William himself subjected to his forces and with the added, ‘zeal for disciplinary legislation,’ which was reflective of the Anglo-Saxon Church at this time.

== The Church and the nature of war ==
Theological debates in the Church regarding the nature of war and the act of sinning itself had been taking place for millennia. Burchard of Worms was influential in adding weight to the notion that any murder was sinful, regardless of the authority which directed it — a school of thought that lasted up until the First Crusade (1096–1099).

The Peace and Truce of God movement followed. The source may be interpreted as an attempt to limit infighting within Christendom, or an attempt by William to create a more unified kingdom.
