= Wilbert =

Wilbert may refer to:

- Wilbert, Minnesota, U.S., unincorporated community
- Wilbert, Archbishop of Cologne (died 889)
- Wilbert or Wigberht (8th–9th century), Bishop of Sherborne

== Given name ==
- Wilbert Awdry (1911– 1997), English clergyman, railway enthusiast, and children's author
- Wilbert Harrison (1929–1994), American singer and songwriter
- Wilbert Johnson or Wil Johnson (born 1965), English actor
- Wilbert Keon (1935–2019), Canadian physician
- Wilbert J. McKeachie (1921–2019), American psychologist
- Wilbert Montgomery (born 1954), American football player
- Wilbert Mubaiwa, Zimbabwean businessman and politician
- Wilbert Olinde (born 1955), American-German basketball player
- Wilbert Scott (1939–2025), American football player
- Wilbert Suvrijn (born 1962), Dutch international footballer

== Fictional characters ==
- Wilbert the Forest Engine, The Railway Series character with self-titled book

== See also ==
- Wilber (disambiguation)
