= Ealdwulf =

Ealdwulf is a male given name used by:

- Ealdwulf of East Anglia (r. c.663 – 713), King of the East Angles
- Ealdwulf of Sussex, King of Sussex in the early 8th century
- Aldwulf of Rochester, Bishop of Rochester from 727 to 736
- Ealdwulf of Lindsey, Bishop of Lindsey from 750 to 796
- Ealdwulf of Lichfield, Bishop of Lichfield in the early 9th century
- Ealdwulf (archbishop of York), Archbishop of York from 995–1002

== See also ==
- Eadwulf
- Eardwulf
- Ealdred
