= Sigeric (disambiguation) =

Sigeric was a Visigoth king for seven days in 415 AD.

Sigeric may also refer to:

- Sigeric, Burgundian prince, son of King Sigismund of Burgundy, died c. 523
- Sigeric of Essex, ruled 758-798
- Sigeric (bishop), Archbishop of Canterbury, died 994
