= Swithwulf =

Swithwulf is an Anglo-Saxon male name borne by several men:

- Swithwulf (bishop of London) (floruit 9th century)
- Swithwulf (bishop of Rochester) (floruit late 9th century)
