= Saint Hyglac =

Hyglac
- Residence: England

Hyglac was an eighth century Catholic saint from Anglo-Saxon England.

Very little is known of the life of this saint and he is known to history through the hagiography of the Secgan Manuscript. However, he is best known through a letter from an anchorite Alchfrid (also known as Alcheriðus). In the letter, Hyglac is a lector of an unknown monastery in Northumbria (possibly York). The letter, an exhortation to live a Godly Life, appears to be text borrowed from the different sermons of various priests. It is preserved in a collection of letters of Alcuin.

Hyglac was possibly a teacher of Aediluulf, and was possibly a student of Alcuin.

His name derives from the Old German word for Courage and the archaic suffix, -lac meaning to carry on an action, indicates he was Anglo Saxon.
