= Framboldus of Bayeux =

15th Bishop of Bayeux

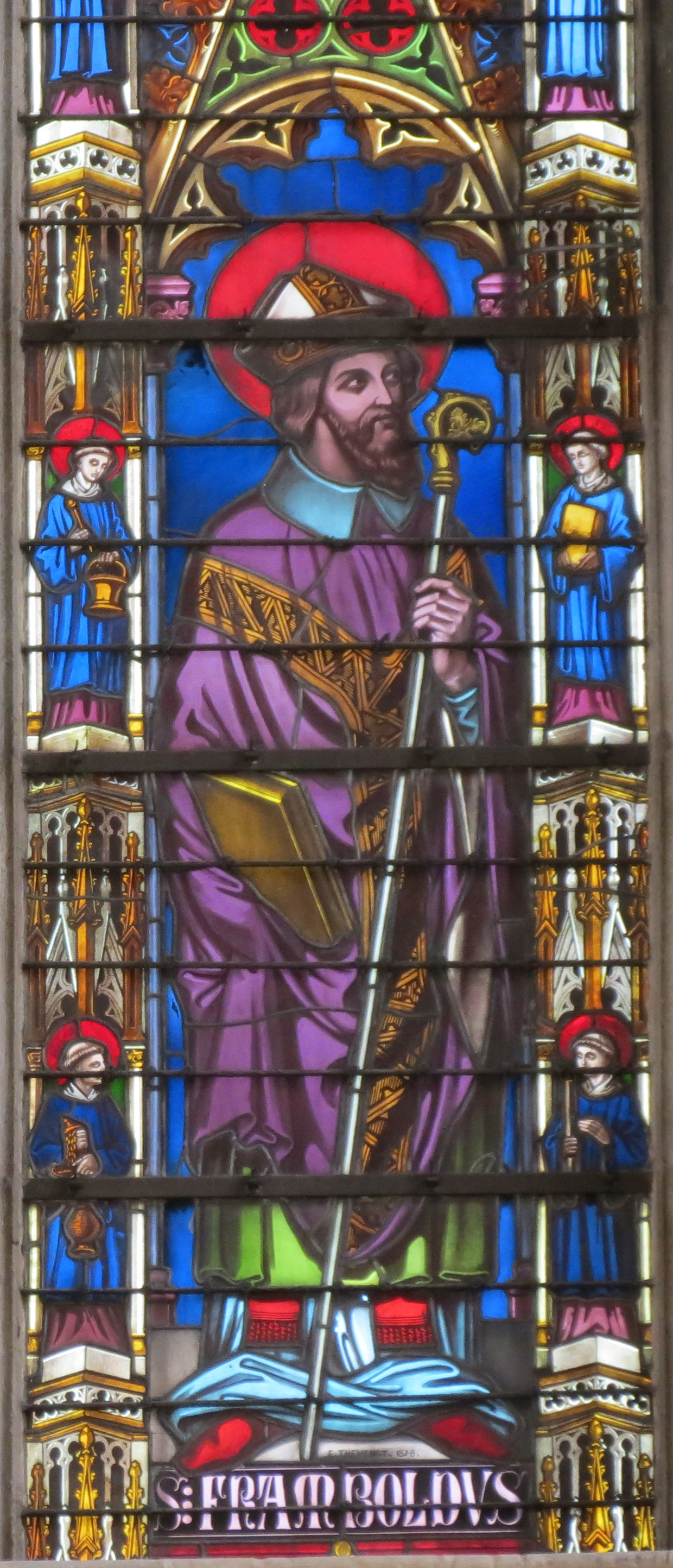
Framboldus of Bayeux.

Frambold (in Latin: Framboldus) or sometimes Franbolt, Frambaud, Franbourd was the fifteenth bishop of Bayeux around 691 to 720. The life of Saint Frambold remains mysterious. The place and date of his birth are unknown. Robert Cénalis, bishop of Avranches in the sixteenth century said of him only that "his holiness spread a lively radiance". He had been a monk and abbot of the diocese of Mans.

Frambold is represented on a stained glass window in the north transept of Notre-Dame de Bayeux cathedral, and in a painting on one of the vaults of the choir.

Frambold would most likely have been buried in the Saint-Exupère church in Bayeux alongside the first bishops of Bayeux.

== Controversy ==
There is no evidence for Frambold, or Framboldus, outside the 9th century episcopal list. Fisquet questions Framboldus' existence and Duchesne does not include Framboldus in his list of actual bishops.

== Legacy ==
Frambold is represented on a stained glass window in the north transept of Notre-Dame de Bayeux cathedral and in painting on one of the vaults of the choir.

He is remembered in the church at Manneville which was absorbed by Banneville-la-Campagne in 1828.

A feast day was celebrated locally on March 5 in his honor; this was, however, suppressed by the Concordat and there was an interruption in the cult of the saint, although the tradition remained alive. During the reform of the Bayeusian liturgy in 1860, the Holy See initially opposed the resumption of worship, but a decree of June 13, 1861 allowed the feast of Saint Frambold, to resume.

Framboldus' tomb was supposedly found in 1853, but there remained, and continue to remain, doubts about its authenticity and the identity of the bones it contained.
