= Cuthbert (given name) =

Cuthbert is a masculine given name. Notable people with the name include:

- Cuthbert of Canterbury (fl. 736–760), Archbishop of Canterbury
- Cuthbert of Lindisfarne
- Cuthbert (fl. 780/790), scribe and artist of the eponymous Cutbercht Gospels
- Cuthbert Bardsley (1901–1977), Anglican Bishop of Coventry
- Cuthbert Brodrick (1821–1905), British architect
- Cuthbert Bromley (1878–1915), English First World War officer and recipient of the Victoria Cross
- Cuthbert Burbage (1566–1636), a key figure in the construction of the Globe Theatre in London
- Cuthbert Burby (died 1607), London bookseller and publisher
- Cuthbert Burnup (1875–1960), English amateur cricketer and footballer
- Cuthbert Christy (1863–1932), British doctor and zoologist, author of the Christy Report
- Cuthbert Collingwood, 1st Baron Collingwood (1748–1810), Royal Navy vice admiral, one of the principal commanders of Battle of Trafalgar and Trafalgar Campaign
- Cuthbert Constable (c. 1680 – 1746), English physician and antiquary
- Cuthbert Dukes (1890–1977), English physician, pathologist and author
- Cuthbert Ellison (British Army officer) (1698–1785), British Army officer and Member of Parliament
- Cuthbert Ellison (Newcastle MP) (1783–1860), Member of Parliament
- Cuthbert Grant (1793–1854), Métis leader in what is now Canada
- Sir Cuthbert Headlam, 1st Baronet (1876–1964), British Conservative politician and several times Member of Parliament
- Cuthbert Hurd (1911–1996), American computer scientist and entrepreneur
- Cuthbert Mayne (1544–1577), English Roman Catholic priest and martyr
- Cuthbert Nyasango (born 1982), Zimbabwean long–distance runner
- Cuthbert Orde (1888–1968), British painter and First World War pilot
- Cuthbert Ormond Simpkins (born 1947), physician and historian
- Cuthbert Ormond Simpkins Sr. (1925–2019), dentist, Louisiana state legislator, and civil rights activist
- Cuthbert Ottaway (1850–1878), English footballer and cricketer
- Cuthbert Powell (1775–1849), U.S. Representative from Virginia
- Cuthbert Sebastian (1921–2017), Governor-General of St. Kitts and Nevis
- Cuthbert Sharp (1781–1849), English antiquary, official and soldier
- Cuthbert Tunstall (1474–1559), Bishop of Durham, diplomat, administrator and royal adviser
- Cuthbert Turner (1860–1930), English ecclesiastical historian and Biblical scholar
- Cuthbert Woodroffe (1918–2012), Anglican Archbishop of the West Indies

Fictional characters:

- Cuthbert (Microdeal), computer game character and the company mascot of the software company Microdeal
- Cuthbert Allgood, a character in Stephen King's Dark Tower series
- Cuthbert Binns, from the Harry Potter series by J. K. Rowling
- Cuthbert Calculus, a scientist in Adventures of Tintin
- Cuthbert Clare, a character in Thomas Hardy's Tess of the D'Urbervilles
- Cuthbert Cringeworthy, in the comic strip The Bash Street Kids
- Cuthbert Rumbold, from Are You Being Served?
- J. Cuthbert Banks, from P. G. Wodehouse's The Clicking of Cuthbert
- Grass snake Cuthbert, from the Lord Peter Wimsey short story Talboys by Dorothy L. Sayers
