= Walerand =

Walerand may refer to:

- Walerand Teutonicus, Lord Warden of the Cinque Ports in 1235
- Robert Walerand (died 1273), was justiciar of England
