= IJsbrand =

- Gender: Male
- Language: Old Dutch

Origin
- Meaning: "Iron sword" (Note: A popular misconception is that the name is a portmanteau of the modern Dutch words ijs and brandt, giving it the illogical implied meaning "ice burns")
- Region of origin: Netherlands

Other names
- Alternative spelling: IJsbrandt, IJsbrant, Ysbrand(t), Ysbrant, Eisbrand(t), Isbrand
- Related names: IJsbert, IJsbrecht, IJzerman

IJsbrand is a Dutch male given name of late Old Dutch or early Middle Dutch origins. The first syllable, "eis" (or ijs/ys), is derived from the old West Germanic word for iron. The second syllable, "brand" (or brandt), means fire but was traditionally also used as a kenning for sword. The NRC birth registry thus suggests the meaning "iron sword".

The name is at least as old as the 12th century, when it was a distinguished name for the Lords of Haarlem. The Old Dutch name *Īsbrant was also attested in a Latinized form before 1200. After it had caught on as a common given name, IJsbrand remained popular throughout Dutch history and up to the present day.

According to the figures of the Sociale Verzekeringsbank, the organization that implements national insurance schemes in the Netherlands, the year 2009 saw the name IJsbrand given to 4 newborn boys in The Netherlands; in the same year the alternative spelling Ysbrand had a count of 5. The Meertens Institute database of given names in the Netherlands reports a total of 1687 people with the spelling IJsbrand and 321 with the spelling Ysbrand as first or middle name, with other spellings occurring with 25 or fewer counts.

== Notable IJsbrands ==
- IJsbrand Chardon (1961-), Dutch equestrian
- IJsbrand van Diemerbroeck (1609–1674), Dutch physician and anatomist
- IJsbrand Godske (1626-1689), Governor of the Cape Colony (South Africa) from 1672 to 1676
- IJsbrand van Hamelsveld (1743–1812), Dutch head of state for two weeks in 1796 under the Batavian Republic.
