= Ubaldo Bellugi =

Italian poet (1899–1992)

Ubaldo Bellugi (1899–1992) was an Italian poet, fairytale writer, and playwright, and Podestà of Massa.

Bellugi was born in Borgo del Ponte, Massa. He was nominated Royal Commissioner and then, when he was just 28, he became the first Podestà of Massa, a position he held for fifteen years. In this capacity he proved true and unparalleled skills as an administrator, giving his beloved city a modern structure, with massive public works and innovations. Bellugi is also famous as a poet and a fairytale writer; he was the author of internationally popular children's fairy tales.
