= Imelda =

- Gender: Female

Origin
- Origin: Spanish/Italian
- Meaning: warrior woman, universal battle, or powerful fighter

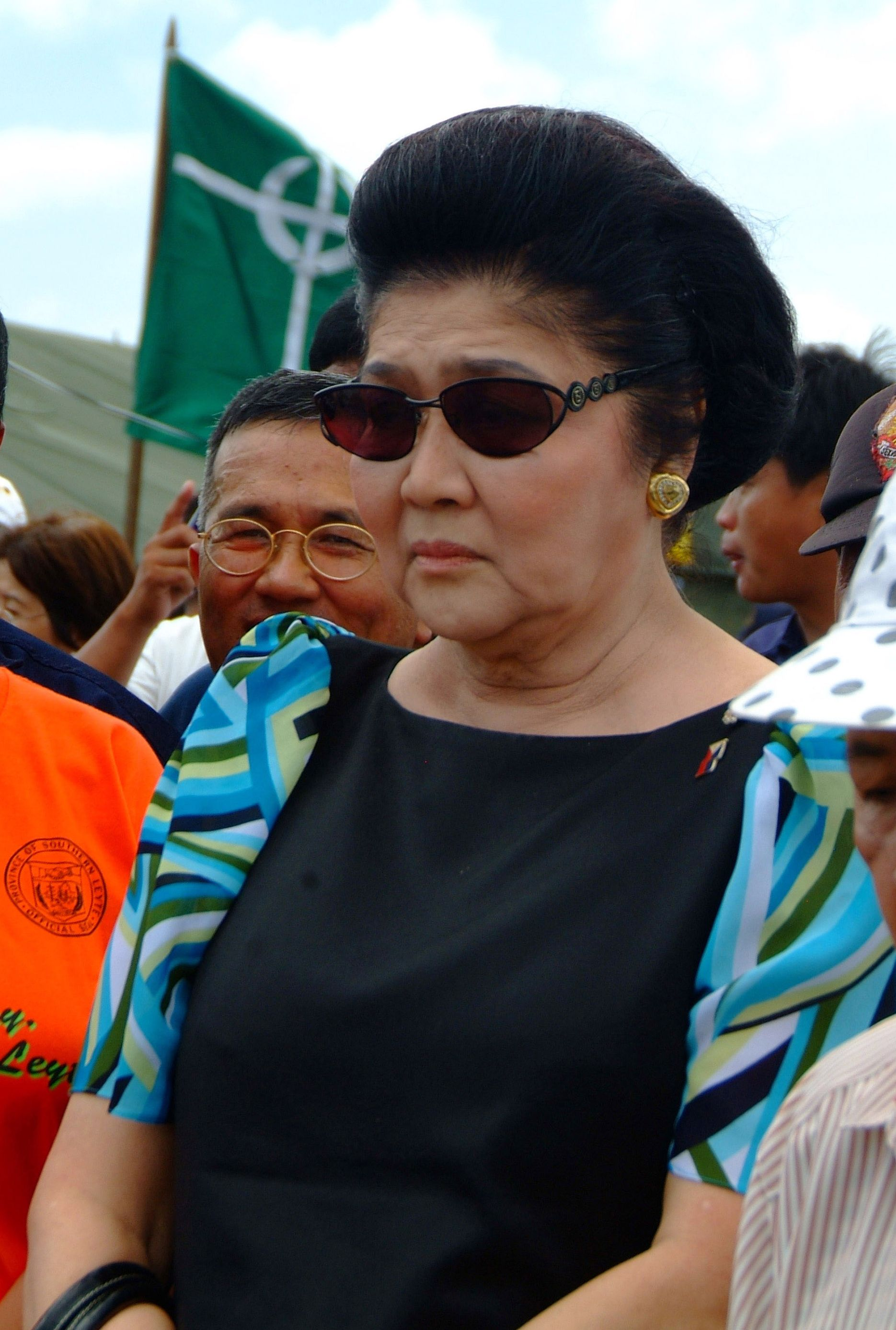
Imelda Marcos, wife of Ferdinand Marcos, a Philippine Dictator

Imelda is a feminine Spanish/Italian given name derived from the German form of Irmhild.

== People ==
Notable people with the name include:

- Imelda Bettinger, American photographer & tech professional
- Imelda Calixto-Rubiano, Filipina politician
- Imelda Chiappa, Italian road racing cyclist
- Imelda Concepcion, Filipina actress
- Imelda Corcoran, Australian actress
- Imelda Crawford, birth name of Anne Crawford, British actress
- Imelda Fransisca, Indonesian beauty queen
- Imelda Gruber, Italian luger
- Imelda Henry, Irish politician
- Imelda Hobbins, Irish camogie player
- Imelda Kennedy, Irish camogie player
- Imelda Lambertini, 14th-century Italy Dominican child saint
- Imelda Marcos, wife of Ferdinand Marcos and 10th First Lady of the Philippines
- Imelda Martínez, Mexican swimmer
- Imelda May, Irish singer
- Imelda Molokomme, feminist activist from Botswana
- Imelda Papin, Filipina singer
- Imelda Mary Read, known as Mel Read, British politician
- Imelda Roche, Australian businessperson
- Imelda Staunton, English actress and singer
- Imelda Therinne, Indonesian actress
- Imelda Wiguna, Indonesian badminton player

== Fictional characters ==
- Imelda de' Lambertazzi, main character in the tragic opera of that name
- Imelda Quirke, backing singer in Roddy Doyle's The Commitments and later in The Guts
- Imelda Rivera, main character in the 2017 animated film Coco
