= Sigmar (given name) =

Sigmar is a masculine given name, and may refer to:

- Sigmar Berg (born 1975), Austrian artist, photographer, and fashion designer
- Sigmar Bieber (born 1968), German footballer
- Sigmar Gabriel (born 1959), German politician
- Sigmar Polke (1941–2010), German painter and photographer
- Sigmar Vilhjálmsson (born 1977), Icelandic television personality
- Sigmar Wittig (born 1940), German academic
- Sigmar Guðmundsson (born 1969), Icelandic politician
- Sigmar Heldenhammer, a fictional character from Warhammer Fantasy Battles
