= Ealhmund =

Ealhmund is an Anglo-Saxon male name. Notable people with the name include:

- Saint Alchmund of Hexham (died 780 or 781)
- King Ealhmund of Kent (ruled in 784)
- Saint Alchmund of Derby (died c. 800)
- Bishop Ealhmund of Winchester (died between 805 and 814)
