= Holm Sigvald Morgenlien =

Norwegian politician

Holm Sigvald Morgenlien (1 March 1909 – 18 May 1995) was a Norwegian politician for the Labour Party.

He was a deputy representative to the Parliament of Norway from the constituency Akershus during the term 1950–1953. In total he met during 84 days of parliamentary session.
