= Sicard (given name) =

Sicard, Sicardo, Sicardus, Sichard or Sicart is a given name of Germanic origin. It may refer to:

- Sicard of Benevento (died 839), prince of Benevento
- Sichard of Farfa (died 842), abbot
- Sicard of Cremona (1155–1215), bishop of Cremona
- Bernart Sicart de Maruèjols (fl. 1230), troubadour
- Sicart de Figueiras (fl. 1290), Cathar bishop
- Sicard de Lordat (fl. 14th century), architect from the County of Foix
