= Sibrand =

Sibrand is a masculine German given name. Notable people with the given name include:

- Master Sibrand (1157–1191), German crusader
- Sibrand Lubbert (c. 1555–1625), German theologian
