= Günther (given name) =

Günther, Guenther, Ginther, Gunther, and the variants Günter, Guenter, Guenther, Ginter, and Gunter, are Germanic names derived from Gunthere, Gunthari, composed of *gunþiz "battle" (Old Norse gunnr) and heri, hari "army". Gunder and Gunnar are the North Germanic equivalents in Scandinavia.

Notable people with the given name include:

== Arts and entertainment ==
- Günter Bialas (1907–1995), German composer
- Günter Brus (1938–2024), Austrian painter, performance artist, graphic artist, experimental filmmaker, and writer
- Günter Bust (1930–2005), German music educator and composer
- Gunter Christmann (1936–2013), German-born Australian painter
- Gunter Demnig (born 1947), German artist
- Günter Eich (1907–1972), German lyricist, dramatist, and author
- Günter Fruhtrunk (1923–1982), German geometric abstract painter and printmaker
- Gunter Gabriel (1942–2017), German singer, musician, and composer
- Günter Grasmück, member of the Austrian band Opus
- Günter Grass (1927–2015), German novelist, poet, playwright, illustrator, graphic artist, and sculptor
- Günter Graulich (born 1926), German church musician and music publisher
- Gunter Hampel (1937–2026), German jazz multi-instrumentalist and composer
- Günter Haumer (born 1973), Austrian operatic baritone
- Günther Jauch (born 1956), German television presenter
- Günter Jena (1933–2026), German choral conductor and musicologist
- Günter Katzenberger (1937–2020), German musician, musicologist, conductor, professor, writer, and publisher
- Günter Kehr (1920–1989), German violinist, conductor, and academic teacher of violin and chamber music
- Günter Kochan (1930–2009), German composer
- Günter Krämer (born 1940), German stage director and theatre manager
- Günter Lamprecht (1930–2022), German actor
- Günter Lenz (1938–2026), German jazz bassist and composer
- Günter Ludwig (1931–2022), German pianist
- Günter Mack (1930–2007), German actor
- Günter Meisner (1926–1994), German film and television character actor
- Günter Müller (born 1954), German-born Swiss sound artist
- Günter Neubert (1936–2021), German composer and tonmeister
- Günter Neuhold (born 1947), Austrian conductor
- Günter Pfitzmann (1924–2003), German film actor
- Günter Pichler (born 1940), Austrian violinist, teacher, and conductor
- Günter Platzek (1930–1990), German keyboard player
- Günter Raphael (1903–1960), German composer
- Günter Reich (1921–1989), German-born Israeli baritone
- Günther Reindorff (1899–1974), Estonian-Soviet graphic designer
- Günter Reisch (1927–2014), German film director and screenwriter
- Günter Rimkus (1928–2015), German dramaturge
- Günter Rittner (1927–2020), German painter and illustrator
- Günter Rössler (1926–2012), German photographer
- Gunter Sachs (1932–2011), German photographer, author, student, industrialist, and astrologist
- Günther von Scheven (1908–1942), German sculptor
- Günther Schifter (1923–2008), Austrian radio presenter
- Gunter Schoß (born 1940), German voice and television actor
- Günter Schubert (1938–2008), German actor and voice actor
- Gunther Schuller (1925–2015), American musician
- Günter Schulz (born 1963), German musician, songwriter, and former member of the industrial band KMFDM
- Gunter Sieberth (born 1965), German oboist
- Günter Sommer (born 1943), German jazz drummer
- Günter Steinke (born 1956), German composer and teacher
- Günther Stoll (1924–1977), German actor
- Günter Strack (1929–1999), German film and television actor
- Günther Uecker (1930–2025), German painter, sculptor, and installation artist
- Günter Voglmayr (1968–2012), Austrian classical flutist
- Gunter Waldek (born 1953), Austrian composer, conductor, and music educator
- Günter Wand (1912–2002), German orchestra conductor and composer
- Günter Wewel (1934–2023), German operatic bass and television presenter

== Sports ==
- Günter Ambraß (born 1955), East German weightlifter
- Günter Anderl (1947–2015), Austrian figure skater
- Günter Bartusch (1943–1971), East German motorcycle road racer
- Günter Beier (born 1942), German gymnast
- Günter Benkö (born 1955), Austrian football (soccer) referee
- Günter Bergau (born 1939), German rower
- Günter Bernard (born 1939), German professional footballer
- Günter Böttcher (1954–2012), West German handball player
- Günter Bittengel (born 1966), Czech football (soccer) coach and former player
- Günter Breitzke (born 1967), German footballer
- Günter Bresnik (born 1961), Austrian tennis coach
- Gunter Brewer (born 1964), American football coach
- Günter Brocker (1925–2015), German footballer and later manager
- Günter Brümmer (1933–2020), West German slalom canoeist
- Günter Busarello (1960–1985), Austrian wrestler
- Günter Busch (1930–2006), German footballer
- Günter Burghard (1942–2022), Austrian ice hockey player
- Gunther Cunningham (1946–2019), American football coach for the Detroit Lions of the NFL
- Gunther Danne (1942–2025), German sport shooter
- Günter Deckert (Nordic combined) (1950–2005), East German Nordic combined skier
- Günter Deuble, West German slalom canoeist
- Günter Dohrow (1927–2008), German middle-distance runner
- Günter Dreibrodt (born 1951), East German handball player
- Günter Drews (born 1967), German footballer
- Günter Flauger (born 1936), German skier
- Günter Friesenbichler (born 1979), Austrian footballer
- Günter Fronzeck (born 1937), German footballer
- Günter Grosswig, East German slalom canoeist
- Günter Güttler (born 1961), German footballer and manager
- Günter Habig (born 1964), German footballer
- Günter Haritz (1948–2025), West German road and track cyclist
- Günter Havenstein (1928–2008), German long-distance runner
- Günter Heine (1919–?), German water polo player
- Günter Hermann (born 1960), German footballer
- Günter Heßelmann (1925–2010), German middle-distance runner
- Günter Hirschmann (1935–2023), German footballer
- Günter Hoge (1940–2017), German footballer
- Günter Holzvoigt, East German sprint canoeist
- Günter Jäger (born 1935), German footballer
- Günter Jochems (1928–1991), German professional ice hockey player
- Günter Kaltenbrunner (born 1943), Austrian former footballer and manager
- Günther Kaschlun (1935–2020), West German rower
- Günter Kaslowski (1934–2001), German cyclist
- Günter Keute (born 1955), German footballer
- Günter Kilian (1950–2026), German water polo player
- Günter Kirchner, West German slalom canoeist
- Günter Klass (1936–1967), German racing driver
- Günter Konzack (1930–2008), East German footballer
- Günter Koren (born 1962), Austrian ice hockey player
- Günter Kowalewski (born 1943), German wrestler
- Günter Krammer, West German sprint canoeist
- Günter Krispel (born 1951), Austrian bobsledder
- Günter Krivec (born 1942), German athlete
- Günter Kronsteiner (born 1953), Austrian footballer
- Günter Kubisch (1939–2005), East German footballer
- Günter Kutowski (born 1965), German professional footballer
- Günter Lobing, German lightweight rower
- Günter Lörke (born 1935), German cyclist
- Günter Lyhs (1934–2025), German gymnast
- Günter Malcher (born 1934), German athlete
- Günter Mielke (1942–2010), West German long-distance runner
- Günter Nachtigall (born 1930), German gymnast
- Günter Netzer (born 1944), German footballer
- Günter Neuburger (born 1954), West German bobsledder
- Günter Nowatzki, German sprint canoeist
- Günter Oberhuber (1954–2021), Austrian ice hockey player
- Günter Orschel (born 1956), Bulgarian equestrian
- Günter Petersmann (1941–2024), German rower
- Günter Preuß (born 1936), German footballer
- Günter Pröpper (born 1941), German professional footballer
- Gunter Rodríguez (born 1981), Cuban swimmer
- Günter Sawitzki (1932–2020), German footballer
- Günter Schaumburg (born 1943), German athlete
- Günter Schießwald (born 1973), Austrian footballer
- Günter Schlierkamp (born 1970), German professional bodybuilder
- Günter Schlipper (born 1962), German footballer
- Günter Schliwka (1956–2023), German weightlifter
- Günter Schmid (1932–2005), German motorsport founder and principal
- Günter Schneider (born 1963), Swiss rower
- Günter Schroers (born 1939), German rower
- Günter Schröter (1927–2016), German footballer and coach
- Günther Schumacher (born 1949), German track and road cyclist
- Günter Sebert (born 1948), German former footballer and manager
- Günter Seibold (1936–2013), German footballer
- Günter Siegmund (1936–2020), East German boxer
- Günter Spies (born 1948), German gymnast
- Günter Spindler (born 1949), German wrestler
- Guenther Steiner (born 1965), former team principal of the Haas F1 Team
- Günter Stratmann (1931–2010), German fencer
- Gunter Thiebaut (born 1977), Belgian footballer
- Gunter Thielen (born 1942), German chief executive
- Günter Thorhauer (1931–2007), East German footballer
- Günter Tilch (born 1937), German speed skater
- Günter Tittes (born 1936), East German breaststroke swimmer
- Günter Traub (born 1939), German speed skater
- Gunter Trojovsky, West German slalom canoeist
- Günter Twiesselmann (1925–2025), German rower
- Günther Ulrich (born 1936), Austrian fencer
- Gunter Van Handenhoven (born 1978), Belgian footballer and team manager
- Gunter Vanderveeren (born 1970), Belgian tennis player
- Gunter Verjans (born 1973), Belgian footballer
- Günter Wienhold (1948–2021), German footballer
- Günter Wolf (born 1949), German water polo player
- Günter Zeitler, German handballer
- Günter Zöller (born 1948), German figure skating coach and former East German competitor

== In government and politics ==
- Gunther, semi-legendary king of Burgundy
- Gunther of Bohemia (955–1045), Bohemian hermit
- Gunther of Cologne (died 873), Roman Catholic archbishop of Cologne
- Günter Baum (born 1960), German politician and LGBT rights activist
- Günter Baumann (born 1947), German politician
- Günter Böhme (politician, born 1925) (1925–2006), German politician
- Günter Burghardt (born 1941), German lawyer and EU civil servant, EU ambassador to the United States 1999–2004
- Günter Deckert (1940–2022), German far-right political activist
- Günther Denzler (born 1946), German politician
- Günter Gaus (1929–2004), German political journalist, commentator, television interviewer, diplomat, and "government fixer"
- Günter Glende (1918–2004), East German party official
- Günter Guillaume (1927–1995), East German spy
- Gunter Hadwiger (1949–2021), Austrian politician
- Günter Henle (1899–1979), German politician, pianist, and music publisher
- Günther Krause (born 1953), German politician and businessman
- Günter Krings (born 1969), German lawyer and politician
- Günter Lach (1954–2021), German politician
- Günter Mittag (1926–1994), German politician
- Günter Nooke (born 1959), German politician and former civil rights activist
- Günther Oettinger (born 1953), German politician
- Gunter Pleuger (born 1941), German diplomat and politician
- Günter Rexrodt (1941–2004), German politician
- Günter Riesen (1892–1951), German Nazi politician
- Günter Schabowski (1929–2015), East German politician
- Günter Stempel (1908–1981), German politician and lawyer
- Günter Verheugen (born 1944), German politician
- Günter Vetter (1936–2022), Austrian stonemason and politician
- Günter Vogt (born 1961), Liechtenstein politician
- Günter von Drenkmann (1910–1974), German lawyer
- Günter Wächtershäuser (born 1938), German chemist turned patent lawyer

== Science and academics ==
- Günter Abel (born 1947), German philosopher and former professor
- Günter Altner (1936–2011), German interdisciplinary active scientist, biologist, Protestant theologian, ecologist, environmentalist, writer, and lecturer
- Günter Asser (1926–2015), German professor emeritus of logic and mathematics
- Günter Behnisch (1922–2010), German architect
- Günter Benser (1931–2025), German Marxist historian
- Günter Bentele (born 1948), German semiotician
- Günter Bischof (born 1953), Austrian-American historian and professor
- Günter Breithardt (born 1944), German physician, cardiologist, and emeritus professor
- Günter Burg (born 1941), German dermatologist
- Günter Dreyer (1943–2019), German Egyptologist
- Günter Dyhrenfurth (1886–1975), German-born, German and Swiss mountaineer, geologist, and Himalayan explorer
- Günter Faltin (born 1944), German economist and entrepreneur
- Gunter Faure, American geochemist
- Günter Grönbold (born 1943), German Indologist and Tibetologist
- Gunther von Hagens (born 1945), German anatomist, businessman and lecturer
- Günter Harder (1938–2025), German mathematician
- Günter Heimbeck (born 1946), German-Namibian professor of mathematics
- Günter Heyden (1921–2002), German professor of philosophy and a sociologist
- Günter Hirsch (born 1943), German legal scholar
- Günter Hotz (born 1931), German pioneer of computer science
- Günter Kleinen (born 1941), German musicologist and professor of musicology
- Gunther Köhler (1965–2025), German herpetologist
- Günter Gerhard Lange (1921–2008), German typographer, teacher, and type designer
- Guenter Lewy (1923–2026), American political historian
- Günter Lüling (1928–2014), German Protestant theologian, philological scholar, and pioneer in the study of early Islam
- Günter Lumer (1929–2005), German mathematician
- Gunter Malle (born 1960), German mathematician
- Günter Maschke (1943–2022), German political scientist
- Günter Mayer (1930–2010), German cultural academic and musicologist
- Günter Meißner (1936–2015), German art historian
- Günter Meyer (born 1946), German Geographer and Orientalist
- Günter Morge (1925–1984), German entomologist
- Günter Nimtz (born 1936), German physicist
- Günter Ollenschläger (born 1951), German physician, medical editor, and professor of internal medicine and clinical decision making
- Günter P. Wagner (born 1954), Austrian-born evolutionary biologist
- Günter Pilz (born 1945), Austrian mathematician and professor
- Günter Reimann (1904–2005), German-born economist and writer
- Günter Ropohl (1939–2017), German technology philosopher
- Günter Sauerbrey (1933–2003), German physicist, inventor of the quartz crystal microbalance
- Günter Schilder (born 1942), Dutch historian
- Günter Schmahl (1936–2018), German physicist, professor, and pioneer
- Gunter Schmidt (born 1938), German sexologist, psychotherapist, and social psychologist
- Günter Schmidt (arachnologist) (1926–2016), German arachnologist and author
- Günter Schmölders (1903–1991), German economist
- Gunter Schöbel (born 1959), German archaeologist and museum director
- Günter Tembrock (1918–2011), East German zoologist
- Günter Theißen (born 1962), German geneticist
- Günter Weigand (1924–2003), German economist, self-proclaimed social lawyer, and amateur prosecutor
- Günter Wendt (1923–2010), German-American mechanical engineer
- Günter Wirths (1911–2005), German chemist
- Günter Wyszecki (1925–1985), German-Canadian physicist
- Günter M. Ziegler (born 1963), German mathematician

== Business ==
- Günter Böckle (born 1949), German software engineer and project manager
- Günter Felke (1929–2005), German furniture manufacturer, numismatist, and patron of culture
- Günter Fronius (1907–2015), Austrian entrepreneur
- Günter Herlitz (1913–2010), German businessman
- Günter Herz (born 1940), German businessman
- Günter Mast (1927–2011), German businessman
- Gunter Pauli (born 1956), Belgian entrepreneur, economist, and author

== Military ==
- Günter Halm (1922–2017), German infantryman
- Günter Hessler (1909–1968), German naval officer
- Gunter Jahn (1910–1992), German U-boat commander
- Günter Kießling (1925–2009), German general
- Günther von Kluge (1882–1944), German field marshal during World War II
- Günter Kuhnke (1912–1990), German submarine commander
- Günther Lütjens (1889–1941), Kriegsmarine admiral
- Günter Luther (1922–1997), German admiral
- Günther Rall (1918–2009), German Luftwaffe pilot and third-ranking ace in history
- Günter Schwartzkopff (1898–1940), German World War II Luftwaffe officer considered the "father of the Stuka" dive bomber
- Günter Steinhausen (1917–1942), German aviator
- Günther Tamaschke (1896–1959), German Nazi SS concentration camp commandant
- Günter Voigt (born 1933), German military scientist and major general
- Günter Vollmer (1917–2004), Nazi Germany officer
- Günter Weiler (born 1951), German army officer and lieutenant general

== Writing ==
- Gunter d'Alquen (1910–1998), German journalist, propagandist, and author
- Günter de Bruyn (1926–2020), German author
- Günter Herburger (1932–2018), German writer
- Günter Kunert (1929–2019), German writer
- Günter Ruch (1956–2010), German writer, journalist, politician, and author
- Gunter Segers, Belgian children’s book author, non-fiction book author, graphic designer, and illustrator
- Gunter Silva Passuni (born 1977), Peruvian writer
- Günter Simon (born 1933), German journalist
- Günter Wallraff (born 1942), German writer and undercover journalist
- Günter Weitling (1935–2024), Danish Lutheran theologian, historian, and author

== Other fields ==
- Günter Hermann Ewen (1962–1999), German mass murderer
- Günter Hoffmann (disambiguation)
- Günter Krüger (disambiguation)
- Günter Litfin (1937–1961), German tailor
- Günter Lorenz (born 1964/1965), Austrian murderer
- Günter Neumann (disambiguation)
- Gunter Prus (died 1232), Polish Roman Catholic bishop
- Günter Stephan (disambiguation)

== Stage names ==
- Günther (singer) (born 1967), stage name of Swedish singer and musician Mats Söderlund
- Gunther (wrestler) (born 1987), Austrian professional wrestler, formerly under the ring name WALTER

== Fictional characters ==
- Gunther, king of the Burgundians in the Niebelungenlied
- Gunter (Adventure Time), a major antagonist in the animated TV series Adventure Time
- Gunter (Legends of Chima), a character in the animated TV series Legends of Chima
- Gunther, the manager of the Central Perk coffee house in NBC sitcom Friends
- Bernie Gunther, the protagonist of Philip Kerr's Berlin Noir novels

== See also ==
- Günther (disambiguation)
- Günther (surname)
- Ginter, a surname and given name
- Guntur (disambiguation)
- Hans-Günter, a list of people with the given name Hans-Günter, Hans Günter, Hans-Günther or Hans Günter
