= Günther (surname) =

Günther, Guenther, Ginther, Gunther, and the variants Günter, Guenter, Guenther, Ginter, and Gunter, are Germanic names derived from Gunthere, Gunthari, composed of *gunþiz "battle" (Old Norse gunnr) and heri, hari "army". Gunder and Gunnar are the North Germanic equivalents in Scandinavia.

Notable people with the surname include:

== In arts and entertainment ==
- Agnes Günther (1863–1911), German writer
- Archibald Clavering Gunter (1847–1907), British-American writer, playwright, and magazine publisher
- Cornell Gunter (1936–1990), American R&B singer, brother of Shirley Gunter
- Egon Günther (1927–2017), German film director and writer
- Egon Guenther (1921–2015), German–South African gallery owner, printmaker and photographer
- Gertrud Günther (1881–1944), German writer
- Johann Christian Günther (1695–1723), German poet
- John Gunther (1901–1970), American journalist and author
- Jyllian Gunther, American film director
- Kyle Gunther, lead vocalist for Michigan heavy metal band Battlecross
- Lee Gunther (1935–1998), American film editor
- Mike Gunther (born 1972), American film director and stuntman
- Matt Gunther (1963–1997), American actor and model
- Rafael Yela Günther (1888–1942), Guatemalan sculptor
- Sherry Gunther, American television producer
- Shirley Gunter (1934–2015), American R&B singer, sister of Cornell Gunter
- Ursula Günther (1927–2006), German musicologist

== In government and politics ==
- Ben T. Gunter (1865–1939), American politician from Virginia
- Ben T. Gunter Jr. (1902–1980), American politician from Virginia
- Bernhard Günther (1906–1981), German politician
- Bill Gunter (1934–2024), American politician from Florida
- Christian Günther (1886–1966), Swedish Foreign Minister
- Claës Günther (1799–1861), Swedish Prime Minister for Justice
- Daniel Günther (born 1973), German politician
- Georg Günther (born 1988), German politician
- George Gunther (1919–2012), American politician
- Joachim Günther (born 1948), German politician
- Kurt Günther (1896–1947), German politician
- Linda Hinkleman Gunter (born 1951), American politician from North Carolina
- Ray Gunter (1909–1977), British politician
- Robert Gunter (1831–1905), British army officer, property developer, and politician
- William Adams Gunter Jr. (1871–1940), American politician from Alabama

== In science and academics ==
- Albert Günther (1830–1914), British zoologist
- Christine Guenther, American mathematician
- Edmund Gunter, (1581–1626), English clergyman, mathematician, geometer, astronomer, and inventor
- Gordon Gunter (1909–1998), American marine biologist and fisheries scientist
- Gotthard Günther (1900–1984), German philosopher
- Hans F. K. Günther (1891–1968), Nazi racial theorist
- Herbert V. Günther (1917–2006), teacher, writer and scholar
- James Gunter (1745–1819), English confectioner, fruit grower, and scientific gardener
- Jen Gunter (born 1966), Canadian-American gynecologist and author
- Neil J. Gunther (born 1950), Australian-American scientist
- Robert Gunther (1869–1940), British science historian
- Sibylle Günter (born 1964), German theoretical physicist
- Siegmund Günther (1848–1923), German geographer and mathematician

== In sport ==
- Chris Gunter (born 1989), Welsh footballer
- Christian Günter (born 1993), German football player
- Dave Gunther (1937–2024), American basketball coach
- Dylan Guenther (born 2003), Canadian ice hockey player
- Ian Gunther (born 1999), American gymnastics creator
- Jasper Günther (born 1999), German basketballer
- Jeffrey Gunter (born 1999), American football player
- Koray Günter (born 1994), German football player
- Maximilian Günther (born 1997), German racing driver
- Per Günther (born 1988), German basketball player
- Phil Gunter (1932–2007), English footballer, brother of David Gunter
- Ron Guenther (born 1945), American athletic director

== In other fields ==
- Bernie Günther, fictional detective in novels by Philip Kerr
- Friedrich Christian Günther (1726–1774), Thuringian naturalist
- Henry Gunther (1895–1918), American soldier, the last Allied soldier killed during World War I
- Joe Gunther, fictional character in novels by Archer Mayor
- Matthew Alan Gunter (born 1957), American Episcopal bishop
- Wilhelm Günther (1899–1945), German SS general and police official during World War II

== See also ==
- Günther (given name)
- Ginter, a surname and given name
- Guntur (disambiguation)
