= Gunter =

Gunter is a given Germanic name and surname, a variation of Günther. For people with the name, see:

- Günther (given name)
- Günther (surname)

Gunter may also refer to:

== Places ==
- Gunter, Texas, United States, a city
  - Gunter Independent School District
- Gunter Creek, Missouri, United States
- Gunter Hotel, San Antonio, Texas, United States
- Gunter Mansion, Abergavenny, Monmouthshire, Wales
- Gunter Annex, Alabama, a United States Air Force installation
- the former German name of the village of Gintro, Poland
- Mount Gunter, Graham Land, Antarctica
- 1944 Günter, an asteroid

== Transportation ==
- Gunter rig, a type of sailing rig, especially in small boats
- RV Gordon Gunter, a fisheries research vessel

== Names ==
- Gunter baronets, an extinct title in the Baronetage of the United Kingdom

== See also ==
- Gunters Mountain, Alabama, United States
- Günther (disambiguation)
