= Wiegand =

Wiegand is a German surname. It originated from the Old High German verb wîgan, meaning to fight, through the past participle form wîgant, meaning the fighter. The word comes from wîg (battle/war). The name was in use by the Middle Ages, also as a first name.

Notable people with the name Wiegand or von Wiegand include:

- Auguste Wiegand (1849–1904), Belgian organist in Sydney, Australia
- Bernd Wiegand (born 1957), German politician
- Charmion Von Wiegand (1896–1983), American journalist and abstract artist
- Clyde Wiegand (1915–1996), American physicist
- Dave Wiegand (born 1974), American Scrabble player
- David Wiegand (1947–2018), American journalist and critic
- Ernest H. Wiegand (1886–1973), American scientist
- Frank Wiegand (born 1943), German Olympic medallist in swimming
- Heinrich Wiegand (1855–1909), head of Norddeutscher Lloyd
- Joe Wiegand (born 1965), portrayer of Theodore Roosevelt
- John R. Wiegand (1912–1986), German-born American physicist
- Karl Henry von Wiegand (1874–1961), German-born American journalist
- Karl McKay Wiegand (1873–1942), American botanist
- Klaus Wiegand (born 1941), German major general
- Krista E. Wiegand (born 1971), American political scientist
- Leander Wiegand (born 1999), German American football player
- Lisa Wiegand (born 1968), American cinematographer
- Matthias Wiegand (born 1954), East German cyclist
- Otto Oscar Wiegand (born 1860), American politician
- Sepp Wiegand (born 1991), German rally driver
- Sylvia Wiegand (born 1945), American mathematician
- Theodor Wiegand (1864–1936), German archaeologist
- Thomas Wiegand (born 1970), German electrical engineer
- Wayne A. Wiegand (born 1946), American library historian, author, and academic
- Wilhelm Wiegand (1851–1915), German archivist and historian
- William B. Wiegand (1889–1976), American carbon black scientist

== See also ==
- Weigand
- Weigandt
- Weygand
- Wigand (disambiguation)
