= Weigand =

Weigand is a German surname. Notable people with the surname include:

- Andrea Weigand (born 1977), Canadian lawn bowler
- Andreas Weigand (born 1945), American sprint canoeist
- Bill Weigand (1928–2021), Canadian politician
- Geoff Weigand (born 1964), Australian rock climber
- Günter Weigand (1924–2003), German economist
- Gustav Weigand (1860–1930), German linguist
- Peter Weigand (1941–2011), American sprint canoeist
- Rolf Weigand (born 1984), German politician
- Wilhelm Weigand (1862–1949), German poet and writer
- William Weigand (born 1937), American Roman Catholic bishop

== See also ==
- Wiegand
- Wigand
- Weygand
- Weigand of Redwitz
