= Günthner =

Günthner is a German-language surname. Notable people with this surname include:

- Elke Günthner (born 1964), German soccer referee
- Martin Günthner (born 1976), German politician

== See also ==
- Günther
- Güntner
