= Klaus Pohl =

Klaus Pohl is the name of:

- Klaus Pohl (actor) (1883–1958), Austrian actor
- Klaus Pohl (German actor) (born 1952), German stage and film actor, director and screenwriter, awarded with the Mülheimer Dramatikerpreis
- Klaus Pohl (wrestler) (born 1941), East German wrestler
- Klaus Pohl (computer scientist) (born 1960), German computer scientist
