= Güntner =

Güntner is a German-language surname. Notable people with this surname include:

- Andreas Güntner
- Michael Güntner
- Jan Güntner
- Bernhard Güntner
- Marian Antoni Güntner

== See also ==
- Günther
- Günthner
