= Weygand =

Weygand is a surname. Notable people with the surname include:

- Conrad Weygand (1890–1945), German chemist
- Maxime Weygand (1867–1965), French military commander
- Robert Weygand (born 1948), American politician
- Zina Weygand (born 1945), French historian

== See also ==
- Wiegand
- Weigand
- Weigandt
- Wigand (disambiguation)
