= Hans-Günter =

Hans-Günter or Hans-Günther are German masculine given names, composed of Hans and Günther, respectively. Notable people with this name include:

== People named Hans-Günter ==
- Hans-Günter Bruns (born 1954), German football player
- Hans-Günter Etterich (born 1951), German football player
- Hans-Günter Klein (1939–2016), German musicologist, librarian, art historian, and LGBT activist
- Hans-Günter Neues (1950–2016), German football player and coach
- Hans-Günter Ottenberg (born 1947), German musicologist and teacher
- Hans-Günter Richardi (1939–2025), German journalist and author

=== People named Hans Günter ===
- Hans Günter Nöcker (1927–2019), German operatic bass-baritone
- Hans Günter Winkler (1926–2018), German show jumper, winner of five Olympic gold medals

== People named Hans-Günther ==
- Hans-Günther Hilker (1932–2005), German water polo player
- Hans-Günther Plücken (born 1954), German football player
- Hans-Günther von Rost (1894–1945), German general during World War II.
- Hans-Günther Thalheim (1924–2018), German Germanist, writer and literary editor
- Hans-Günther Wauer (1925–2016), German church musician

=== People named Hans Günther ===
- Hans Günther Aach (1919–1999), German botanist
- Hans Günther Adler, known as H. G. Adler (1910–1988), Czech-English German-language poet and novelist, non-fiction writer, scholar, and Holocaust survivor
- Hans Günther von Dincklage (1896–1974), German officer and merchant, and a spy in France
- Hans Günther Kestler (1939–2013), German chess player, International Master (1976)
- Hans Günther Franz Otte, known as Hans Otte (1926–2007), German composer, pianist and radio promoter

== See also ==
- Hans Günther (disambiguation)
- Heinz-Günter
