= SS Günther =

A number of steamships have been named Günther, including:

- SS Günther (1906), a cargo ship in service 1907–1917
- SS Günther (1944), a Hansa A Type cargo ship in service 1944–45
