= Heinz-Günter =

Heinz-Günter or Heinz Günter is a German masculine compound given name which may refer to:

- Heinz-Günter Bargfrede (born 1942), German politician
- Heinz Günter Mebusch (1952–2001), German photographer and experimental artist
- Heinz-Günter Scheil (born 1962), German football manager and retired player
- Heinz-Günter Schenk (born 1942), German former triple jumper
- Heinz-Günter Wittmann (1927–1990), German biochemist

== See also ==
- Hans-Günter
