= Günter Neumann =

Günter Neumann may refer to:

- Günter Neumann (agricultural scientist) (born 1958), German agricultural scientist
- Günter Neumann (singer) (1913–1972), German singer, composer, lyricist and cabaretist
