= Teekampagne =

Teekampagne (German for 'Tea Campaign') is the largest mail order tea business in Germany and the world's largest importer of Darjeeling loose leaf tea. It is headquartered in Potsdam, Germany. Teekampagne runs a traceability program allowing to follow each single package to the tea garden where it comes from. This includes also documents of sampling, analysis, EGCG, certificate of origin and cargo inspections.

Teekampagne was founded in Berlin in 1985 by Günter Faltin, entrepreneur and professor of entrepreneurship at the Freie Universität Berlin. The company's business model saves costs on storage, transportation and packaging: it imports directly from India, limits itself to one product (Darjeeling tea), trades only organic teas, subjects that product to stringent tests for quality, and sells in large packages.

Teekampagne runs a reforestation plan in Darjeeling in cooperation with the WWF. The plan is funded solely by the Teekampagne, but the project is implemented by the WWF-India. The project is called SERVE and is intended as a long-term commitment. The program, started in 1992, aims to reverse the soil erosion on the steep slopes of Darjeeling by replanting trees in strategic locations. So far an area of 210 hectares has been reforested, 22 tree nurseries have been established and 260.000 seedlings were grown in the last year alone. An educational plan runs along with the reforestation program: 13 local schools are working closely with the WWF project; their activities include nature treks, bird watching, and various exhibitions and workshops. Research activities range from the recycling of plastics to the conservation of endangered bird species. Workshops on medicinal plants teach the local population how to benefit these natural resources. Plans in the near future are to reach an extension of 300 hectares of reforested land in the area of Senchal, which provides the town of Darjeeling with water.

The Teekampagne does business in Japan as Teeidee, in the United States as Boston Tea Campaign, and in New Zealand as Tea Campaign New Zealand.
