= Guenther House =

Guenther House may refer to:

- Richard Guenther House in Oshkosh, Wisconsin, National Register of Historic Places Listings 1984
- Guenther House (San Antonio, Texas) Museum, restaurant and house, National Register of Historic Places Listings in Bexar County, Texas 1990

== See also ==
- Gunther (disambiguation)
