= Günther =

Günther may refer to:

== People ==
- Günther (given name)
- Günther (surname)

== Places ==
- Gunther Island, in Humboldt Bay, California
- Guenther, Wisconsin, a town in Marathon County

== Other uses ==
- SS Günther (1944), a Hansa A Type cargo ship in service 1944–45
- Gunther Brewing Company, defunct American brewery, which originated as George Gunther, Jr. Brewing Company

== See also ==
- Guenther House (disambiguation)
- Gunter (disambiguation)
- Guntur (disambiguation)
