= Michael Gunder =

New Zealand urban planner (1954–2021)

Michael Gunder (1954 – 14 March 2021) was an associate professor in the School of Architecture and Planning at the University of Auckland, and was a past president of the New Zealand Planning Institute. He had a BA (Sociology), MA (Planning), both from the University of British Columbia (UBC) in Vancouver, and a PhD in Planning from the University of Auckland. In 2011 he was made a Fellow of the New Zealand Planning Institute. He was the managing editor of the academic journal Planning Theory.

Gunder spent fifteen years working as a professional planner in government and as a consultant, prior to becoming an academic in 1994. He worked in New Zealand, Canada, the UK, and the European Union. He was HOD of the Planning Department, University of Auckland, 1999–2001, and is the author of over 60 academic articles and monographs. His main areas of expertise include public policy review, economic development, transportation and strategic planning, and his recent academic research was focused on the application of poststructuralism and psychoanalytic theory towards the understanding of planning practice and public policy formulation.

Dr. Gunder died on March 14, 2021, at 67 years of age.
