= Wigand =

Wigand may refer to:

== Given name ==
- Saint Wigand, three people:
  - Venantius of Berri, 5th century
  - Venantius of Camerino, 3rd century
  - Venantius of Salona, 3rd century
- Wigand of Herford, author of a biography of Saint Waltger
- Wigand Siebel, German sociologist
- Wigand Wirt, German theologian
- Wigand of Marburg, German herald of the Teutonic Knights in Prussia

== Surname ==
- Johann Wigand (ca. 1523-1587), German Lutheran cleric and theologian, and Bishop of Pomesania
- Albert Julius Wilhelm Wigand (1821–1886), German botanist and opponent of Darwin's theory of evolution
- Jeffrey Wigand, former vice president of research and development at Brown & Williamson
- Justus Heinrich Wigand, German obstetrician

== Other ==
- Wigand (album), album by the German band Adorned Brood

== See also ==
- Weigand
- Wiegand
- Weygand
