= Günter Tembrock =

German zoologist (1918–2011)

Günter Tembrock (7 June 1918 – 26 January 2011) was an East German zoologist who pioneered the field of bioacoustics and biorhythms. He studied vocal communication in red foxes and birds. He was also a science popularizer and presented a television series.

Born in Berlin, he studied biology at the Humboldt University (then Friedrich-Wilhelm University) in 1937 and completed his doctoral work in 1941 on the biology of the carabid beetle Carabus ullrichi. He then became a lecturer at the university and was promoted to assistant professor in 1952. He established a facility for the study of animal behaviour in 1948 in the German Democratic Republic. His early scientific peers included Oskar Heinroth, Werner Quenstedt and Heinrich Kuntzen and at university he was influenced by Werner Ulrich and Konrad Herter.

During the war years, he escaped conscription using the fact that he suffered a lung infection that he contracted during the compulsory Arbeitsdienst.

He started recording animal sounds from around 1951 and established an archive that grew to hold 120,000 recordings before becoming part of the Berlin natural history museum in 1995. He mentored nearly a hundred doctoral students.

His major publications included a recording of the calls of birds of central Europe and a textbook on behaviour. As a science popularizer he presented the television series "Professor Tembrocks Rendezvous mit Tieren" ("Professor Tembrock's rendezvous with animals", 36 episodes from 1984 to 1991).
