= Mount Gunter =

Mountain in Graham Land, Antarctica

Mount Gunter (68°59′S 66°34′W) is a conspicuous mountain, 1,970 metres (6,460 ft) high, with precipitous black rock cliffs on its west side, rising at the south side of Hariot Glacier, 3 nautical miles (6 km) east of Briggs Peak, on the west side of the Antarctic Peninsula. It was first roughly surveyed by the British Graham Land Expedition in 1936–37, and was photographed by the Ronne Antarctic Research Expedition in November 1947 (trimetrogon air photography). It was surveyed by the Falkland Islands Dependencies Survey in 1958, and was named by the UK Antarctic Place-Names Committee after Edmund Gunter, an English mathematician whose "line of numbers" (1617) was the first step toward a slide rule; in 1620 he published tables of logarithms, sines and tangents, which revolutionized navigation.
