= Günter Faltin =

German economist and entrepreneur

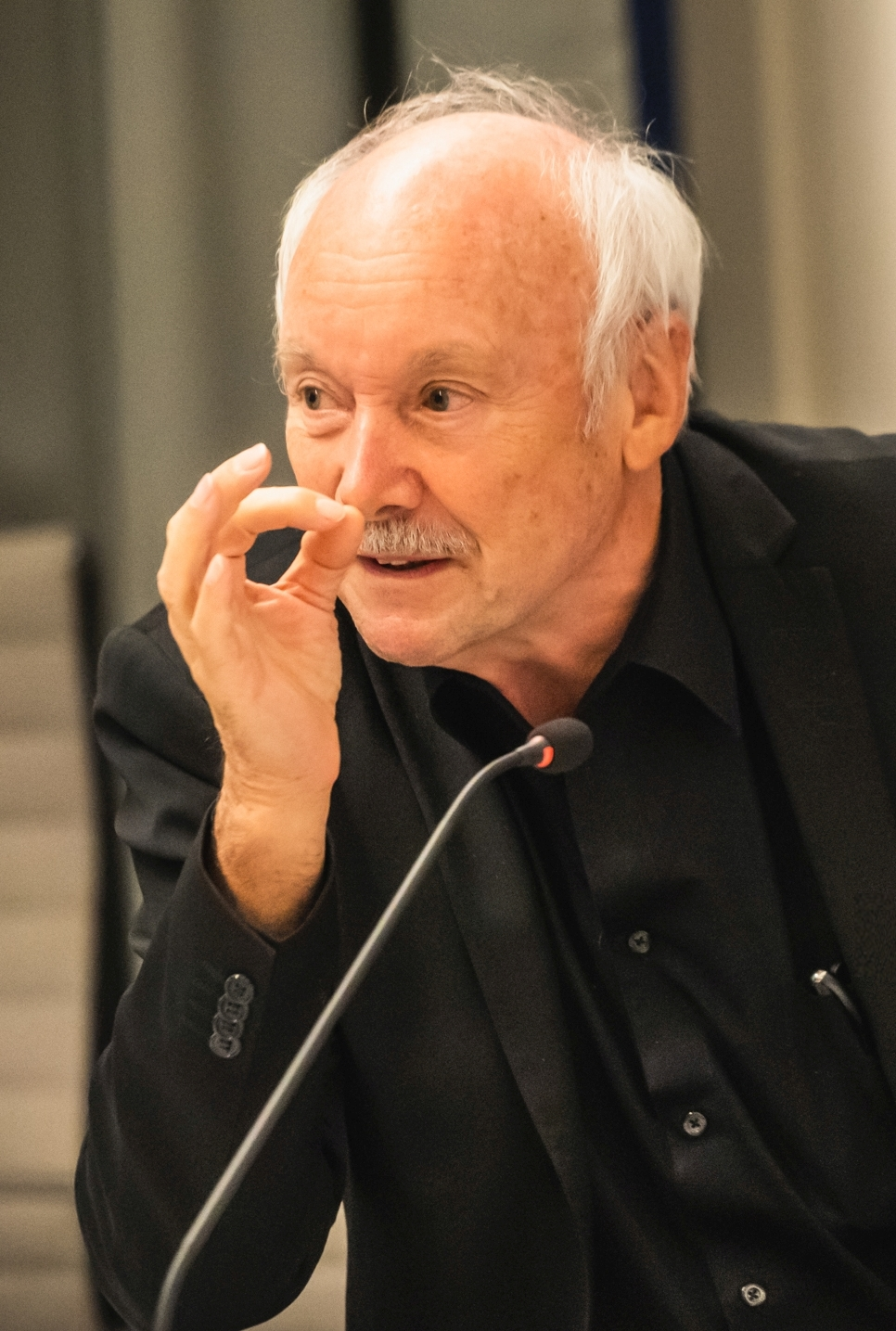
Günter Faltin, 2022

Günter Faltin (born 25 November 1944) is a German economist and entrepreneur.

== Early life and education ==
Gunter Faltin was born on 25 November 1944 in Bamberg, Germany. He graduated with a Dr. rer.soc. from the University of Konstanz in 1972.

== Career ==
=== Academia ===
In 1977 he became Professor of Economics at the Free University of Berlin, where he established the entrepreneurship department. Since 2013 he has been teaching as visiting professor at Chiang Mai University.

He was appointed for several years visiting professor to Asia by the German Academic Exchange Service. He gave lectures and workshops on entrepreneurship in many countries, among them the US, Canada, Mexico, Brazil, Russia, Georgia, South Korea, and Japan. From 1984 to 1988 he was deputy president of the German Society for Education, Invention and Innovation,(DABEI) Berlin Section.

In 1999 he founded the Entrepreneurship Lab at Free University of Berlin, which was adopted by Volkswagen's "Innovationscampus Wolfsburg" in 2000. From 2000 - 2003 he served as an expert for the project "Entrepreneurship in Education and Training in Russia and Ukraine", he conducted a series of workshops for the European Union's European Training Foundation in St. Petersburg and Kyiv from 2000 to 2003. In 2010 he followed an invitation of the government of Bhutan for a keynote to the conference on “High Tech and Entrepreneurship".

=== Business ===
In 1985, he founded the Projektwerkstatt GmbH, based on the "Teekampagne" ("tea campaign"). The "Teekampagne" is the world's largest importer of Darjeeling leaf tea, according to the Tea Board of India. In 1992 Faltin launched and sponsored the reforestation project S.E.R.V.E. ("Save the Environment & Regenerate Vital Employment"); the WWF is taking charge of the project on location in Darjeeling, India. Faltin is business angel and coach of startup companies such as eBuero AG (2001), RatioDrink AG (2006), and Waschkampagne.

In 2001 he established the Stiftung Entrepreneurship, a foundation aimed at furthering entrepreneurship and hosting the yearly "Entrepreneurship Summit".

== Teachings ==
Central to Faltin's teachings is that entrepreneurship today is available to everybody, not just for those with capital and patents. He dissociates clearly entrepreneurship from business administration. In a postindustrial society a well thought out entrepreneurial design is more decisive for the success of a start-up company than having much capital.

== Recognition ==
Faltin has earned the following awards and honours:

- 1997: Award by Price-Babson-Foundation, Boston, "For Bringing Entrepreneurial Vitality to Academe"
- 2007: Vision Award for Entrepreneurship
- 2009: Deutscher Gründerpreis: Special Award for "Teekampagne"
- 2010: Cross of Merit of the Federal Republic of Germany, for his pioneer work on entrepreneurship in Germany
- 2018: Dr. h. c. of the State University of Tiflis

== Publications ==
In his best-selling book Brain Versus Capital (English translation 2013, original title Kopf schlägt Kapital), he proposes a radically new approach to generating entrepreneurial ventures with an emphasis on ecologically and culturally sensitive issues.

- Bildung und Einkommenserzielung: Das Defizit: Unternehmerische Qualifikationen. In: Axt/Karcher/Schleich: Ausbildungs-oder Beschäftigungskrise in der Dritten Welt? Frankfurt o. M. (1987)
- The University and Entrepreneurship In: Education in Transition. Wiesbaden (1992)
- Reichtum von unten, (G. Faltin und J. Zimmer, Berlin 2. Ed 1996). Greek Ed. 2004
- Das Netz weiter werfen - Für eine neue Kultur unternehmerischen Handelns In: Faltin/Ripsas/Zimmer (Ed.) "Entrepreneurship. Wie aus Ideen Unternehmen werden". Munich (1998)
- Competencies for Innovative Entrepreneurship, In Adult Learning and the Future of Work, Unesco Institute for Education, Hamburg,(1999)
- Creating a Culture of Innovative Entrepreneurship In: Journal of International Business and Economy, Vol. 2, No. 1, (2001)
- Für eine Kultur des Unternehmerischen – Entrepreneurship als Qualifikation der Zukunft In: Leistung – Lust & Last Bucher/Lauermann/Walcher (Ed..). Vienna (2005)
- Erfolgreich gründen. Der Unternehmer als Künstler und Komponist. DIHK, Berlin (2007)
- Kopf schlägt Kapital. Die ganz andere Art, ein Unternehmen zu gründen. Von der Lust, ein Entrepreneur zu sein. Carl Hanser Verlag, Munich, 2008
- Kopf schlägt Kapital. Audio Book (7 compact discs), spoken by Stephan Reimertz, 2009
- Brain versus Capital Stiftung Entrepreneurship, Berlin, 2013
- Entrepreneurship als innovativer Prozess – von Anfangsideen, konzept-kreativen Gründern und der Entrepreneurial Society In: Peter Drucker - der Mann, der das Management geprägt hat: Erinnerungen und Ausblick zum 100. Geburtstag; Hermann Doppler, Markus Eurich, Günter Faltin, et al., Winfried W. Weber (Herausgeber); Sordon Verlag, 2009
- Wir sind das Kapital. Erkenne den Entrepreneur in dir. Aufbruch in eine intelligente Ökonomie. (ISBN 9783867744195) Murmann Verlag, Hamburg, 2015
- Handbuch Entrepreneurship. Springer Gabler, Wiesbaden 2018. ISBN 978-3-658-04993-5
