= Günter Neumann (scientist) =

German agronomist

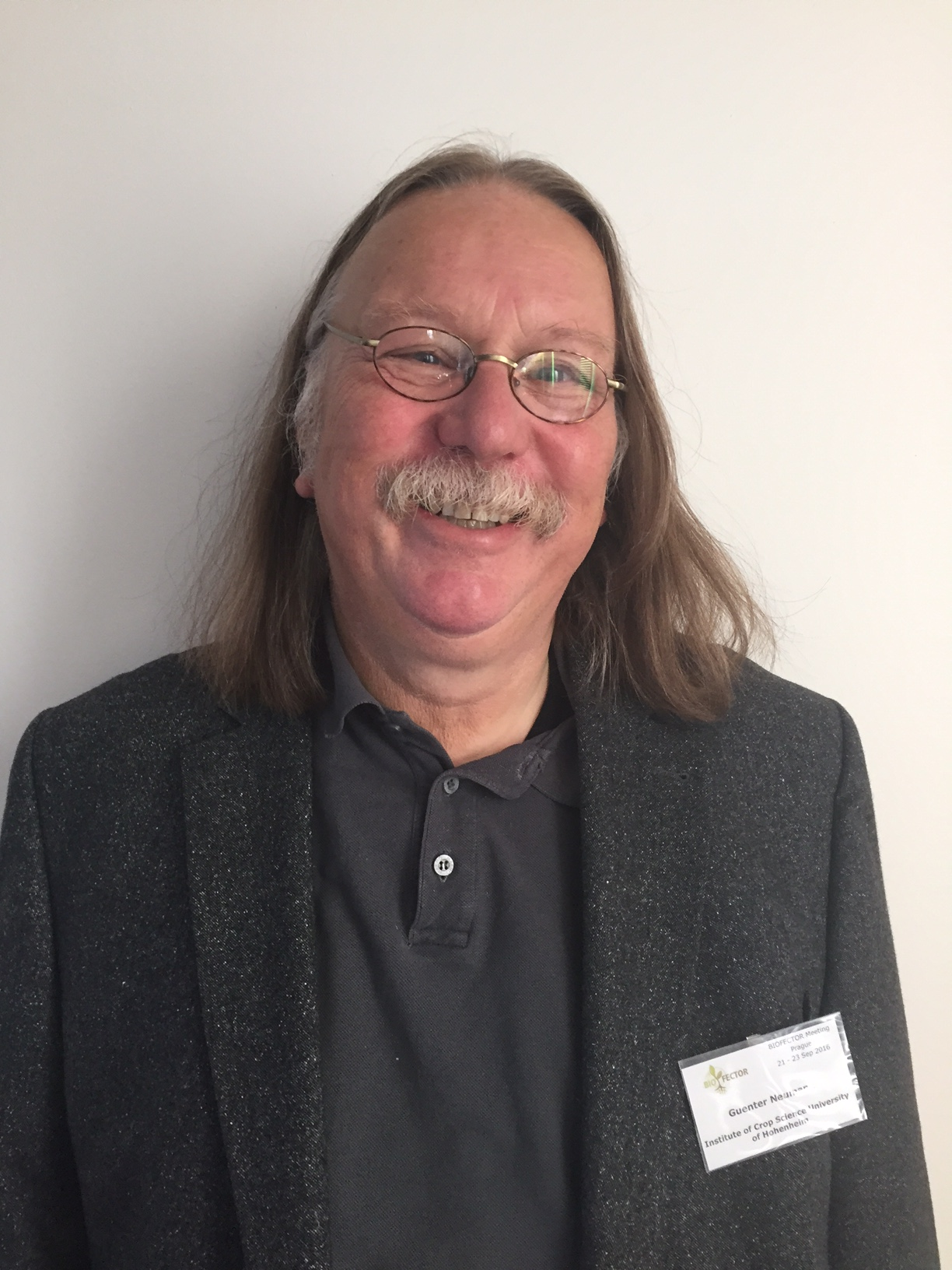
Guenter Neumann Hohenheim 2016

Günter Neumann (born 27 November 1958 in Hechingen, West Germany) is an agricultural scientist at the University of Hohenheim. He is a plant physiologist specialising in rhizosphere research and scientific coordinator of the EU Research Project Biofector.

== Life and work ==
Neumann studied biology at University of Tübingen under Achim Hager with plant physiology as a speciality, and molecular biology under Axel Brennicke at the Humboldt University of Berlin. He qualified as Dr. rer. nat. with a dissertation entitled Comparative Investigation of the Regulation of the Flavinoid Biosynthesis of Munzia-Oenotheren of Known Genetic composition.

From 1992 until 2002 he was a scientific colleague of Horst Marschner at the University of Hohenheim, under Burkhard Sattelmacher at the Institute of Plant Nutrition at University of Kiel, and in the group of Fuoso Zhang at the Agricultural University of Peking.

From 2002 until 2008 he was a Group Leader for Plant Nutrition and Fertilisation at the Institute of Plant Nutrition in Hohenheim, and obtained his professorship in 2008. Since 2010 Neumann has been Apl. Professor for Plant Nutrition and Rhizospere Research and he has been concurrently scientific coordinator of the international bio-effector project Biofector since 2012.

== Memberships and affiliations ==
- German Society for Plant Nutrition
