= Günter Preuß =

German footballer and manager

Personal information
- Date of birth: 10 November 1936 (age 89)
- Place of birth: Duisburg, Germany
- Height: 1.82 m (6 ft 0 in)
- Position: Defender

Youth career
- 1948–1956: Meidericher SV

Senior career*
Years	Team	Apps	(Gls)
1956–1969	Meidericher SV	450	(0)

International career
1957–1958	West Germany U-23	2	(0)

Managerial career
- 1967–1969; 1985-1986: MSV Duisburg (assistant coach)
- 1970–1973: Eintracht Duisburg
- 1973–1975: SV Neukirchen
- 1975–1976: VfB 03 Kleve
- 1976–1979: VfB Lohberg
- 1979–1980: Hamborn 07
- 1981–1982: MSV Duisburg (assistant coach)
- 1985: MSV Duisburg
- * Club domestic league appearances and goals

Günter Preuß (born 10 November 1936 in Duisburg) is a former German football player and manager who was active for MSV Duisburg for many years. He played more than 450 times for his club, of which 77 were happening in the newly founded premier league (Bundesliga). He was team captain from 1961 to 1966. In 1963, he and his teammates qualified for the inaugural season of the German Bundesliga. One year later, the team he led as the captain became runner-up at the end of the first Bundesliga season.

== Youth and Oberliga West (1948−1963) ==
Preuß grew up in Meiderich which is a quarter of Duisburg and began playing football shortly after the end of the Second World War. He started playing on the street and football soon became his most important occupation. In 1948, he entered the youth team of Meidericher SV (in 1967 renamed as MSV Duisburg). The defender passed through the different age brackets and finally joined the U-19 where he took the role of the team captain. As he showed a certain talent, he was regularly nominated for the city selection of Duisburg.

During the season 1955–56, Meiderich only played in the second division after having been member of the Oberliga for six consecutive seasons. As West Germany did not have a national league during this time the Oberliga West was the highest level. Preuß was 19 years old and considered as a candidate to join the second division team. When the defender Hans Sehlhoff was injured, the young player took his position for a match against STV Horst-Emscher in March 1956. At the start of the match, he made an important save on the goal line and his team finally won the match by 6–1. As a result, Preuß received the offer to sign a contract and became a part of the squad by accepting this offer. He personally did not play again until the end of the season, but his teammates were able to qualify for the Oberliga.

In the Oberliga, Meiderich did not have to fight against a possible relegation but usually made part of the top half of the table during the following years. Preuß was increasingly called up and broke into the first team during the season 1957–58. His team had successful years and even reached the fourth rank in 1958. By the time, the defender became one of the leaders and then received the role of the captain in 1961. One year later, the foundation of the Bundesliga scheduled for 1963 was enacted and Meidericher SV officially applied for a membership. The conditions for a qualification were not completely transparent which meant that the club had to be as good as possible during the season 1962–63. Preuß missed the initial phase due to an injury but then returned. During the final matchdays he even had to replace certain functions of manager Willi Multhaup who had announced to join SV Werder Bremen and thereby lost the recognition of his team. The MSV ended on the third position and received the message to be qualified for the Bundesliga.

== Player in the Bundesliga (1963−1969) ==
In summer 1963, the team was supplemented by Helmut Rahn and the new manager Rudi Gutendorf but was still mainly composed by players who were born in Meiderich and developed in the youth teams of the club. They were considered as outsiders who probably would not be able to maintain their place in the new league. Preuß and his teammates started on 24 August 1963 with a 4–1 win against Karlsruher SC and surprisingly stayed part of the top group during the next time. A main reason for the success was a modern formation who integrated the full backs into the offensive actions of the team. Meiderich finally ended on the second rank behind 1. FC Köln.

The MSV stayed in the top half of the table during the next years although they could not replicate the great success of the first year. By the time, Preuß lost some of his dominance within the team and in 1966, Werner Krämer was determined to be the new captain. The former captain played his last match in the Bundesliga in June 1967. Afterwards, he officially stayed part of the squad for two more years but focused on his new role as assistant coach. He totally participated in 77 Bundesliga matches, 150 Oberliga matches and one second division match without ever scoring a goal.

== National team ==
During his years in the Oberliga, he was nominated for the West German national under-23 team. He debuted on the 21 December 1957 during a match against Hungary. Afterwards, he participated in a second match against Belgium in February 1958 but had to be replaced at the half time because he suffered from an ulcer. This meant the end of his career in national selection teams. Sepp Herberger later announced that he could possibly join the senior national team but this finally did not happen.

== Managerial career ==
Between 1967 and 1969, he stayed part of his old club which existed under the new name MSV Duisburg and worked as an assistant coach. In 1970, he joined Eintracht Duisburg and attended the first steps of Rudolf Seliger who later became a member of the national team. He continued his managerial career at the amateur clubs SV Neukirchen, VfB 03 Kleve and VfB Lohberg before signing at Hamborn 07 in 1979. One year later, he reached the promotion of his team but later declared his demission because of severe problems with the club's supporters. This is explainable by the fact that Hamborn was once the main rival of his former club MSV. In 1981, he returned to this club where he had different roles during the following years. He was directeur sportif, assistant coach and even the first coach during some weeks. In 1986, he left the club which meant his retirement from football.
