= Phil Gunter =

English footballer (1932–2007)

Personal information
- Full name: Philip Edward Gunter
- Date of birth: 6 January 1932
- Place of birth: Portsmouth, England
- Date of death: 13 July 2007 (aged 75)
- Place of death: Australia
- Position: Defender

Senior career*
| Years | Team | Apps | (Gls) |
| 1951–1964 | Portsmouth | 321 | (2) |
| 1964–1966 | Aldershot | 78 | (8) |
| Total | | 399 | (10) |

International career
| 1952 | England B | 1 | (0) |
| 1954 | England U23 | 1 | (0) |
- * Club domestic league appearances and goals

Philip Edward Gunter (6 January 1932 – 13 July 2007) was an English footballer who played for Portsmouth and Aldershot.

== Career ==
Gunter spent most of his career with Portsmouth, making over 300 league appearances for the club between 1951 and 1964. He finished his career with Aldershot.

Gunter also represented his country at an international level, playing once each for England B and England under-23s.

== Personal life ==
In the 1970s and 1980s Gunter taught PE and Games at Bedales School in Petersfield Hampshire. Gunter moved to Australia after retiring. He was the older brother of David Gunter, who also played in the English Football League.
