= Günter Lorenz =

Austrian murderer

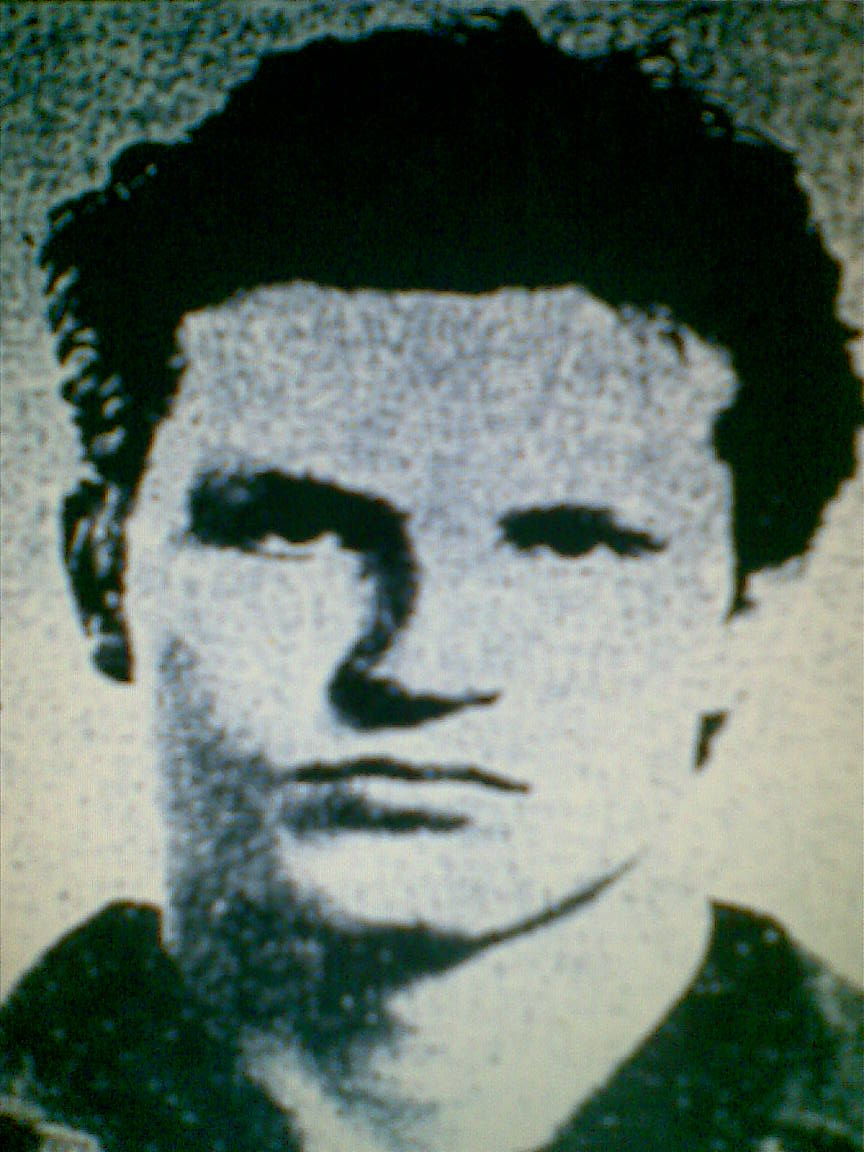
Günter Lorenz

Günter Lorenz (born 1964 or 1965 in Wels) is an Austrian murderer.

== Double murder ==
On February 15, 1983, the bodies of 43-year-old Sieglinde Eckert and her eldest daughter, 18-year-old Ursula, were found in Ungargasse 12 in Landstraße. A police doctor found that the cause of death in both victims was a shot to the head from a rifle loaded with explosive bullets. The bodies of the victims were highly disfigured- enough for the officials to initially be unable to distinguish between mother and daughter, with only the younger daughters being able to identify the two.

Despite questioning all the neighbours, nobody had seen an armed man or heard a gunshot. There were no signs of a forced entry in the apartment door, which led investigators to believe that the victims might have known the offender and opened the door for him. The questioning of a friend of Ursula provided a possible lead to the officials. She said that she had talked to Ursula shortly before the murder, who stated that she had recently been visited by her ex-boyfriend, Paul, and that he had a weapon with him- which resulted in her ceasing communications with him. The police investigated Paul, who was found to be Günter Lorenz. He was an 18 year old who had just passed his exams with distinction and was living in a Vienna caretaker's apartment. In the first round of interrogations, he denied having anything to do with the murders until the investigators found personal belongings of the victims in his home. He then said that he had wanted to rob his ex-girlfriend, but did not dare to do it alone, which is why he had asked his 16-year-old Peter Daubinger to accompany him. However, Daubinger, according to Günter, had brought a weapon with which he murdered the two women and had fled with their belongings. Since Daubinger was untraceable, the police initiated a search for him and warned of his threat. In the meantime, Daubinger was presented as the culprit in the media.

== Confessions and sentencing ==
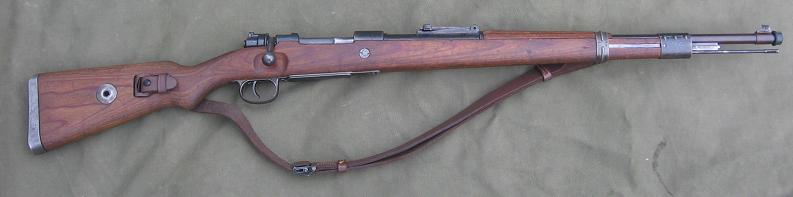
Gewehr 98; Lorenz committed all three murders with a weapon of this type

After two days of interminable interrogations, Lorenz began to contradict himself. It was then ascertained that Lorenz and Daubinger could never, as stated by Lorenz, have stolen 10,000, but instead a maximum of 2,000 shillings, and thus Daubinger could possibly have stolen the remaining 8,000 shillings. Finally, Lorenz confessed to having murdered the two women himself. He used a Gewehr 98 with explosive ammunition, normally used for big game hunting. He had bought the ammo in a Viennese gun shop. In order to be able to wear it concealed, he had sawn off the piston and used a piece of carpet as a silencer. After a few hours, he finally confessed to the murder of his cousin, who was killed with three gunshots and then beheaded on February 9 in an abandoned construction site on the banks of the Danube near Reichsbrücke, in order to render it difficult to identify. Lorenz then led the investigators to Daubinger's body, which he had buried under a snowdrift on Donauinsel.

The extreme cold-blooded and unrepentant nature of the 18-year-old not only astonished the investigators, but later led to the imposition of the maximum penalty. Just before he wrote a confession, he had asked with a smile if he could start studying and practising sport in jail, and learned about the choice of books in detention centers. He also gave no comprehensible motive to date and said only that he did not like the three victims and thought they conspired against him. At first he even tried to portray Daubinger's killing as self-defense. The police assume he murdered his victims out of pure lust for killing.

Despite having a notable personality disorder and mental dysfunction to a great extent, he was declared sane. Docent Dr. Willibald Sluga from the Department of Psychiatry said that he did not know a single crime that was comparable to it and that it was committed by a mentally ill individual. Prosecutor Ernst Kloyber "has not experienced such crimes in 15 years of work experience" and demanded the maximum penalty, while Lorenz's defender Gunther Gahleitner cited the accused's poor childhood and wanted for him not be condemned, but be sent to a mental institution. The last words of the defendant were: "My defender is psychotic."

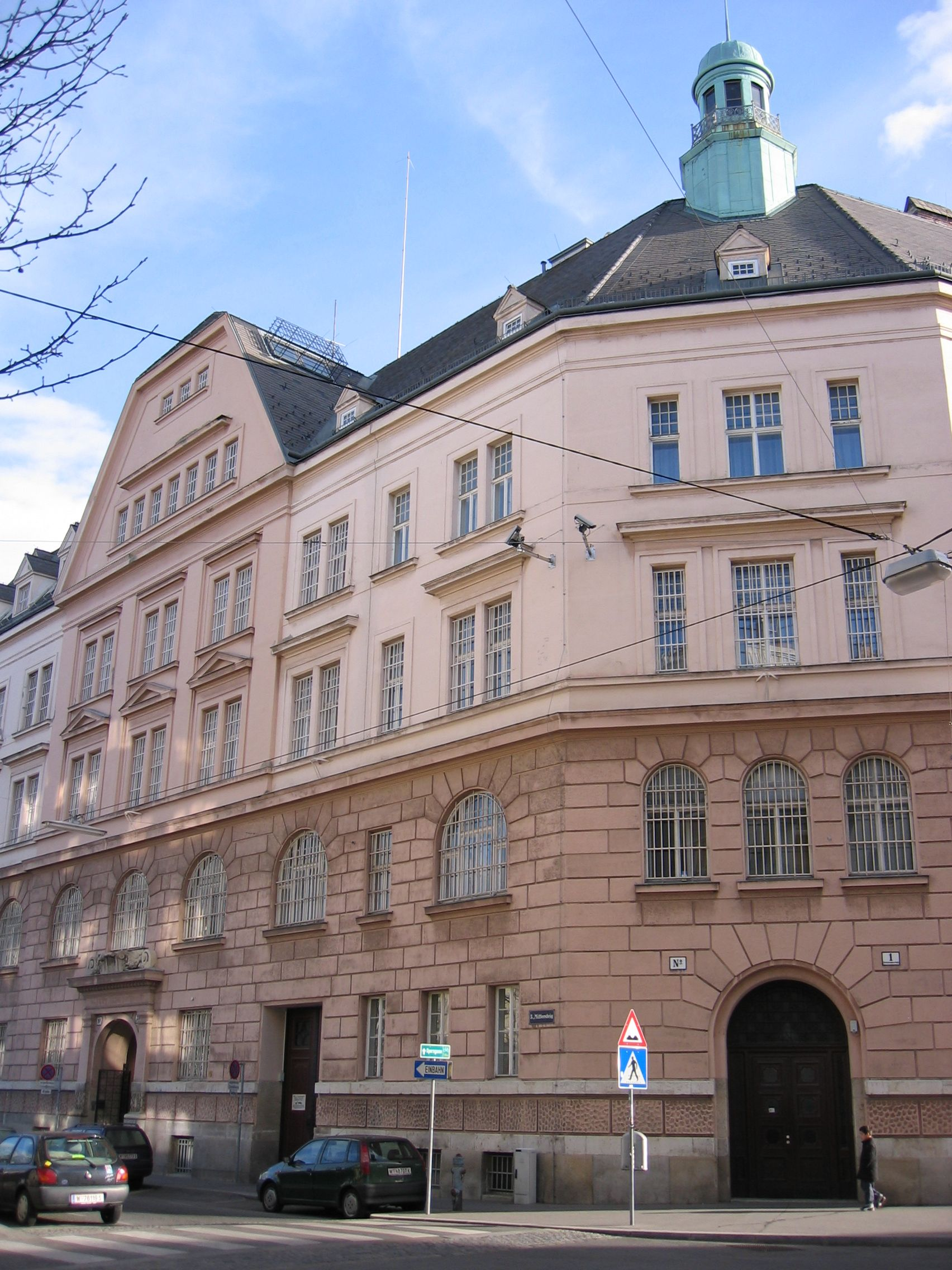
Vienna's Mittersteig Prison; Here Lorenz served his 20-year prison sentence

On March 14, 1984, Günter Lorenz was sentenced to 20 years imprisonment by presiding Justice Paul Weiser and was sent to a mental institution. In 2004, his dismissal was prevented by a psychiatric report, whereupon he began rampaging in Mittersteig Prison, threatening a psychologist and smashing furniture. He was overwhelmed by seven officials and was later transferred to the Stein Prison.

== Impact ==
The characteristic murder of Daubinger triggered an outrage. His picture was published in the newspapers and he had been named a "murderer", "double murderer" and "killer", based solely on Lorenz's statements. His affiliation to the right-wing scene and his alleged obsession with weapons were proven completely unfounded. Many newspapers then published a letter of apology in their daily editions, in which they accused themselves of the media's judicial murder.

The book and film rights for Lorenz was secured by Stern magazine. The price guaranteed him the coverage of his lawyer's fees.

The murders also triggered a political discussion about the weapons law. The two deputies to the National Council, Robert Lichal and Harald Ofner, called for a tightening of the weapons law, while Interior Minister Erwin Lanc and deputy Hans Hobl emphasized that laws alone cannot prevent such bloody acts. It was criticized that requirements for the acquisition of handguns were strict, while they were relatively liberal for the acquisition of long guns such as pump action shotguns and carbines. However, with the introduction of a firearms license, more than 1.2 million gun owners would have to be prosecuted, and then a subsequent increase in the illegal arms trade was feared, so the laws remained untouched.

The murder weapon, together with original newspaper reports, can be seen in the Vienna Crime Museum.

In addition, the case of Günter Lorenz was examined in the book Traces of Evil. (ISBN 3-8000-7310-2)
