= Günter Hoffmann =

Günter Hoffmann may refer to:

- Günter Hoffmann (cyclist) (born 1939), German Olympic cyclist
- Günter Hoffmann (1951–1984), German singer, part of the duet Hoffmann & Hoffmann with his brother, Michael Hoffmann
- Günther Hoffmann-Schönborn (1905–1970), officer in the German Wehrmacht

== See also ==
- Gunther O. Hofmann
