= New Zealand Planning Institute =

The New Zealand Planning Institute (NZPI) is a professional body for planners, resource managers, urban designers and environmental practitioners in New Zealand, primarily serving the interests of town and spatial planners. Its purpose is to promote professional excellence and works in partnership with planners throughout the country, to assist them to shape the future according to the changing and diverse needs of all New Zealanders. The institute was established in 1949.

As part of a dynamic, varied and challenging profession, NZPI's 2000 members are involved in strategic planning initiatives and implementation of urban and rural plans. Planning is a complex profession requiring the input of a variety of different disciplines. Planners work in cities, suburbs, and towns and can specialise in, for example, transportation, urban design, or rural environments. They are students, consultants, planning directors, teachers, lawyers, and planning commissioners and each and everyone contributes to our communities, the Institute and planning practice.

== Leadership ==
The current Chair is Bryce Julyan. He is supported by the following Board members: Andrew Willis, Julie Bevan, Robert Schofield, Keith Hovell, Jane Douglas, Todd Whittaker and Dr Caroline Miller.

NZPI aims to Empower planners and promote professional excellence. It serves its members in a number of ways:

- Advocacy
- Continuing Professional Development
- Networking events
- Sharing of best practice
- Accreditation of planning degrees
- Job Board
