= Gunder =

Gunder is both a given name and a surname. Notable people with the name include:

Given name:

- Andre Gunder Frank (1929–2005), German-American economic historian and sociologist
- Gunder Anton Johannesen Jahren (1858–1933), the Norwegian Minister of Agriculture 1920–1921
- Gunder Bengtsson (1946–2019), former Swedish association football coach
- Gunder Gundersen (1930–2005), Norwegian Nordic combined skier and sports official
- Gunder Hägg (1918–2004), Swedish runner and multiple world record breaker of the 1940s
- Gunder Olson (1852–1948), North Dakota public servant and politician with the Republican Party

Surname:

- Jeane Daniel Gunder (1888–1948), American entomologist who specialised in butterflies
- Michael Gunder, Senior planning lecturer in the School of Architecture and Planning at the University of Auckland
