= Günter Zeitler =

German handball player

Medal record

Men's handball

Representing East Germany

World Championships
Silver medal – second place	1966 Austria	Team

Günter Zeitler is a German handballer, who competed for the SC Dynamo Berlin / Sportvereinigung (SV) Dynamo. He won the silver medal at the world championships, 1966.
