= Günter Vollmer =

- Born: 15 May 1917
- Died: 10 December 2004 (aged 87)
- Military career
- Allegiance: Nazi Germany; West Germany
- Branch: Army
- Service years: ?–1945; 1956–77
- Rank: Hauptmann (Wehrmacht); Generalmajor (Bundeswehr)
- Conflicts: World War II
- Awards: Knight's Cross of the Iron Cross

Günter Vollmer (15 May 1917 – 10 December 2004) was a highly decorated officer in the Wehrmacht of Nazi Germany during World War II, and a recipient of the Knight's Cross of the Iron Cross.

== Awards ==
- Knight's Cross of the Iron Cross on 20 April 1943 as Oberleutnant of the Reserves and leader of the 3./Grenadier-Regiment 411
