= Gunter Segers =

Belgian writer, graphic designer and illustrator

Gunter Segers is a Belgian children's book author, Belgian non-fiction book author, graphic designer and illustrator.

== Published picture books ==
- "Flappie waar komen de kindjes vandaan?" (1993)
- "Een sneeuwman met een plan" ("Snowman with a plan", 2004)°
- "Sneeuwman gaat op reis" ("Snowman goes travelling", 2005)°
- "Sneeuwman in de lucht' ('Snowman in the air", 2005)°
- "Een dagje vrij voor klein konijn" ("Little Rabbit's day-off", illustraties van Heidi D'hamers, 2005)°
- "Een grote vriend voor klein konijn" ("Little Rabbit's big friend", illustraties van Heidi D'hamers, 2006)°
- "Klein Konijn en de wonderwortel" ("Little Rabbit and the amazing carrot", illustraties van Heidi D'hamers, 2007)°
- "Klein Konijn en de Rommelbeer" (illustraties van Heidi D'hamers, 2008)°
- "Max de muis ontdekt de stad" (Standaard/Technopolis, tekst van Annemie Bosmans, 2007)
- "De Groene IJsbeer" (Lannoo/Djapo, tekst van Wouter Thielemans, 2012)
- "De Scharlaken Pompelmoes" (Lannoo/Djapo, tekst van Wouter Thielemans, 2013)
- "Gloob & Teo: Feest in het bos" (Les Iles/ Djapo 2014)
- "Gloob & Teo en het Zeemonster" (Les Iles/ Djapo 2014)
- "Het grote avontuur van Billy en Bonnie" (Les Iles/ Djapo 2014)
- "Op stap met Didier" (Les Iles / 2015)
- "Gloob & Teo: Bloem" (Les Iles/ Djapo 2016)
- "Gloob & Teo: In de wolken" (Les Iles/ Djapo 2016)
- "België" (Lannoo 2016)
- "Gloob & Teo: Spetterpret" (Les Iles/ Djapo 2017)
- "Gloob & Teo: (h)eerlijke Bananentaart" (Les Iles/ Djapo 2017)
- "Gloob & Teo's Verhalenboek" (Les Iles/ Djapo 2017)
- "Sinterklaas boekengeschenk" (bPost / 2015, 2016, 2017, 2020, 2021)
- "Sinterklaas Zoekboek" (ZNU 2018)
- "Terug naar school Zoekboek" (ZNU 2019)
- "Beer op de bank" (Averbode, tekst van Evi Roovers, 2020)
- "Pas op kleine leeuw" (Averbode, tekst van Evi Roovers, 2020)
- "Een noot op je kop" (Averbode, tekst van Aag Vernelen, 2020)
- "Blijf wakker, Mot" (Averbode, tekst van Aag Vernelen, 2021)
- "Was ik maar klein" (Averbode, tekst van Aag Vernelen, 2023)
- "Hier wordt gewerkt" (Pelckmans/Etwie 2021)

° Books have been translated and published in South Korea, France, Japan, Taiwan, China, Austria, Germany, ...

== Non-fiction books ==
- "Hélène Dutrieu, de vrouw die door de Olympia vloog" (Les Iles / 2021)

Collaborator (illustrations, lay-out, design) for the highly acclaimed animated short 'Rumours' ('Geruchten') by director Frits Standaert .

Contributed to The Residents DVD The Commercial Album, released in 2004).

Art-Director at Les Iles publishers
