= Günter Böckle =

German software engineer

Günter Böckle (born 1949) is a German software engineer and project manager at Siemens Corporate Technology, known for his work on Software product line engineering.

Böckle received his Ph.D. in mathematics in 1976 from the University of Stuttgart. He started his career in industry working in the fields of software engineering, and systems engineering, particularly in systems modelling and simulation and evaluation. Late 1990s he moved into the field of software product line engineering, on which he published several papers and books. He is member INCOSE, the International Council on Systems Engineering.

== Selected publications ==
- Klaus Pohl, Günter Böckle, and Frank Van Der Linden. Software product line engineering: Foundations, Principles, and Techniques. Springer 10 (2005): 3-540.

Articles, a selection:

- Böckle, G., Muñoz, J. B., Knauber, P., Krueger, C. W., do Prado Leite, J. C. S., van der Linden, F., ... & Weiss, D. M. (2002). Adopting and institutionalizing a product line culture. In Software Product Lines (pp. 49–59). Springer Berlin Heidelberg.
- Knauber, P., Bermejo, J., Böckle, G., do Prado Leite, J. C. S., van der Linden, F., Northrop, L., ... & Weiss, D. M. (2002). "Quantifying product line benefits." In Software Product-Family Engineering (pp. 155–163). Springer Berlin Heidelberg.
- Böckle, G., Clements, P., McGregor, J. D., Muthig, D., & Schmid, K. (2004). "A cost model for software product lines." In Software Product-Family Engineering (pp. 310–316). Springer Berlin Heidelberg.
