= Hans Günther =

Hans or Hanns Günther may refer to:

- Hans F. K. Günther (1891–1968), German race researcher and eugenicist in the Nazi Party
- Hans Günther (SS officer) (1910–1945), officer of the Schutzstaffel (SS)
- Hanns Günther, pen name of Walter de Haas (1886–1969), German author, translator, and editor of popular science books
