= Günter Krüger =

Günter Krüger may refer to:

- Günter Krüger (canoeist), West German sprint canoer
- Günter Krüger (judoka) (born 1953), German judoka
