= Heinz Günter Mebusch =

Heinz Günter Mebusch (1952–2001) was a German photographer and experimental artist born in Düsseldorf.

== Biography ==
Mebusch studied photography and visual communication with Otto Steinert and Erich vom Endt. He lived and worked in about forty countries in Europe, Africa and America. Mebusch spoke fluent English, Spanish, French and was familiar with Greek and Arabic. He was also a lecturer at the Folkwang-School in Essen and organized and curated art and photo-projects, including the Beuys Festival in 1991 in Düsseldorf.

== His works ==
Mebusch's estate maintains archives of his film negatives, published vintage prints and manuscripts on photography, art and philosophy. His estate is administrated by the charitable European Artforum Culture Foundation (ACF).

== Exhibitions ==
Mebusch exhibited in Costa Rica, Luxembourg, Austria, Germany and USA and represented Germany at the Venice Biennale in 1999.

== Artist portraits ==
His ongoing project of over two decades was Face to Face, portraits of modern and contemporary artists. More than 200 artists-portraits were realized from 1979 to 2000. A few working and vintage prints were made still before his early death. In a few cases these photo-prints have additional signatures and over-paintings by the respective artist. A portfolio of all his portraits was prepared by Mebusch and a limited number of these portraits were prepared by as large-format prints. The final edition, based on Mebusch's specifications, will be realized under the title Face to Face – Planet of the Artists, by ArtForum Editions, through the Artforum Culture Foundation.

Black and white portraits and colour prints were made of Joseph Beuys, James Lee Byars, Ford Beckmann, Fernando Botero, Herman de Vries, Felix Droese, Erró, Keith Haring, Dennis Hopper, Jörg Immendorff, Martin Kippenberger, Meret Oppenheim, A.R. Penck, Gerhard Richter, Richard Serra, Yannis Tsarouchis and Wolf Vostell. This project is in context with the projects of the same title by Vera Isler-Leiner, who had met Mebusch in Kassel in 1996.
