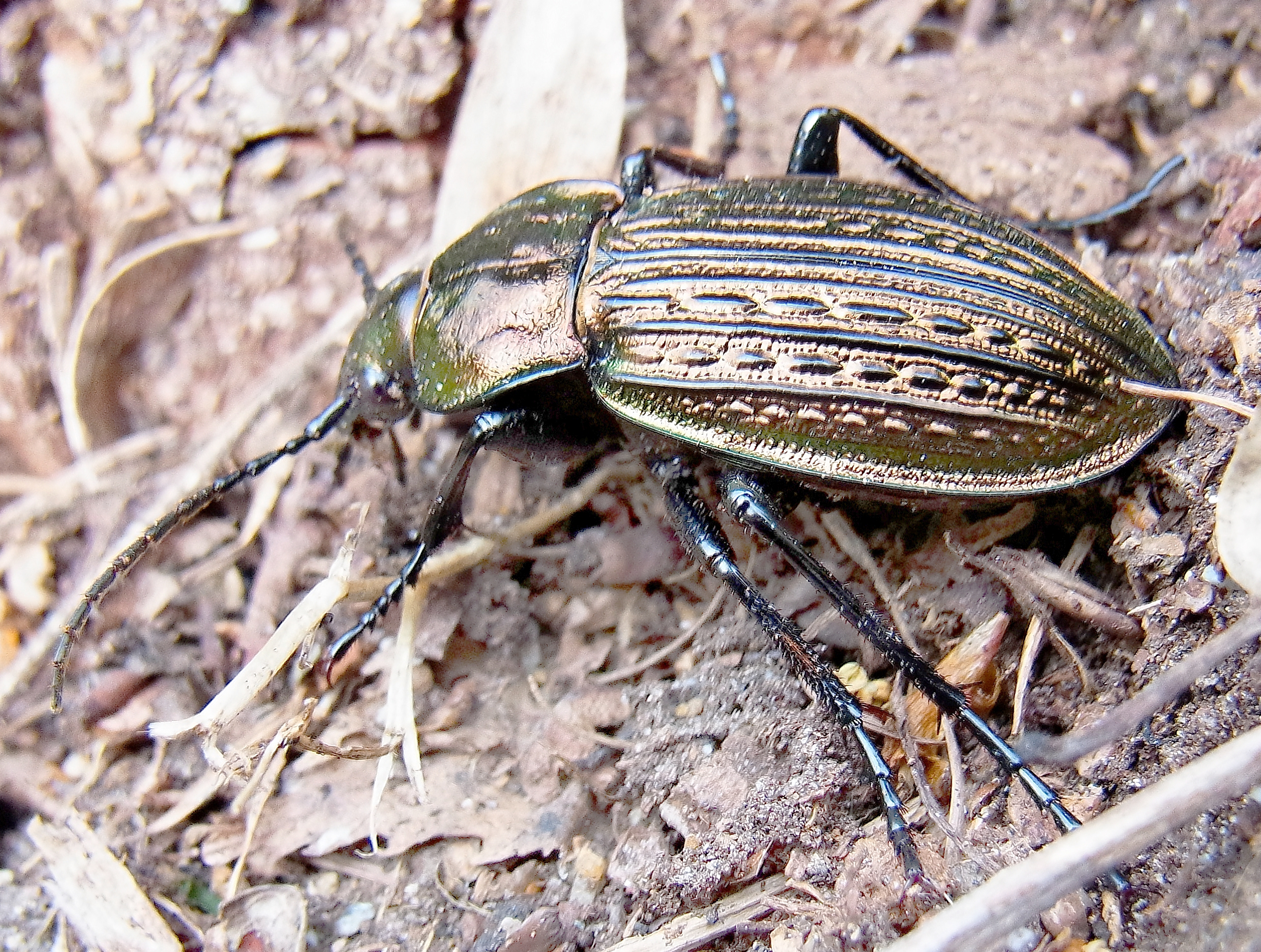

Scientific classification
- Kingdom: Animalia
- Phylum: Arthropoda
- Class: Insecta
- Order: Coleoptera
- Suborder: Adephaga
- Family: Carabidae
- Genus: Carabus
- Species: C. ulrichii

Binomial name
- Carabus ulrichii Germar, 1824

Synonyms
- Carabus ulrichi Carabus ullrichi Carabus ullrichii

= Carabus ulrichii =

Species of beetle

Carabus ulrichii is a species of ground beetle from the family Carabidae originating from the Central Hungarian Basin and found in Bulgaria, the Czech Republic, Germany, Great Britain, Hungary, Luxembourg, Moldova, Poland, Romania, Slovakia, Ukraine, and all of the republics of the former Yugoslavia. They are coloured black, with a green pronotum. The species formation happened in Pleistocene.
