= Günter Haumer =

Austrian baritone

Günter Haumer (born 1973) is an Austrian operatic baritone. Since 2012, he has been a member of Ensembles of the Vienna Volksoper.

== Life ==
Born in Vienna, Haumer completed his education at the University of Music and Performing Arts Vienna first in clarinet and piano. This was followed by studies in singing at the same place and at the Royal College of Music in London.

Haumer has performed roles in numerous countries in Europe and South America such as the lead in Don Giovanni, Il Conte Almaviva in Le nozze di Figaro, Giorgio Germont in La Traviata, Ping in Turandot, Don Alfonso in Così fan tutte, Malatesta in Don Pasquale, Danilo in The Merry Widow, Dr. Falke in Die Fledermaus, Aeneas in Dido and Aeneas. He has also appeared in contemporary operas, as Jesus in Jonathan Harvey's Passion and Resurrection and as Amfortas in Mea culpa by Christoph Schlingensief. Haumer has sung under the direction of Gustavo Dudamel, Ivor Bolton, Jesús López Cobos, Fabio Luisi, Peter Schreier, Kristjan Järvi, Sylvain Cambreling, Martin Haselböck and Erwin Ortner. Performances in the most important European concert halls and festivals such as the Cité de la musique (Paris), Auditorio Nacional in Madrid, National Philharmonic in Warsaw, Dresden Philharmonic, Festival Oude Muziek in Utrecht, Theater an der Wien, Wiener Festwochen, Wiener Musikverein, Konzerthaus, Vienna, Styriarte Graz and Carinthian Summer.

In 2016 and 2017, he performed as soloist at the gala "Christmas in Vienna" alongside Juan Diego Flórez, Anne Sofie von Otter and Olga Peretyatko.

Haumer teaches singing at the University of Music and Performing Arts Vienna.

== Discography ==
Numerous CD and DVD recordings on labels such as Deutsche Grammophon, Hyperion, cpo as well as radio and television broadcasts have been issued. For example, a Lied CD with works by Richard Strauss, accompanied by Roger Vignoles, was released by Hyperion records in the anniversary year.
