= Klaus Wiegand =

German major general (born 1941)

- Born: August 16, 1941; Stadtilm, Thuringia, Germany
- Allegiance: GDR
- Branch: NPA; NPA Land Forces
- Service years: 1959-1990
- Rank: Major general
- Awards

Klaus Wiegand (born 16 August 1941) was a major general in the East German People's Army. Between 1987 and 1990 he was in charge of "Military District III" of the German Democratic Republic, headquartered in Leipzig.

== Life ==
Klaus Wiegand was born during the war in Stadtilm, a very small town some 30 km (20 miles) south of Erfurt in the southern part of what was then central Germany. His father worked in a shoe factory. Following his school final exams he started an apprenticeship as a machinist. By this time his home region had become the German Democratic Republic, formally founded in October 1949 from what had previously been the Soviet occupation zone established following May 1945, which had marked Germany's defeat in the war. Wiegand cut short his apprenticeship and on 8 April 1959 joined the young country's recently established army. He joined a tank regiment and received basic training as a gunner before being transferred to the Land Forces Officer Academy where he studied from 1959 till 1961. After this, till 1966, he commanded a unit in the Fourth Tank Regiment. Meanwhile in 1962 he joined East Germany's ruling Socialist Unity Party of Germany (SED / Sozialistische Einheitspartei Deutschlands). Between 1966 and 1971 he served as a Staff Officer for information with the Fourth Motorised Protection Division based in Erfurt. Between 1971 and 1975 he attended the "Michail Wassiljewitsch Frunse" Combined Officers' Military Academy ("Михаил Васильевич Фрунзе" Общевойсковая академия Вооруженных Сил Российской Федерации) in Moscow, emerging with a degree in Military Sciences.

After getting back to East Germany, Wiegand took charge of the Reconnaissance sub-department of his former regiment, before being promoted in 1979 to become head of the operations department, still with the Fourth Motorised Protection Division. There followed a switch in 1979 to a staff position in charge of the Operations Department of "Military District III": the position covered approximately the southernmost third of the German Democratic Republic and was based in Erfurt. Here he worked with Major General Alfred Krause. Between 1980 and 1982 he was back in Moscow, training at the General Staff Academy. On his return he became deputy commander and chief of staff with the Seventh Tank Division, based in Dresden.

From 1 May 1984 till 31 October 1986 he was based in Halle, where he commanded the Eleventh Motorised Protection Division. On 1 March 1986, in the batch of promotions created in celebration of the thirtieth anniversary of the National People's Army, he was promoted to the rank of major general. He served for a year as chief of staff and deputy chief of "Military District III" before himself taking charge of District III in succession to Wolfgang Steger. He served in this position between 1987 and 1990, resigning his post a few days before the enactment of German reunification on 2 October 1990.
