= Klaus Pohl (computer scientist) =

German computer scientist (born 1960)

- Born: 1960 (age 65–66)
- Education: University of Konstanz; RWTH Aachen University
- Scientific career
- Fields: Computer science
- Workplaces: University of Duisburg-Essen

Klaus Pohl (born 1960 as Klaus Mussgnug in Karlsruhe) is a German computer scientist and Professor for Software Systems Engineering at the University of Duisburg-Essen, mainly known for his work in Requirements Engineering and Software product line engineering.

== Life and work ==
Pohl studied computer science from 1984 to 1988 at the Karlsruhe University of Applied Sciences and till 1989 Information Science at the University of Konstanz. He received his PhD in 1995 and habilitation in 1999 from RWTH Aachen. In addition, he worked for several years as a software architect, software developer and consultant.

Klaus Pohl is director of paluno – The Ruhr Institute for Software Technology, and full professor for Software Systems Engineering at the Institute for Computer Science and Business Information Systems (ICB) at the University of Duisburg-Essen. He is associate professor of the University of Limerick, Ireland.

From 2005 to 2007 he was the founding director of Lero – The Irish Software Engineering Research Centre.

He is also founding member of IREB e.V. (International Requirements Engineering Boards). IREB is a Non-Profit-Organisation and provider of CPRE (Certified Professional for Requirements Engineering). More than 22,000 people in more than 59 countries have passed the CPRE Foundation Level.

Pohl received several awards including the Fellow award of the German Informatics Society (GI - Gesellschaft für Informatik e.V.) in 2014.

His research interests focus on digital, connected systems, requirements engineering, service-based systems and software product line engineering.

== Selected publications ==
Pohl is author of several monographs and author, co-author and editor of over 250 peer-reviewed publications

Monographs

- Klaus Pohl and Chris Rupp: Requirements Engineering Fundamentals: A Study Guide for the Certified Professional for Requirement Engineering, Rocky Nook, 2. Edition 2015; German Edition: dpunkt.verlag. 4. Edition 2015; Portuguese Edition.
- Klaus Pohl: Requirements Engineering: Fundamentals, Principles, and Techniques, Springer, 2010; German Edition: dpunkt.verlag. 2. Edition 2008; Chinese Edition: 2012.
- Klaus Pohl, Günter Böckle, and Frank Van Der Linden (eds.): Software product line engineering: Foundations, Principles, and Techniques. Springer, Berlin, Heidelberg, New York 2005; Japanese Edition: 2009; Chinese Edition: 2013.
- Klaus Pohl: Process-centered Requirements Engineering, Advanced Software Development Series, Research Studies Press Ltd, Taunton Somerset, England, 1996.

Selected Proceedings

- David Notkin, Betty H.C. Cheng and Klaus Pohl (eds.): Proceedings of the 35th International Conference on Software Engineering (ICSE '13), IEEE/ACM, 2013.
- Birgit Geppert and Klaus Pohl (eds.): Proceedings of the 12th International Software Product Line Conference (SPLC 2008), Los Alamitos, IEEE, 2008.
- Petri Mähönen, Klaus Pohl and Thierry Priol (eds.): Towards a Service-Based Internet. Proceedings of the 1st European Conference ServiceWave 2008, Volume 5377 of Lecture Notes in Computer Science, Berlin, Heidelberg, Springer, 2008.
- Klaus Pohl, Patrick Heymans, Kyo-C. Kang and Andreas Metzger (eds.): Proceedings of the 1st International Workshop on Variability Modelling of Software-Intensive Systems (VaMoS 2007), Volume 1 of Technical Report, Lero Int. Science Centre, University of Limerick, 2007.
- Eric Dubois and Klaus Pohl (eds.): Proceedings of the 18th International Conference on Advanced Information Systems Engineering (CAiSE 2006), Volume 4001 of Lecture Notes in Computer Science, Berlin, Heidelberg, Springer, 2006.
- J. Henk Obbink and Klaus Pohl (eds.):Proceedings of the 9th International Conference on Software Product Line (SPLC 2005), Volume 3714 of Lecture Notes in Computer Science, Berlin, Heidelberg, Springer, 2005.
- Eric Dubois and Klaus Pohl (eds.): Proceedings of the 10th Anniversary IEEE Joint International Conference on Requirements Engineering (RE 2002), Los Alamitos, IEEE, 2002.
- Matthias Jarke, Klaus Pasedach and Klaus Pohl (eds.): Proceedings der Informatik '97, Informatik als Innovationsmotor: 27. Jahrestagung der Gesellschaft für Informatik Informatik Aktuell, Berlin, Heidelberg, Springer, 1997.
- Klaus Pohl, Gernot Starke and Peters Peter (eds.): Proceedings of the 1st International Workshop on Requirements Engineering: Foundation of Software Quality (REFSQ'94), Volume 6 of Aachener Beiträge zur Informatik, Aachen, Verlag der Augustinus Buchhandlung, 1994.
