= Friedrich Christian Günther =

German physician, mayor, and ornithologist

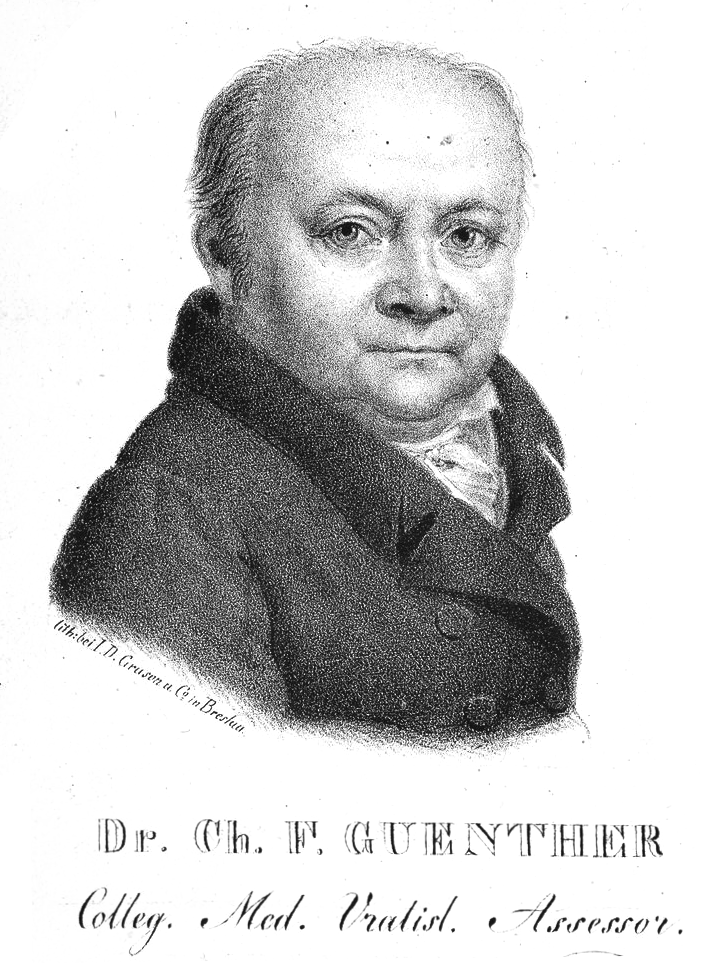
- Born: April 22, 1726; Kahla, Germany
- Died: April 25, 1774 (aged 48); Kahla, Germany
- Occupations: physician; judge; mayor

Friedrich Christian Günther (April 22, 1726 – April 25, 1774) was a German physician, mayor for the city of Kahla, a natural history collector and an ornithologist. He contributed text to a book on the nests and eggs of birds.

== Life and work ==
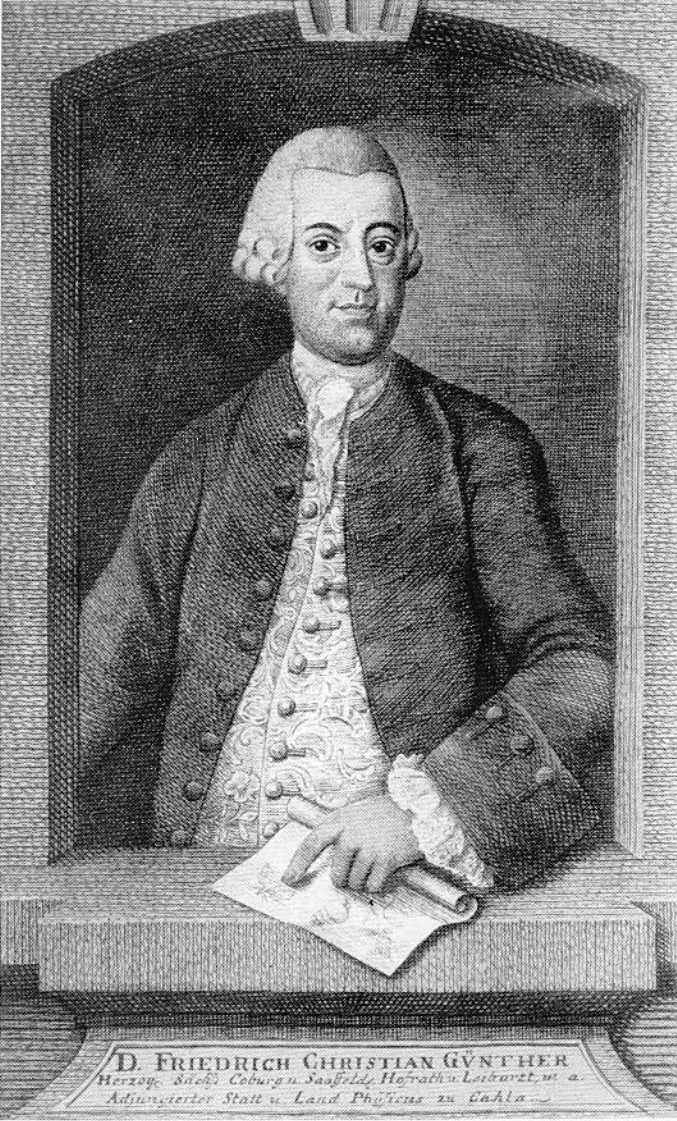

Günther was born in Kahla near Jena to pastor Johann Kaspar (1681–1755) and Katherine Margarethe née Mecke (1690–1743). Johann Kaspar moved to Kahla in 1723 from Altenburg. They had a son, theologian Carl Jacob (born 1717), and two daughters, Charlotta Wilhelmina (born 1719) and Henriette Friderica (born 1722), before the birth of Friedrich Christian. He studied at the public school in Kahla, where he was taught by Christian Petzold and also by a private tutor named H. Kebock. He was also influenced by physician Georg Wilhelm Beyer, who took him on walks in nature. This led to his studying medicine in Jena from 1744 to 1747. Studies were interrupted when his father suffered a stroke in 1746, during which time Günther returned home and worked on his thesis. His doctoral thesis, Dissertatio inauguralis medica de scorbuto eiusque medela, was on scurvy and its treatment under Hilscher. He returned home and became a physician even before the formal doctorate was received. This led to some trouble, but he eventually overcame the issue. In 1752 he joined the city council, becoming a judge and deputy mayor (1761) during the Seven Years' War. In 1767–68 he served as a mayor. From his childhood, he collected natural history specimens and was a friend of Johann Ernst Immanuel Walch (1725–1778), who used his collections for lectures. He was among the first to collect a specimen of the Egyptian vulture from Thuringia. He also wrote on the breeding of siskins in Thuringia. Günther translated the work of Scopoli, Annus historico – naturalis, publishing it in 1770 and adding his own observations on birds from Thuringia. He also contributed to the text of Adam Ludwig Wirsing (1734–1798) on the nests and eggs of birds, which was published only in 1772. His was among the first ornithological works that looked at the life of birds in their habitats.

Günther took a special interest in abnormal plumages, both albinistic and melanistic. He accepted Neur's theory on the formation of colour by optical effects but added his hypothesis that fluids filled the invisible channels within feathers, leading to the coloration. He believed that young birds born from aged birds failed to inherit the "sap" needed to color the feathers.

Günther married Eleonora Sophia, daughter of lawyer Trautmann, in 1761; they had four children, two of whom died young. Günther suffered from pulmonary tuberculosis, possibly acquired from his patients, and it became acute in 1773. He retired in 1774 and died in Kahla. His collections included minerals, fossils, animals, and especially stuffed birds. They have not been traced, but it has been speculated that they may have gone into the collections of Walch and then into those of the University of Jena. His grave was probably destroyed in 1952–53.
