= Günther von Scheven =

German sculptor (1908–1942)

- Born: 17 April 1908; Krefeld, German Empire
- Died: 21 March 1942 (aged 33); Ukrainian SSR

Günther von Scheven (17 April 1908 – 21 March 1942) was a German sculptor. His work was part of the sculpture event in the art competition at the 1936 Summer Olympics; a medal he designed received an honorary mention. He was killed in action in Ukraine during the Second World War.

He studied philosophy in Heidelberg and Berlin, but also did a craft training and studied sculpture. He was a close friend of Georg Kolbe, who published his biography in 1944. His gravesite remains unknown.
