= Briggs Peak =

Briggs Peak (68°59′S 66°42′W) is an isolated, conical mountain, 1,120 metres (3,670 ft) high, on the northeast side of the Wordie Ice Shelf, Antarctic Peninsula. It was first roughly surveyed by the British Graham Land Expedition, 1936–37, and photographed by the Ronne Antarctic Research Expedition, November 1947 (trimetrogon air photography). It was surveyed from the ground by the Falkland Islands Dependencies Survey in 1949 and 1958, and named by the UK Antarctic Place-Names Committee after Henry Briggs, the English mathematician who, with John Napier, was responsible for the invention of logarithms, about 1614.
