= Geoff Weigand =

Australian rock climber and road cyclist

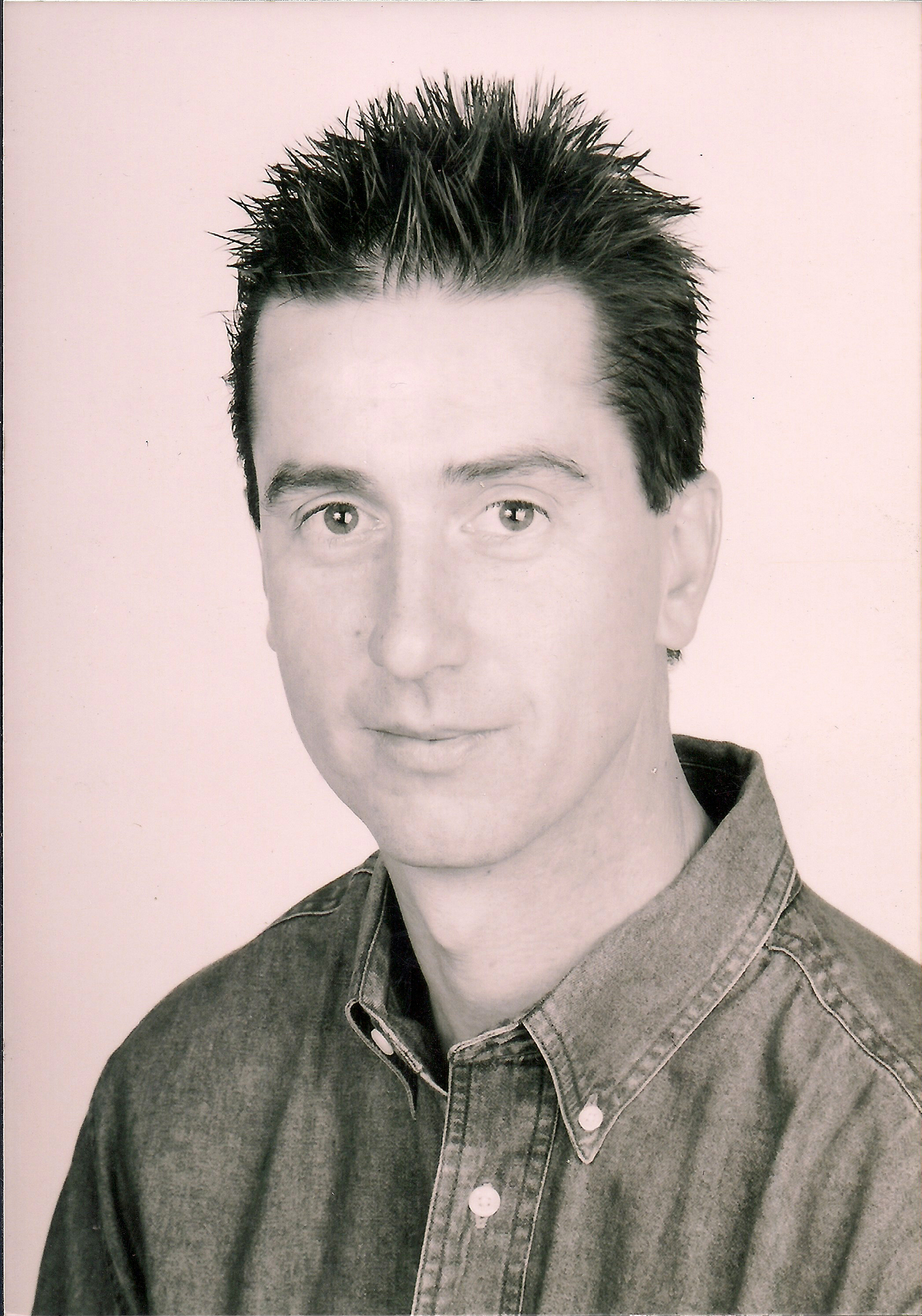

Personal information
- Born: 1964 (age 61–62) Sydney, Australia
- Occupations: Rock climber and climbing coach

Climbing career
- Type of climber: Traditional climbing; Sport climbing; Free solo climbing

Geoff Weigand (born 1964 in Sydney, Australia) is an Australian rock climber and road cyclist.

== Climbing career ==
In 1981, at the age of 16, he came to prominence as one of the leading rock climbers in Australia with the onsight ascent of Toyland, 25, considered by most to be the hardest climb in New South Wales (NSW) at the time. Weigand added numerous first free ascents in Australia. Some are at Bombo Quarry, NSW, he redpointed Hangman (27)., Krondorf Theft (25), and Abstractions (25). At Cosmic County, with Aesthetic Images (25), Crosswords (24), Highlights (24), Fading Light (24), Blackboard (24) and Letters to the Editor (25) - all developed in December 1981. He also repeated the best and hardest of his contemporaries' routes (at the time) including ascent of Hollow Men (26). While at Mt. Piddington, he established the first of its difficulty, Social Climbing (26) He also free solo climbed The Janicepts (22) at Mt. Victoria, and Exhibition Wall (21) at Mt. York. He was the subject of a "60 Minutes" (Australia) climbing story on free soloing filmed at Cosmic County and Blue Mountains. In this story the anchorman posits "Is this Sport or Madness?" Weigand is quoted as saying "It's both and neither. It's madness to the everyday person. I'm not the everyday person." At Mt. Arapiles in Australia he redpointed No Exit (26) while still in high school. In February 1986 he made the first free ascent of Shimmering, the first route at the grade 28 in New South Wales.

In Joshua Tree, he free soloed, and onsight, each of the Ski Tracks (5.10/5.11) then the crack climbing route, Acid Crack 5.13a (7c+). In Yosemite Valley, with fellow Aussie Kim Carrigan, they did the first continuous—no falls—free ascent of Rostrum 5.12 (7b/+). At the Cookie Cliffs, they climbed Americas Cup 5.12c (7b+), so named to commemorate the winning of the yacht race series by Australia over the U.S.A. for the first time.

At Smith Rock, in Oregon, he arrived in early summer '85 with Johnny Woodward and Kim Carrigan with the local core of Alan Watts, Chris Grover, and Brooke Sandhal. He made the first 1-day ascent of Chain Reaction 5.12c (7b+), and Latest Rage 5.12 (7b/+). He and Woodward also teamed up for the 2nd ascent of the classic Heinous Cling 5.12c (7b+), and a no falls ascent of Split images 5.12d (7c). Weigand did the 1st repeat of Darkness at Noon 5.13a (7c+)—all were routes developed by Alan Watts and it supported his development of Smith Rocks as the leading American sport climbing area.

Weigand was profiled in Rock magazine's Jan-Jun 1989 issue noted as "currently at the top of the Australian rockclimbing hit parade" (Chris Baxter, Managing Editor)

He participated in the 1992 Masters competition in Chambery, France as an early competition climbing event held one-week prior to the Olympic games in France's bid to get rock climbing entered as an Olympic sport for the 1998 Seoul, Korean summer games. He placed 19th in the lead climbing event and 5th in the speed climbing event.

In 1992, at the China Wall in Logan Canyon, UT he made the first free ascnet of the sport-climbing route, Blackout 8b+ (5.14a), an ascent that Boone Speed called: "The grade of the route is irrelevant, insignificant compared to the pure intensity of the performance. What matters is that Geoff punched it past his personal limits, and, in the process, inspired us to do the same. I wish everyone luck in the search for their own 'Black Out'."

== Notable ascents ==
=== First free ascents ===
- Hangman (27) 1st Ascent Bombo Quarry (1982), NSW
- Slinkin Leopard (28) - (potentially equal to any route at the time), First Ascent
- Power Corruption and Lies (27), Mt. Arapiles
- Cherry Boys (27), Grampians, First Ascent
- Model Phantom (27), First Ascent, Mt. Arapiles
- Security Jerks (27), First Ascent (1984)
- Yesterday Direct (28), First Ascent
- Microcosm (27), Wolgan Valley NSW, first free ascent
- Jet Lag (29) 1st Ascent – Arapiles (1984)
- Straight Outta Compton (29) 1st Ascent – Arapiles (1985)
- Slit Your Wrists (5.13b/29) 1st Ascent Smith Rock
- Villain (5.14a) 1st Ascent {1990} - Smith Rock
- Hurrikan (5.13b/c) 1st Ascent {1985} - Frankenjura, Germany (1985)
- Time's Up (5.13a/28), 1st Ascent - Smith Rock
- The Ashes (7c+), Kilnsey Crag, First Ascent described in High magazine, August issue 1989
- Churning in the Ozone (5.13b) 1st Ascent – Smith Rock
- Body Count (5.13+) 1st Ascent (1991) - AF Canyon
- Cop Killer (5.13d) 1st Ascent - AF Canyon
- Blackout (5.14a) 1st Ascent {1992} - Logan Canyon
- Trench Warfare (5.13c) 1st Ascent {1992}- Logan Canyon
- The Love Boat (5.13d) 1st Ascent - AF Canyon
- You're Terminated (31), Mt. Arapiles, First Ascent
- Aesthetic Images (25) 1st Ascent - Cosmic County
- Letters To the Editor (25) 1st Ascent - Cosmic County
- Shimmering (28) 1st Ascent - Cosmic County
- Trilobite (26) 1st Ascent - Cosmic County
- Dog Logic (25), First Ascent, Dog Wall, Red Rocks, NV,
- No Dogs Allowed (5.12b/26), First Ascent, Dog Wall, Red Rocks, NV,
- The Deep West (27), First Ascent, Dog Wall, Red Rocks, NV,
- The Boschton Marathon (27), First Ascent, Dog Wall, Red Rocks, NV,
- Next to Nothing (26) 1st Ascent – Mt York
- Crosswords (24) 1st Ascent – Cosmic County
- Fading Light (24),1st Ascent – Cosmic County,
- Paralyzed (24) 1st Ascent – Cosmic County
- Kid Dynamo (22) 1st Ascent - Cosmic County
- Americas Cup (5.12c)1st Ascent Cookie Cliff - Yosemite (w/ K. Carrigan)(1985)
- White Wedding (5.14a), 1989, Smith Rock, one of only 3 climbs of that grade in U.S.A. at time of establishing route, first time an Australian has broken the 5.14 barrier. Weigand rates as 32/33 in Australian grading

=== First ascents done as free solo and onsight ===
- Short and Sharp (25), Arapiles, solo onsight, First Ascent
- Herbs and Spices (24 -now 23), Arapiles, onsight, First Ascent (solo)

=== First ascents done as free solo ascents ===
- The Janicepts (22) 1st solo, Onsight - Mt Piddington Blue Mountains – John Ewbank’s, original Hardest Route in Australia

=== Multi-pitch climbing first ascents ===
- The Rostrum (V 5.12) 1st Free Ascent – Yosemite (1985)(w/K. Carrigan)
- The Shadow (V 5.13b) 1st Ascent – Squamish Chief (1988) (w/Peter Croft)

=== Other ascents ===
- India (29), 4th Ascent
- 1st onsight ascent of Grace (26), Mitchells Ridge
- White Trash (25), solo
- Serpentine (31), Mt. Stapylton, second ascent
- Superdirectissima (31, 32), Malham Cove, Second ascent

== Competition climbing events ==
- 1988: Snowbird International, UT, the first climber in the 1st International climbing event in the U.S., 8th Place
- 1989: Snowbird World Cup, UT, 9th place
- 1991: Phoenix 9th Annual Bouldering (the first bouldering contest to receive ASCF sanctioning), 3rd place
- 1991: Hueco Tanks Rock Rodeo, TX - 1st place, tied with Dale Goddard
- 1992: Chambery Rockmaster, FRA, 19th difficulty, 5th speed - France's attempt to have climbing be an Olympic sport for 1998 Seoul games
