= Sibylle Günter =

German plasma physicist (born 1964)

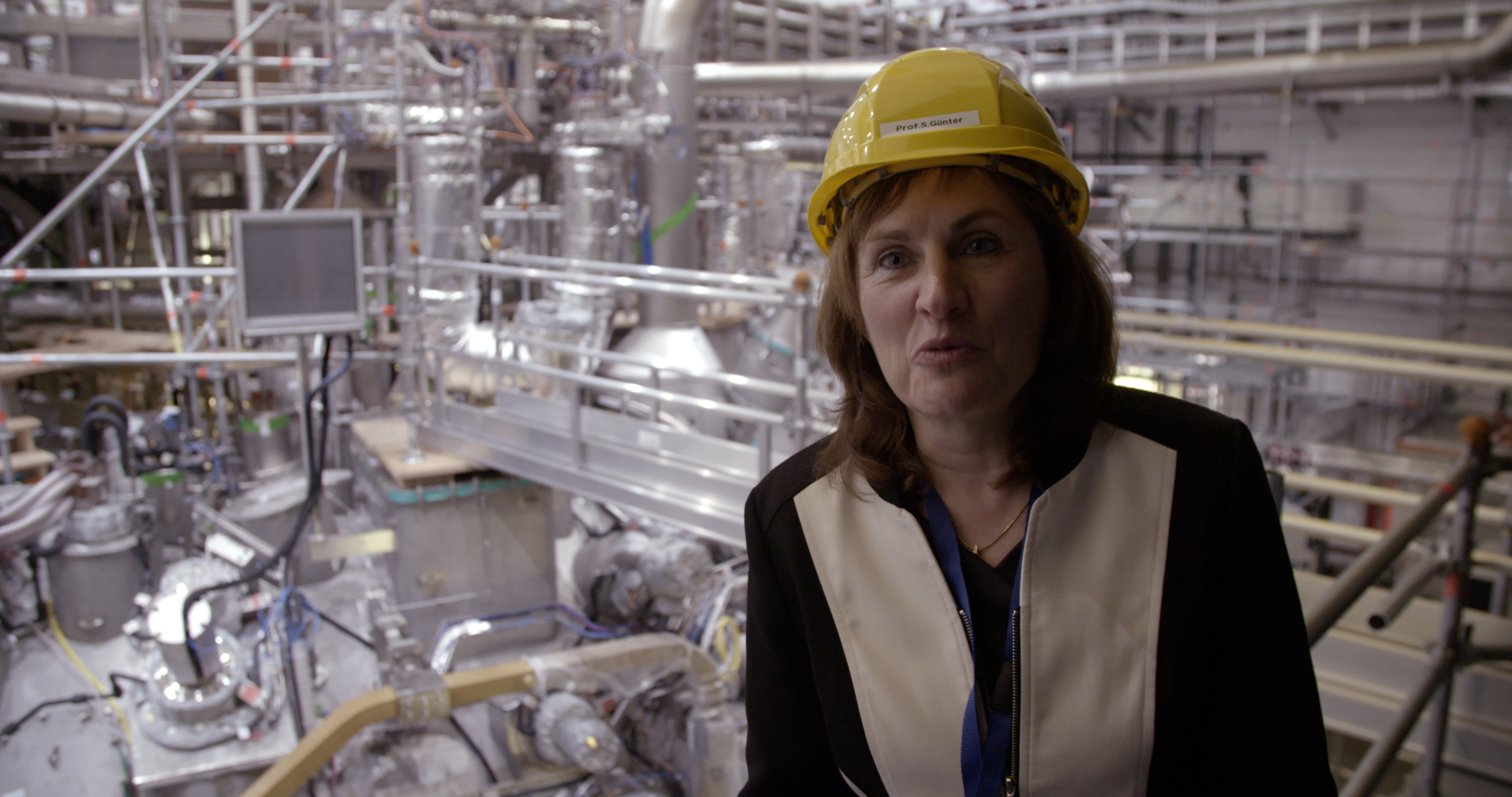
- Sibylle Günter at Wendelstein 7-X in 2017
- Born: 20 April 1964 (age 62); Rostock, East Germany
- Education: University of Rostock
- Known for: tokamak plasmas
- Scientific career
- Workplaces: NIST; Max Planck Institute for Plasma Physics
- Thesis: Zur Berechnung der Profile von Wasserstofflinien in dichten Plasmen (1990)
- Doctoral advisor: Gerd Röpke

Sibylle Günter (born 20 April 1964) is a German theoretical physicist researching tokamak plasmas. Since February 2011, she has headed the Max Planck Institute for Plasma Physics. In October 2015, she was elected a member of the Academia Europaea in recognition of her contribution to research.

== Biography ==
Born in Rostock, Günter matriculated from high school in 1982. She went on to study physics at the University of Rostock where she graduated in 1987 and earned a doctorate in 1990 with a dissertation on radiation from dense plasmas. Her thesis advisor was Gerd Röpke. After working as a research associate at the university's Department of Theoretical Physics, she completed her habilitation in 1996. Her work in Rostock was complemented by periods in the United States at the University of Maryland and at the National Institute of Standards and Technology.

In 1996, she joined the Tokamak Physics division of the Max Planck Institute for Plasma Physics (IPP) in Garching near Munich. In 2000, she was appointed director of the institute and head of Tokamak Physics coordinating research on the principles of a fusion plant designed to produce energy resulting from the fusion of light ions. In 2011, she became IPP's scientific director.

In October 2015, in view of her outstanding contribution to research, the Academia Europaea's board elected Günter a member of the Academy.

== Selected publications ==
- Günter, S.; Wolf, R. C.; Leuterer, F.; Gruber, O.; Kaufmann, M.; et al. (2000-04-03). "Simultaneous Attainment of High Electron and Ion Temperatures in Discharges with Internal Transport Barriers in ASDEX Upgrade". Physical Review Letters. 84 (14). American Physical Society (APS): 3097–3100. Bibcode:2000PhRvL..84.3097G. doi:10.1103/physrevlett.84.3097. ISSN 0031-9007. PMID 11019021.
- Günter, S.; Gude, A.; Maraschek, M.; Sesnic, S.; Zohm, H.; Howell, D. F. (2001-12-10). "High-Confinement Regime at High β_{N} Values Due to a Changed Behavior of the Neoclassical Tearing Modes". Physical Review Letters. 87 (27) 275001. American Physical Society (APS). Bibcode:2001PhRvL..87A5001A. doi:10.1103/physrevlett.87.275001. ISSN 0031-9007. PMID 11800885.
- Günter, S; Conway, G; daGraça, S; Fahrbach, H.-U; Forest, C; et al. (2007-07-24). "Interaction of energetic particles with large and small scale instabilities". Nuclear Fusion. 47 (8). IOP Publishing: 920–928. Bibcode:2007NucFu..47..920G. doi:10.1088/0029-5515/47/8/025. hdl:11858/00-001M-0000-0027-0721-F. ISSN 0029-5515. S2CID 21678885.
- Günter, S; Lauber, Ph; Merkel, P; Sempf, M; Strumberger, E; Tekle, D; Lackner, K (2008-11-03). "Three-dimensional effects in tokamaks". Plasma Physics and Controlled Fusion. 50 (12) 124004. IOP Publishing. Bibcode:2008PPCF...50l4004G. doi:10.1088/0741-3335/50/12/124004. hdl:11858/00-001M-0000-0027-01BC-9. ISSN 0741-3335. S2CID 120813395.
- Lauber, Ph.; Günter, S. (2008-06-26). "Damping and drive of low-frequency modes in tokamak plasmas". Nuclear Fusion. 48 (8) 084002. IOP Publishing. Bibcode:2008NucFu..48h4002L. doi:10.1088/0029-5515/48/8/084002. hdl:11858/00-001M-0000-0026-FF57-9. ISSN 0029-5515. S2CID 54050208.

== Awards ==
Günter has received the following awards:

- 2013: Order of Merit of the Federal Republic of Germany
- 2015: Member of the German Academy of Science and Engineering
- 2015: Member of the Academia Europaea
- 2020: Member of the German Academy of Sciences Leopoldina
