= Günter Burg =

German dermatologist

Günter Burg (born 5 February 1941) is a German dermatologist. Born in Mayen, Germany, he holds German and Swiss citizenship. He has been married to Dr. Doris Burg-Nicklas, a neurologist, since 1968. They have two sons: Andreas (b. 1975) and Thomas (b. 1977).

== Professional career ==
Günter Burg finished high school in 1960 at the Max von Laue-Highschool in Koblenz, Rhineland-Palatinate. He completed his studies of medicine in Bonn and Marburg (graduation 1966; doctorate 1968 summa cum laude). In Marburg, Homburg/Saar and Saarbrücken he completed his postdoctoral training in pediatrics, pathology, internal medicine, surgery, gynecology, obstetrics, and dermatology. In 1969, he has made his transit to Munich to the Department of Dermatology of LMU Munich (Chairman Prof. Otto Braun-Falco). Furthermore, in 1970 he has taken a position as Research Fellowship at the Skin Cancer Unit of the New York University. In 1975, he gained habilitation in Munich ("Kutane Lymphome|Cutaneous Lymphomas)". In 1988, Burg made his appointments for Chairmanships at the Departments of Dermatology in Berlin, Mainz and Würzburg. From 1988 until 1991 he was a Chairman of the Department of Dermatology, University of Würzburg. Then, in 1991 he made an appointment at the Department of Dermatology, Venerology, and Allergology of the University Zürich^{,}^{,} From 1998 until 1999 he was Vice dean, and from 2000 until 2004 he got a position as Dean of the Medical Faculty of Zürich. In 2006 Burg retired.

=== Areas of interest ===
Burg has several areas of interest, and the most important ones are the following: clinical and experimental dermatology, dermato-oncology (skin cancer), especially cutaneous lymphomas and melanoma, dermatopathology and immunohistochemistry, telemedicine and E-Learning.

Other professional areas of interest include allergology and immune status, porphyrias, skin manifestations of neurologic diseases, skin culturing, Moulages, History of Dermatology.

=== Scientific achievements ===
Burgs's scientific achievements include comprehensive revision of the WHO classification of cutaneous lymphomas on the basis of morphologic, cytochemical, immunologic, and molecular biologic findings. Then, pattern-diagnostic of lymphoproliferative skin infiltrates (T- and B-cell pattern), and Characterization of CD 30-positive infiltrates in lymphomatoid papulosis and related disorders (Lugano 1984).

=== Organisational achievements ===
Burg's organisational achievements include:

- Implementation of MOHS Micrographic Surgery in Europe (Munich 1971)
- Initiation or substantial contributions in founding of several societies and working groups:
  - Arbeitsgemeinschaft Dermatologische Onkologie (ADO)
  - EORTC Cutaneous Lymphoma Group (1975)
  - International Society for Cutaneous Lymphomas (ISCL) (1991)
  - Schweizer Gesellschaft für Telemedizin und e-Health (2001)
  - Verein für Hautkrebsforschung (2004)
  - International Community for e-Health and Telehealth (ICEHAT) (2018)

== Awards (selection) ==
- Member of the LEOPOLDINA (German Academy of Scientists) (1998)
- Doctor honoris causa of the Medical University of Sofia (2005)
- Certificate of Appreciation of the International League of Dermatologic Societies (ILDS) 2007
- Braun-Falco-Medal 2011
- Pro Meritis Award of the EDF 2017
- Hebra-Price 2020

== Memberships ==
Burg is a member of 25 dermatologic, medical and scientific societies. He has received an honorary or corresponding membership of 13 national or international societies.

== Social Activities ==
Burg's social activities began with a Telemedical pilot project in 1998 In Tanzania (Moshi) "Weltweit hautnah|worldwide-close". Since 1999, he has partnered with Strategic Partnership for Nepal (STRAPAL).

== Publications ==
Burg has published numerous papers and book chapters. In fact, he has published 456 original papers, 146 review papers, and 139 book chapters.

=== Books (selection) ===
- Burg, G.; Braun-Falco, O. (1983) Cutaneous Lymphomas, Pseudolymphomas and Related Disorders, Springer.
- Burg, G.; Kunze, J.; Pongratz. D.; Scheurlen, Pg.; Schinzel, A.; Spranger, J. (1990) Leiber: Die klinischen Syndrome. Syndrome, Sequenzen und Symptomenkomplexe. - 7. Aufl. Hrsg.:, Urban & Schwarzenberg, Munich, Vienna, Baltimore.
- Burg, G., (1993) Das Melanom, Piper.
- Burg, G.; et al. 2001 (Vol. I) & 2006 (Vol. II), Cutaneous Lymphomas: Unusual Cases, Steinkopff.
- Burg, G., (2003), Telemedicine and Teledermatology, Karger.
- Burg, G.; Kempf, W.; Dekker, M., (2005), Cutaneous Lymphomas, Francis & Taylor.
- Burg, G.; Weedon, D.; Sarasin, A., (2006), WHO Books: Tumors of the Skin, IARC France.
- Burg, G.; Geiges, M., (2001), Die Haut, in der wir leben, Rüffer & Rub Sachbuchverlag.
- Burg, G.; Geiges, M., (2006), Rundum Haut, Rüffer & Rub Sachbuchverlag.
- Burg, G.; et al., (2015, 2019, 2021), Clinical Dermatopathology Vol.I (Inflammatory); Vol.II (Tumors); Vol.III (Infections), Wiley Publisher, Oxford.
- Burg, G.; Geiges, M.; Hug, C., (2022), Das Inkarnat/Carnation. DermARTologie/DermARTology. Haut und Kunst/Skin and Art, Springer Nature.

=== Web-Based Media ===
- Dermatology Online with Interactive Technology (DOIT), a multilingual (8) interactive e-Learning platform for medical students (revisions: 2002, 2004, 2008, 2012, 2016, 2021) (Founding Editor)
- Hypertext atlas of dermatopathology (Co-Editor)

=== Original-Publications (selection) ===
- Burg, G.; Braun-Falco, O., (1975), Classification and Differentiation of Cutaneous Lymphomas. Enzyme-cytochemical and immunocytological studies. Br J Dermatol 93: 597–599, doi:10.1111/j.1365-2133.1975.tb02256.x
- Burg, G.; Robins, P., (1972). Chemochirurgie. Chirurgische Entfernung chemisch fixierten Tumorgewebes mit mikroskopischer Kontrolle. Hautarzt 23: 16-20
- Burg, G.; Rodt, H.; Grosse-wilde, H.; Braun-Falco, O., (1978). Surface markers and mitogen response of cells harvested from cutaneous infiltrates in mycosis fungoides and Sézary's syndrome. J Invest Derm 70: 257–259, doi:10.1111/1523-1747.ep12541400
- Przybilla, B.; Burg, G.; Thieme, Ch., (1983). Evaluation of the immune status in vivo by the 2,4-dinitro-1-chlorobenzene contact allergy time (DNCB-CAT). Dermatologica 167:1-5, doi:10.1159/000249735
- Kaudewitz, P.; Stein, H.; Burg, G.; Mason, M.; Braun-Falco, O., (1984, Juni). Detection of Sternberg-Reed- and Hodgkin cell specific antigen on atypical cells in lymphomatoid papulosis. 2nd Internat. Conference on Malignant Lymphoma. Lugano, 13.-16.
- Dummer, R.; Schäfer, E.; Eilles, C.; Börner, W.; Burg, G., (1991). Lymphokine-activated killer-cell traffic in metastatic melanoma. Lancet 338:456-457, doi:10.1016/0140-6736(91)91089-d
- Burg, G.; Dummer, R.; Wilhelm, M.; Nestle, F.; Ott, Mm.; Feller, A.; Hefner, H.; Lanz, U.; Schwinn. A.; Wiede, J. (1991). A Subcutaneous Delta-Positive T-Cell Lymphoma That Produces Interferon Gamma. N. Engl J Med 325:1078-1081, doi:10.1056/NEJM199110103251506
- Bräuninger, A.; Hansmann, M-l.; Strickler, Jg.; Dummer, R.; Burg, G.; Rajewsky, K.; Küppers, R., (1999). Identification of common germinal-center B-cell precursors in two patients with both Hodgkin's disease and non-Hodgkin's lymphoma. N. Engl J. Med. 340: 1239 – 1247, doi:10.1056/nejm199904223401604
- Hess Schmid, M.; Bird, P.; Dummer, R.; Kempf, W.; Burg, G., (1999). Tumor Burden Index as a Prognostic Tool for Cutaneous T-Cell Lymphoma. Arch Dermatol 135: 1204 – 1208, doi:10.1001/archderm.135.10.1204
- Burg, G.; Dummer, R.; Häffner, A.; Kempf, W.; Kadin, M., (2001). From Inflammation to Neoplasia. Mycosis fungoides evolve from reactive inflammatory conditions (Lymphoid Infiltrates) transforming into neoplastic plaques and tumors. Arch Dermatol 137: 949 – 952
- Heinzerling, L.; Dummer, R.; Pavlovic, J.; Schultz, J.; Burg, G.; Moelling, K., (2002). Tumor regression of human and murine melanoma after intratumoral injection of IL-12-encoding plasmid DNA in mice. Experimental Dermatology 2002: 11: 232–240, doi:10.1034/j.1600-0625.2001.110306.x
- Burg, G.; Kempf, W.; Kazakov, Dv.; Dummer, R.; Frosch, Pj.; Lange-Ionescu, S.; Nishikawa, T.; Kadin, Me., (2003). Pyogenic lymphoma of the skin: a peculiar variant of primary cutaneous neutrophil-rich CD30+ anaplastic large-cell lymphoma. Br J Dermatol 148: 580–586, doi:10.1046/j.1365-2133.2003.05248.x
- Burg, G.; Kempf, W.; Cozzio, A.; et al. (2005). WHO/EORTC classification of cutaneous lymphomas 2005: histological and molecular aspects. Journal of Cutaneous Pathology 32: 647–674, doi:10.1111/j.0303-6987.2005.00495.x
- Willemze, R.; Jaffe, E.S.; Burg, G.; et al. (2005). WHO-EORTC classification for cutaneous lymphomas. Blood 105(10): 3768–85, doi:10.1182/blood-2004-09-3502
- Burg, G.; Finlay, A., (2016). Web_Based Education. J Eur Acad Dermatol Venereol 30(12): e226-e227, doi:10.1111/jdv.13560
- Burg, G., (2020). Teledermatology – its place in modern skin healthcare worldwide. J Eur Acad Dermatol Venereol 34: 670–671, doi:10.1111/jdv.16318
