= Joachim Günther (politician, born 1948) =

German politician

Member of the Bundestag
- In office 20 December 1990 – 22 October 2013

Personal details
- Born: 22 October 1948 Syrau
- Party: FDP

Joachim Günther (born 22 October 1948) was a German politician of the Free Democratic Party (FDP) and former member of the German Bundestag.

== Life ==
Günther was a member of the German Bundestag from 1990 to 2013. Here he was for a short time from 15 to 28 January 1991 parliamentary managing director of the FDP parliamentary group. Joachim Günther always entered the Bundestag via the Saxony state list. His constituency is Vogtland - Plauen.

== Literature ==
Herbst, Ludolf; Jahn, Bruno (2002). Vierhaus, Rudolf (ed.). Biographisches Handbuch der Mitglieder des Deutschen Bundestages. 1949–2002 [Biographical Handbook of the Members of the German Bundestag. 1949–2002] (in German). München: De Gruyter - De Gruyter Saur. p. 1715. ISBN 978-3-11-184511-1.
