= Günter Stephan =

Günter Stephan is the name of:

- Günter Stephan (footballer) (1912–1995), German footballer
- Günter Stephan (trade unionist) (1922–2012), German trade union leader
