= Günter Riesen =

German Nazi politician

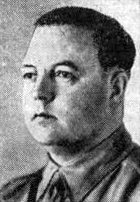

Günther Karl Edgar Wolfgang Riesen (23 September 1892 – 5 October 1951) was a German Nazi politician who served as Mayor of Cologne.

== Origin, education, occupation ==
Riesen was born in Breslau, German Empire (now Wrocław, Poland). His father was the vice president of the Deutsche Reichsbahn (German Imperial Railways) and was entitled Geheimrat. Günter Riesen served in the First World War and studied from 1919 to 1924 political economy and economics in Cologne. Riesen graduated in 1922. Günter Riesen was married to a daughter of the wealthy Cologne manufacturer Otto Brügelmann.

The wife of Riesen, Grete, was an early member of the Nazi party in Cologne. Riesen himself joined the party in 1932. Gauleiter Josef Grohé therefore found Riesen suitable for a high position after the seizure.

== Nazi period ==
After the local elections in Cologne on 12 March 1933, the Nazi party and the Kampffront Schwarz-Weiß-Rot had won the absolute majority of the city councilors only because the votes of the communists were declared invalid. The Gauleiter Josef Grohé declared Konrad Adenauer deposed and installed Günter Riesen as acting mayor. On 4 April 1933, official disciplinary proceedings against Adenauer were initiated, which was concluded on 4 June 1934. Adenauer was cleared of all charges.

Riesen was an antisemite. Riesen lost his position in 1936 because of a devise pass. However, he was appointed in 1938 Chief Executive of the Merseburg district, and in 1942 he received a high position in Wrocław. He was dismissed in 1945 by the Allies. He lost his pension entitlement because he was not granted denazification.

Riesen died in Ruppichteroth on 5 October 1951.

== Literature ==
- Walther Killy, Rudolf Vierhaus: Deutsche Biographische Enzyklopädie. K.G. Saur Verlag, Munich 1998, ISBN 3-598-23168-7.
- Literature by and about Günter Riesen in the German National Library catalogue.
