= Günter Thorhauer =

German footballer (1931–2007)

Personal information
- Full name: Günter Thorhauer
- Date of birth: 8 November 1931
- Place of birth: Germany
- Date of death: 27 April 2007 (aged 75)
- Place of death: Germany
- Position: Outside forward

Youth career
- Stahl Magdeburg

Senior career*
Years	Team	Apps	(Gls)
–1952	Motor Mitte Magdeburg		
1952–1953	SG Volkspolizei Dresden	15	(3)

International career
1952	East Germany	1	(0)
- * Club domestic league appearances and goals

Günter Thorhauer (8 November 1931 – 27 April 2007) was a football player who played in the first international match of East Germany.

Thorhauer's playing career was short. He began playing in the youth teams of BSG Stahl Magdeburg, a club that was to become 1. FC Magdeburg later. When he was called up to the senior team, the club had been renamed Motor Mitte Magdeburg and played in the second-tier DDR-Liga. In the 1951–52 season Thorhauer was the club's leading goalscorer with 12 goals.

At the beginning of the following season Thorhauer joined East Germany vice champions and FDGB-Pokal winners Sportgemeinschaft Volkspolizei Dresden. Before playing a single match for his new club, he was called up to the national team and played in their first international, a 0–3 defeat against Poland on 21 September 1952. He played as outside forward on the right side and was the second-youngest player in the squad, after Günter Imhof who was 18 at the time. It remained Thorhauer's only full international.

Thorhauer played in 15 matches for Dresden in the 1952–53 season, scoring three goals and winning the championship with his club. After just one season in the DDR-Oberliga, however, Thorhauer had to end his career due to an injury. Aside from his full international, Thorhauer also played in one match for the youth national team. Thorhauer is the East German international with the fewest Oberliga matches.
