= Ginter =

Ginter is a both a given name and surname of German origin, derived from the name Günther. Notable people with the name include:

- Adam Ginter, Polish sprint canoer
- Jana H. Ginter, American politician
- Keith Ginter, American Major League Baseball player
- Lewis Ginter, American philanthropist and businessman, one of the founders of Allen & Ginter
- Lindsey Ginter, American actor
- Matt Ginter, American Major League Baseball pitcher
- Matthias Ginter, German footballer
- Ginter Gawlik, German-Polish soccer player

== See also ==
- Ginter Building, historic building in Eau Gallie, Florida
- Ginter Park, suburb neighborhood of Richmond, Virginia built on land owned and developed by Lewis Ginter
- Lewis Ginter Botanical Garden, in Richmond, Virginia named after Lewis Ginter
- Günther (disambiguation)
