= SS Smolensk (1944) =

German cargo ship

History
- Name: Günther (1944-45); Empire Galashiels (1945-46); Smolensk (1946-48)
- Owner: Hamburg Südamerikanische Dampfschifffahrts-Gesellschaft A/S & Co KG (1944-45); Ministry of War Transport (1945-46); Soviet Government (1946-48)
- Operator: Hamburg Südamerikanische Dampfschifffahrts-Gesellschaft A/S & Co KG (1944-45); Glen & Co. Ltd (1945-46); Soviet Government (1946-48)
- Port of registry: (Nazi Germany) Hamburg, Germany (1944-45); London, United Kingdom (1945-46); Riga, Soviet Union (1946-76)
- Builder: Neptun AG
- Yard number: 523
- Launched: 4 April 1944
- Completed: 8 July 1944
- Out of service: 1976
- Identification: United Kingdom Official Number 180712 (1945-46); Code Letters GMVM (1945-46); Code Letters UKEA (1946-76); IMO number: 5332525 ( –1976)
- Fate: Scrapped

General characteristics
- Class & type: Hansa A type Cargo ship
- Tonnage: 1,923 GRT, 935 NRT, 3,400 DWT
- Length: 85.22 m (279 ft 7 in)
- Beam: 13.51 m (44 ft 4 in)
- Draught: 6.10 m (20 ft 0 in)
- Depth: 4.50 m (14 ft 9 in)
- Installed power: Compound steam engine, 1,200IHP
- Propulsion: Single screw propeller
- Speed: 10.5 knots (19.4 km/h)

Smolensk (Russian: Смоленск) was a Hansa A Type cargo ship which was built as Günther in 1944 by Neptun AG, Rostock, Germany for Hamburg South Amerika Line. She was seized as a prize of war in 1945, passing to the Ministry of War Transport and renamed Empire Galashiels. She was allocated to the Soviet Union in 1946, she was renamed Smolensk. She served until 1976 when she was scrapped.

== Description ==
The ship was 85.22 m (279 ft 7 in) long, with a beam of 13.51 m (44 ft 4 in). She had a depth of 4.50 m (14 ft 9 in), and a draught of 6.10 m (20 ft 0 in). She was assessed as 1,923 GRT, 935 NRT, 3,400 DWT.

The ship was propelled by a compound steam engine, which had two cylinders of 42 cm (16 9/16 inches) and two cylinders of 90 cm (35 7/16 inches) diameter by 90 cm (35 7/16 inches) stroke. The engine was built by Neptun AG. Rated at 1,200IHP, it drove a single screw propeller and could propel the ship at 10.5 knots (19.4 km/h).

== History ==
Günther was a Hansa A Type cargo ship built in 1944 as yard number 523 by Neptun AG, Rostock, Germany for Hamburg Südamerikanische Dampfschifffahrts-Gesellschaft A/S & Co KG. She was launched on 4 April and completed on 8 July. Her port of registry was Hamburg.

In May 1945, Günther was seized as a prize of war at Rostock. She was passed to the Ministry of War Transport. She was renamed Empire Galashiels. The Code Letters GMVM and United Kingdom Official Number 180604 were allocated. Her port of registry was London and she was operated under the management of Glen & Co. Ltd, Glasgow.

In 1946, Empire Galashiels was allocated to the Soviet Union and was renamed Smolensk. Her port of registry was Riga and the Code Letters UKEA were allocated. She served ports in Estonia and Latvia. With their introduction in the 1960s, Smolensk was allocated the IMO Number 5332525. She served until 1976, when she was scrapped in the Soviet Union.
