= Günter Weigand =

German lawyer

Günter Weigand (24 November 1924 – 2003) was a German self-proclaimed "social lawyer" (Sozialanwalt), economist and amateur prosecutor who became victim of a judicial and psychiatric scandal.

Heinrich Böll and the German expert in criminal law Karl Peters (among others) made it possible, that the Weigand case is known as a miscarriage of justice.

Weigand was born on 24 November 1924 in Allenstein. He died in 2003, likely in Troisdorf.

== Publications (selection) ==
- Die Berechtigung sittlicher Werturteile in den Sozialwissenschaften. Berlin: Duncker & Humblot, 1960. ISBN 9783428016686
- Der Rechtsstaat wird uns nicht geschenkt! Lehren aus der Münsterschen Mordaffäre um den Gewalttod des Rechtsanwalts Blomert vom 25.August 1961. Selbstverlag, 1979, 132 Seiten, ISBN 3922239005

== Secondary literature ==
- Jürgen Kehrer: Schande von Münster: Die Affäre Weigand. Waxmann 1996. ISBN 9783893254699
- Dietmar Klenke: „1.4. Der Blomert-Weigand-Prozess als Imagekatastrophe für Münster.“ In: Schwarz - Münster - Paderborn: Ein antikatholisches Klischeebild. Waxmann 2008. p. 64-67. ISBN 9783830919872
