= Weigandt =

Weigandt is a surname. Notable people with the surname include:

- Bob Weigandt (1914–2008), American basketball player and college coach
- Marcelo Weigandt (born 2000), Argentine professional football player

== See also ==
- Weigandt Barn, historic barn in South Dakota, U.S.
