= Guntur (disambiguation) =

Guntur is a city in the Guntur district of Andhra Pradesh, India.

Guntur may also refer to:

== Related to the city ==
- Guntur district, one of the 13 districts of Andhra Pradesh
  - Guntur revenue division, a revenue division
  - Guntur East mandal, a mandal
  - Guntur West mandal, a mandal
  - Guntur Urban mandal, a former mandal
- Guntur railway division, railway division centred around the city

== People ==
- Guntur Ariyadi (born 1987), Indonesian football defender
- Guntur Bapanaiah, Indian politician
- Guntur Djafril (born 1985), Singaporean football striker
- Guntur Soekarnoputra, son of Indonesian politician Sukarno
- Guntur Triaji (born 1993), Indonesian football midfielder
- Mohamad Guntur Romli, Indonesian writer, activist, and politician
- Andi Muhammad Guntur (born 1990), Indonesian football goalkeeper

== Other uses ==
- Mount Guntur, a volcano in Indonesia
- Guntur, an administrative village, in Setiabudi, South Jakarta, Indonesia
- MV Guntur, a coastal tanker, formerly named Empire Barkis, in service with Shell Company of Singapore Ltd from 1947 to 1962
