= Emma (given name) =

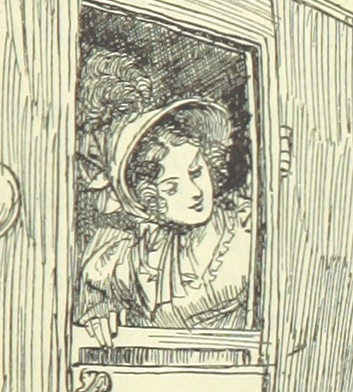
- An illustration of Emma Woodhouse from an edition of Emma by Jane Austen.
- Pronunciation: English: /ˈɛmə/ EM-ə; Dutch: [ˈɛmaː]; Finnish: [ˈemːɑ]; French: [ɛ(m)ma]; German: [ˈɛma]; Hungarian: [ˈɛmmɒ]; Spanish: [ˈemma]; Swedish: [ˈɛ̂mːa]; Tagalog: [ˈʔɛːmɐ]
- Gender: Female
- Name day: April 19

Origin
- Origin: Ancient Germanic, Ancient Scandinavian, Old Norse, Italian, and Modern Scandinavian
- Meaning: whole, universal

Other names
- Variant form: Ema
- Related names: Amalia, Amalie, Amelia, Amélie, Armgarð, Emilia, Émilie, Rémy, Emily, Emmeline, Emmett, Emmy, Remington, Ermengarde, Ermentrude, Erminie, Irma, Irmgard

Emma is a feminine given name. It is derived from the Germanic word ermen, meaning "whole" or "universal". It likely originated as a short form of names such as Ermengarde or Ermentrude. The first woman bearing the name to appear in written sources is Emma of Austrasia, the Frankish wife of Eadbald of Kent. Its popularity in the Middle Ages increased because it was the name of Emma of Normandy, mother of Edward the Confessor. Emmeline is a Norman variant of that was introduced to England by the Norman invaders in the 11th century. The name is etymologically unrelated to Amalia, Amelia, Emilia, and Emily, but all these names have been associated with each other due to their similarity in appearance and sound. Emma has been used as a short form of some of these names, and it shares diminutives such as Em or Emmy with them.

== Popularity ==
It became popular in the United States late in the 20th century, reaching the top 100 names for girls in the late 1990s. It has been among the top five names given to girls since 2002, and was the most popular name for girls in 2008 and from 2014 to 2018.

In England and Wales it was number 14 in 1996 but has dropped in popularity since (number 61 in 2021).

In Canada, it was the second most popular name given to girls in 2022.

== Notable people ==
- Emma, Lady Hamilton (1765–1815), English artist's model and performer
- Emma, Lady Radford (died 1937), English antiquarian and public servant
- Emma of Anjou (c. 1140 – c. 1214), Welsh royalty and half-sister of King Henry II of England
- Emma of Austrasia (fl. early seventh century), Frankish royalty
- Emma of Blois (c. 950–1003), Duchess consort of Aquitaine
- Emma of France (died 935), Queen of Western Francia and military leader
- Emma of Hawaii (1836–1885), queen to King Kamehameha IV from 1856 to his death in 1863
- Emma of Italy (fl. 948–987), Queen of Western Francia
- Emma of Lesum (c. 975–1038), saint and first female inhabitant of Bremen to be known by name
- Emma of Mělník (b. before 950, d. 1005/1006), wife of Boleslav II of Bohemia and Bohemian duchess
- Queen Emma of the Netherlands (1858–1934), Queen of the Netherlands and Grand Duchess of Luxembourg
- Emma of Normandy (c. 985–1052), twice Queen consort of the Kingdom of England
- Emma of Paris (943–968)
- Emma Adbåge (born 1982), Swedish illustrator and children's writer
- Emma Adler (1858–1935), Austrian journalist and writer
- Emma Ahuena Taylor (1867–1937), part-Native Hawaiian high chiefess
- Emma Albani (1847–1930), Canadian operatic soprano
- Emma Anderson (born 1967), English musician
- Emma Anderson (professor), Canadian professor
- Emma Andersson (born 1979), Swedish television personality and singer
- Emma Andijewska (born 1931), modern Ukrainian poet, writer and painter
- Emma Ania (born 1980), former track and field sprint athlete
- Emma Ankudey (born 1943), Ghanaian former amateur boxer
- Emma Anzai, bassist of Australian band Sick Puppies
- Emma B. Alrich (1845–1925), American journalist, author, educator
- Emma Appleton (born 1991), English actress and model
- Emma Asp (born 1987), Swedish football defender
- Emma Asson (1889–1965), Estonian politician
- Emma Atkins (born 1975), English actress
- Emma B (born 1970), English radio presenter
- Emma Whitcomb Babcock (1849–1926), American litterateur, author
- Emma Bache (born 1963), English graphologist
- Emma Baeri (born 1942), Sicilian feminist historian and essayist
- Emma Bailey (1910–1999), American auctioneer and author
- Emma Baker (journalist), television journalist and presenter employed by ITV Channel
- Emma Bale (born 1999), Belgian singer
- Emma Dunning Banks (1856–1931), American actress, dramatic reader, teacher, and writer
- Emma Bardac (1862–1934), French singer
- Emma Barnett (born 1985), British broadcaster and journalist
- Emma Baron (1904–1986), Italian stage and film actress
- Emma Barrandeguy (1914–2006), Argentine writer, journalist, poet, storyteller and playwright
- Emma Barrie (born 2002), Scottish netball player
- Emma Barton (born 1977), English actress
- Emma Bartoniek (1894–1957), Hungarian historian and bibliographer
- Emma Bates (born 1992), American runner
- Emma Pow Bauder (1848–1932), American evangelist and author
- Emma Beckett (footballer) (born 1987), Irish football midfielder
- Emma Bell (born 1986), American actress
- Emma Lee Benedict (1857–1937), American editor, educator, author
- Emma Bengtsson (born 1981), Swedish chef
- Emma Bergesen (born 1999), Norwegian ice hockey player
- Emma Berglund (born 1988), Swedish footballer
- Emma Bonino (1948–2026), Italian politician and human rights activist
- Emma Scarr Booth (1835–1927), British-born American novelist, poet
- Emma Bourne (1846–1924), American temperance activist and social reformer
- Emma Eliza Bower (1852–1937), American physician, club-woman, and newspaper owner, publisher, editor
- Emma Southwick Brinton (1834–1922), American Civil War nurse, traveller, correspondent
- Emma Elizabeth Brown (1847–?), American writer, artist
- Emma Alice Browne (1835–1890), American poet
- Emma Bull (born 1954), American science fiction and fantasy author
- Emma Bunton (born 1976), English singer, the Spice Girls
- Emma Mieko Candon, American novelist
- Emma Cannon (born 1989), American basketball player for the Israeli team Elitzur Ramla
- Emma Caulfield (born 1973), American actress
- Emma Čechová (born 2004), Czech basketball player
- Emma Chamberlain (born 2001), American internet personality
- Emma Chambers (1964–2018), British actress
- Emma C. Chappell (1941–2021), American banker
- Emma Checker (born 1996), Australian footballer
- Emma Churchill (1862–1957), founder of The Salvation Army in Newfoundland
- Emma Coates (born 1991), English football player and manager
- Emma Shaw Colcleugh (1846–1940), American journalist, lecturer, traveler, collector
- Emma Comer, Australian politician
- Emma Constable (born 1975), English badminton player
- Emma Cornelis (born 1999), French rower
- Emma Corrin (born 1995), English actress
- Emma Amelia Cranmer (1858–1937), American reformer, suffragist, writer
- Emma G. Cummings (1856–1940), American horticulturalist and ornithologist
- Emma D'Arcy (born 1992), English actor
- Emma Darwin (1808–1896), wife of Charles Darwin
- Emma de Cartosio (1928–2013), Argentine writer
- Emma de la Barra (1861–1947), Argentine writer
- Emma Beard Delaney (1871–1922), Baptist missionary and teacher
- Emma Lucy Dickson (1854–1926), Canadian writer who published one novel using the name Stanford Eleveth
- Emma Didlake (1905–2015), oldest U.S. veteran
- Emma Dolan (born 1998), English professional boxer
- Emma Doran (fl. 2010's), Irish comedian and podcaster
- Emma Dumont (born 1994), American actress and model
- Emma Bedelia Dunham (1826–1910), American poet, teacher
- Emma Ellingsen (born 2001), Norwegian model
- Emma Catherine Embury (1806–1863), American author, poet
- Emma Engdahl-Jägerskiöld (1852–1930), Finnish opera singer
- Emma Pike Ewing (1838–1917), American educator, author
- Emma Ferguson (born 1975), English actress, Mile High (TV series)
- Emma Forsayth (born 1850), Samoan businesswoman and plantation owner
- Emma B. Freeman (1880–1928), American photographer
- Emma Freud (born 1962), English broadcaster
- Emma Sheridan Fry (1864–1936), American actress, playwright, teacher
- Emma Fürstenhoff (1802–1871), Swedish florist
- Emma Sophia Galton (1811–1904), British finance guide author
- Emma Gatewood (1887–1973), American hiker
- Emma Gentry (born 2002), American ice hockey player
- Emma George (born 1974), Australian pole vaulter
- Emma Gilchrist, Canadian journalist
- Emma Goldman (1869–1940), Lithuania-born anarchist, writer and orator
- X González (born 1999), born Emma, American activist and advocate for gun control
- Emma Graf (1865–1926), Swiss historian, teacher, suffragist
- Emma Grant (footballer) (born 1989), Australian footballer
- Emma Grede (born 1982), British businesswoman
- Emma Green (athlete) (born 1984), Swedish athlete
- Emma Green (nurse) (1843–1929), 19th century southern belle
- Emma Jane Greenland (1760–1843), English painter, writer, singer
- Emma Blood French (1853–1932), American philanthropist
- Emma Azalia Hackley (1867–1922), African-American singer and political activist
- Emma Harman (1912–2020), American politician
- Emma Stark Hampton (1843–1925), American organizational leader
- Emma Heming (born 1978), English actress
- Emma Churchman Hewitt (1850–1921), American writer, journalist
- Emma Hippolyte, Saint Lucian politician
- Emma Holmgren (born 1997), Swedish footballer
- Emma Hope (born 1962), British shoe designer
- Emma Hult (born 1988), Swedish politician
- Emma Hwang (born 1971), Taiwanese-American scientist and aquanaut
- Emma Isaacs, Australian entrepreneur
- Emma Haruka Iwao (born 1984), Japanese computer scientist
- Emma Jansson (born 1996), Swedish footballer
- Emma Jung (1882–1955), Swiss psychologist and writer
- Emma Keenan (born 1997), Canadian ice hockey player
- Emma V. Kelley (1867–1932), African-American educator and community organizer.
- Emma Kennedy (born 1967), English actress
- Emma Smith Kennedy (1869–1960), American writer and granddaughter of Joseph Smith, Jr
- Emma Kickapoo (1880–1942), artists' model
- Emma Kirchner (1830–1909) German photographer who lived and worked in the Netherlands.
- Emma Kok (born 2008), Dutch singer
- Emma Lahana (born 1984), New Zealand actress and singer
- Emma Lai (born 1988), Hong Kong cricketer
- Emma Laine (born 1986), Finnish tennis player
- Emma Laird, British actress
- Emma Lamb (born 1997), English cricketeer
- Emma Lazarus (1849–1887), American poet
- Emma Augusta Lehman (1841–1922), American teacher, poet, naturalist and botanical collector
- Emma Lewell (born 1978), British politician
- Emma Ljungberg (born 1994), Swedish discus thrower
- Emma Logan, known as October (born 1997), New Zealand singer and model
- Emma Mackey (born 1996), French-British actress
- Emma Mäkelin (1874–1962), Finnish midwife and politician
- Emma Malabuyo (born 2002), American gymnast
- Emma Malewski (born 2004), German gymnast
- Emma B. Mandl (1842–1928), Bohemian-born American social reformer, clubwoman, and community leader
- Emma Marrone (born 1984), Italian pop singer
- Emma Martín (born 2002), Spanish footballer
- Emma Mason (born 1986), Scottish badminton player
- Emma Masterson (born 1977), Thai actress, model, and television presenter
- Emma Camp Mead (1866–1934), hotelkeeper and herbalist
- Emma Meesseman (born 1993), Belgian basketball player
- Emma Messing (1872–1950), American secretary and vaudeville performer
- Emma Meyer (1859–1921), Danish painter
- Emma Miyazawa (born 1988), Japanese actress
- Emma Barrett Molloy (1839–1907), American journalist, lecturer, and activist
- Emma Morano, (1899–2017) Italian supercentenarian
- Emma Myers (born 2002), American actress
- Emma Huntington Nason (1845–1921), American poet, author, and musical composer
- Emma Navarro (born 2001), American tennis player
- Emma Neale (born 1969), New Zealand novelist and poet
- Emma Norton, a British lawyer specialising in soldier's rights
- Emma Aline Osgood (1849–1911), American soprano
- Emma Pérez Ferreira (1925–2005), Argentine physicist
- Emma Plewa (born 1990), Welsh footballer
- Emma Preuschl (born 1984), American rower
- Emma Raducanu (born 2002), British tennis player
- Emma Amy Rea (1865–1927), British mycologist
- Emma May Alexander Reinertsen (1853–1920), American writer, social reformer
- Emma Reyes (1919–2003), Colombian painter and writer
- Emma Ann Reynolds (1862–1917), African-American teacher
- Emma Richter (1888–1956), German palaeontologist
- Emma Rigby (born 1989), English actress
- Emma Roberts, British aristocrat
- Emma Roberts (born 1991), American actress and singer
- Emma Rochlin (born 1978), Scottish field hockey player
- Emma Winner Rogers (1855–1922), American writer, speaker, suffragist
- Emma Rolfe (1860–1876), English murder victim
- Emma Ronsiek, American basketball player
- Emma Ruth Rundle (born 1983), American musician
- Emma Sachse (1887–1965), German activist for feminist and other political causes
- Emma Salokoski (born 1976), Finnish singer-songwriter
- Emma Samms (born 1960), English actress
- Emma Sandys (1842–1877), English painter
- Emma Clara Schweer (1896–2001), American politician
- Emma Shapplin (born 1974), French soprano
- Emma Augusta Sharkey (1858–1902), American writer, journalist, dime novelist, story-teller
- Emma L. Shaw (1840–1924), American magazine editor
- Emma Sidi (born 1991), English actress, comedian and writer
- Emma Sinclair, British businesswoman
- Emma H. Slade, American clubwoman
- Emma Slater (born 1988), British ballroom dancer
- Emma Smith (1804–1879), American religious leader and wife of Joseph Smith Jr.
- Emma Smith (artist) (1783–1853), English artist
- Emma Smith (author) (1923–2018), English novelist
- Emma Smith (gymnast) (born 1991), British trampoline gymnast
- Emma Elizabeth Smith (c. 1843–1888), prostitute and murder victim in London
- Emma Smith (scholar) (born 1970), lecturer in English at the University of Oxford
- Emma Waldo Smith Marshall (1879–1943), American Baptist missionary
- Emma Snowsill (born 1981), Australian triathlete
- Emma Solá de Solá (1894–1984), Argentine writer and poet
- Emma Stone (born Emily Jean Stone in 1988), American actress
- Emma Sulkowicz (born 1992), American performance artist and activist
- Emma Swift (born 1981), Australian singer-songwriter
- Emma Paddock Telford (1851–1920), American writer, war correspondent, editor, traveler
- Emma Taylor-Isherwood (born 1987), Canadian actress, Angel in Kuu Kuu Harajuku
- Emma Tenayuca (1916–1999), American labor leader and civil rights activist
- Emma Tennant (1937–2017), British novelist
- Emma Thomas (born 1971), British film producer
- Emma Thomas (Quaker) (1872–1960), English schoolteacher
- Emma Thomas (rugby union) (born 1958), New Zealand rugby union player
- Emma Thompson (born 1959), British actress and screenwriter
- Emma Tiglao (born 1994), Filipino actress, news anchor, model and beauty pageant titleholder
- Emma Thynn, Viscountess Weymouth (born 1986), English socialite
- Emma Rood Tuttle (1839–1916), American writer, poet
- Emma Vuitton (born 2003), French canoeist
- Emma Walker (2000–2016), American murder victim
- Emma Wallrup (born 1971), Swedish politician
- Emma Watkins (born 1989), Australian children's entertainer, The Wiggles
- Emma Watson (born 1990), British actress
- Emma Willard (1787–1870), women's education rights activist
- Emma Willis (born 1976), British TV presenter and former model, presenter of Big Brother
- Emma Heming Willis (born 1978), British-American model
- Emma Willis (gymnast) (born 1992), Canadian artistic gymnast
- Emma Woikin (1920–1974), Canadian spy for the Soviet Union
- Emma Wolf (1865–1932), American litterateur and novelist
- Emma Yong (1975–2012), Singaporean actress and singer
- Emma Zimmer (1888–1948), overseer at the Ravensbrück concentration camp executed for war crimes

== Characters ==
- Emma, the main character in Emma: A Victorian Romance
- Emma (The Promised Neverland), a main character in The Promised Neverland
- Emma Bovary, the main character in Madame Bovary, the début novel of French writer Gustave Flaubert
- Emma Brooker, a character from the British soap opera Coronation Street
- Emma Carstairs, a character and protagonist in Cassandra Clare's The Shadowhunter Chronicles and heroine in The Dark Artifices
- Emma Chase, Magnus Chase's cousin in Magnus Chase and the Gods of Asgard
- Emma Drake, a character in the American daytime drama General Hospital
- Emma Frost in Marvel Comics
- Aunt Emma "Em" Gale, Dorothy's aunt in The Wizard of Oz
- Emma Geller-Green, daughter of Rachel Green and Ross Geller on Friends
- Emma Goodall, the Megaforce Pink Ranger in Power Rangers Megaforce
- Emma Kazama a character from Ultraman Teo
- Emma Keane (Ackley Bridge), a teacher on Ackley Bridge
- Emma Meyer, character in The Boys (franchise)
- Emma Nelson (Degrassi: The Next Generation), the staple character in Degrassi: The Next Generation
- Emma Paley, a character in the comic series Peter Parker
- Emma Peel, television spy played by Diana Rigg in the British 1960s adventure series The Avengers
- Emma Pillsbury in Glee
- Emma Reid in Doctors
- Emma Sheen, Gundam pilot from the AEUG group in the anime series Mobile Suit Zeta Gundam
- Emma Swan, protagonist of the television series Once Upon a Time
- Emma Verde, a character in the media project Nijigasaki High School Idol Club
- Emma Woodhouse, the title character of Jane Austen's Emma
- "Emma Zunz" in the eponymous short story by Jorge Luis Borges
- Emma Ross, one of the main characters from the Disney Channel series, Jessie and Bunk'd.
