= Ermesinda (given name) =

Ermesinda is feminine given names of Germanic origin, being derived from Irmin- (cf. Irminsul and Irminones) and either -swint (strong) or -sind (way or journey, e.g., military expedition). A possible original meaning is "warpath of the Irminones".

Ermesinda is the Castilian and Galician form, while Ermessinda and Ermessenda are Catalan forms. The French forms are Ermesinde and Ermessende. Eremsindis is Latin. All forms, including Ermesind, appear in English. The hypocoristic form is Imma.

Persons with this given name include:

- Ermesinda (fl. c. 740), queen consort of Asturias
- Ermesinda (fl. 840), wife of Sunifred, Count of Barcelona
- Ermesinda (d. c. 925), daughter of Wifred the Hairy
- Ermesinda of Bigorre (d. 1049), queen consort of Aragon
- Ermesinde of Carcassonne (d. 1058), countess consort of Barcelona
- Ermesinde of Luxembourg, Countess of Namur (d. 1143)
- Ermessende of Pelet (d. 1176), heiress of the County of Melgueil
- Ermessenda de Rubió (d. 1221), abbess of the Monastery of Santa Maria de Vallbona
- Ermesinde, Countess of Luxembourg (d. 1247)

== Related names ==
- Ermelinda
- Ermenberga
- Ermengarde
- Ermenilda
- Ermentrude
