= Ermentrude (given name) =

- Gender: Female
- Language: German

Origin
- Meaning: Entirely beloved or Entirely strong

Other names
- Related names: Emma, Ermengarde, Ermentraut, Ermentrud, Ermentrudis, Erminie, Ermyntrude, Irmentrud, Irmtraud, Irmtrud

Ermentrude or Ermintrude is a feminine given name of German origin derived from the elements ermen or irmen, meaning "wholeness", and traut or trût, meaning "beloved", or þryþ, meaning "strength". The name Emma evolved as a short form of names such as Ermentrude.

Notable people with the name include:

- Erminethrudis (died c. 600), a Merovingian-era nun
- Ermentrude of Orléans (823–869), queen of the Franks by her marriage to Charles the Bald
- Ermentrude, daughter of Louis the Stammerer (born c. 875/78), wife of Count Eberard of Sulichgau
- Ermentrude de Roucy (958–1005), countess consort of Burgundy
- Ermentrude of Maine (d. 1126), Countess of Maine and the Lady of Château-du-Loir
- Ermyntrude Harvey (1895–1973), British tennis player

== Fictional characters ==
- Ermintrude, in the television series The Magic Roundabout
- Ermintrude, in Terry Pratchett's Nation (novel)
