= Erminie (given name) =

- Gender: Female
- Language: Old German

Origin
- Meaning: wholeness

Other names
- Related names: Armand, Armina, Emma, Erma, Ermengarde, Ermentrude, Ermina, Ermine, Herman, Hermina, Hermine, Irma, Irmgard, Irmina

Erminie is a feminine given name related to the Old German word element ermen, meaning wholeness. A variant, Ermine, is considered a feminine version of Herman that was influenced by associations with the fur of the ermine, which was traditionally worn by members of the peerage. Notable people with the name include:

- Erminie Cohen (1926–2019), Canadian politician
- Erminie Wheeler-Voegelin (1903–1988), American anthropologist, folklorist, and ethnohistorian

== See also ==
- Ermine Cowles Case (1871–1953), American paleontologist
- Hermine Küchenmeister-Rudersdorf (1822–1882), Ukrainian composer, teacher and writer
- Hallie Erminie Rives (1874–1956), American author
- Erminnie A. Smith (1836–1886), American linguist, ethnologist, anthropologist, and geologist
