= Ermentrude =

Ermentrude or Ermintrude is a feminine Germanic name from the Middle Ages. It may refer to:

- Erminethrudis (d. c. 600), a Merovingian-era nun
- Ermentrude of Orléans (823–869), queen of the Franks by her marriage to Charles the Bald
- Ermentrude, daughter of Louis the Stammerer (b. c. 875/78), wife of Count Eberard of Sulichgau
- Ermentrude de Roucy (958–1005), countess consort of Burgundy
- Ermentrude of Maine (d. 1126), Countess of Maine and the Lady of Château-du-Loir
- Ermyntrude, a principal character in George Bernard Shaw's one-act play The Inca of Perusalem
- Ermintrude, a character in the television series The Magic Roundabout
- Ermintrude, a character in Terry Pratchett's Nation (novel)

== See also ==
- Ermentrude (given name)
- Ermyntrude, similarly spelled name
- Hermuthruda, legendary queen of Scotland
- Michael Ehrmantraut, a fictional character in the shows Breaking Bad and Better Call Saul
- "The Defenestration of Ermintrude Inch", a science-fiction short story by Arthur C. Clarke
- Rae Armantrout, an American poet often associated with the Language poets
