= Levente =

Member of the House of Árpád, son of Vazul (died 1047)

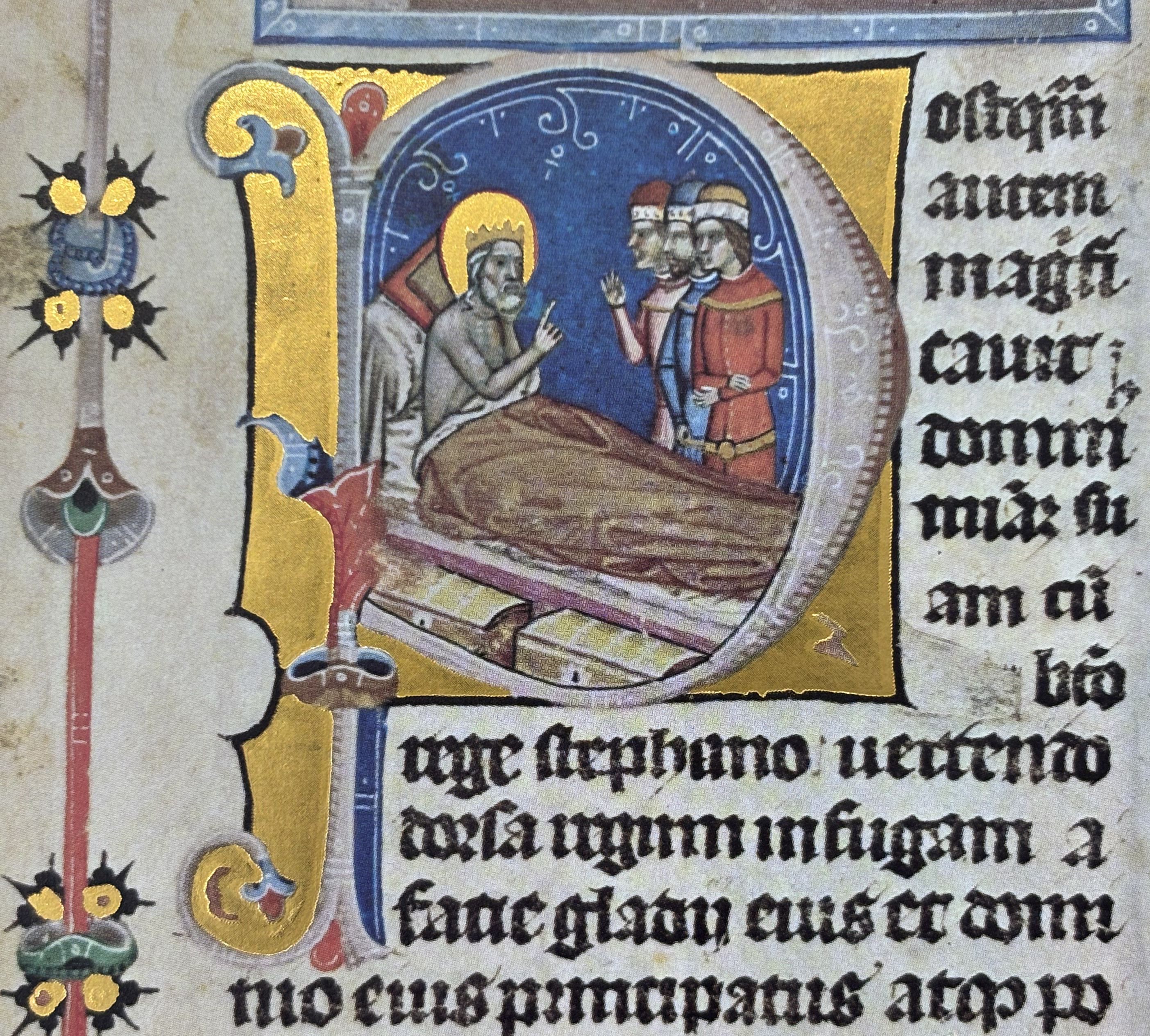
- King Stephen encourages princes Andrew, Béla and Levente to flee, as depicted by the 14th-century Illuminated Chronicle
- Born: between 1010 and 1015
- Died: 1047
- Dynasty: Árpád dynasty
- Father: Vazul
- Religion: Hungarian paganism

Levente (between 1010 and 1015 – 1047) was a member of the House of Árpád, a great-grandson of Taksony, Grand Prince of the Hungarians. He was expelled from Hungary in 1031 or 1032, and spent many years in Bohemia, Poland and the Kievan Rus'. He returned to Hungary, where a pagan uprising was developing around that time, in 1046. Levente remained a devout pagan, but did not hinder the election of his Christian brother, Andrew I as king.

== Childhood ==
Hungarian chronicles have preserved contradictory information of his parentage. According to one variant, Levente and his two brothers – Andrew and Béla – were "the sons of Ladislas the Bald" and his "wife from Ruthania", that is from the Kievan Rus'. On the other hand, a concurring tradition has preserved that the three brothers were sons of Ladislas the Bald's brother, "Vazul by some girl from the clan" of Tátony.

Modern historians – since the research of Péter Váczy – agree that the latter report is more reliable and unanimously write that Levente was born to Vazul and his concubine from the Tátony clan. However, historians still debate whether Levente was the eldest or a younger son of his father. Late 19th-century historians – Gyula Pauler, Henrik Marczali and János Karácsonyi – considered Levente as the youngest since the contemporary chronicles unanimously name Andrew, Béla, and Levente in that order. Later historians, e.g. Bálint Hóman, Emma Bartoniek, György Györffy, Gyula Kristó and Márta Font, refer to an entry in the Illuminated Chronicle regarding the renunciation his claim to the throne and in accordance with the traditional principle of seniority, while arguing in favor of Levente as the oldest of the three. Gyula Kristó, who says that Levente was Vazul's eldest son, writes that he was born between 1010 and 1015. Péter Báling argues the authentic Chronicle of Zagreb explicitly says that Béla was the second son of Vazul, which rules out the possibility that Levente would have been the oldest. Báling considers Levente was born around 1020.

== In exile and return ==
Levente, Andrew and Béla left Hungary after their father was blinded in 1031 or 1032. They first settled in Bohemia. They left Bohemia, where "their condition of life was poor and mean", according to the Illuminated Chronicle, and moved to the court of King Mieszko II of Poland in 1034 at the latest. The youngest among them, Béla settled here, but Levente and Andrew moved to Kiev. Andrew was baptized in Kiev, but Levente remained a devout pagan.

Dissatisfied with King Peter Orseolo, who succeeded Stephen I of Hungary, Hungarian lords persuaded Levente and Andrew to return to Hungary in 1046. Meanwhile, a great pagan uprising had broken out in Hungary. The rebels captured King Peter. The Hungarian lords and prelates preferred a Christian monarch and offered the crown to Andrew, while, as historian Sándor Tóth argues, leaders of the pagan revolt supported the claim of Levente, for he was not baptized, unlike his brothers. The Illuminated Chronicle states that Levente "would beyond doubt have corrupted all Hungary with paganism and idolatry". However, the same chronicle also writes that Levente gave the crown, in the "simplicity of spirit", to Andrew, suggesting that Levente voluntarily renounced the crown in favor of his brother. Levente died in 1047 and was buried in a village on the Danube which was named after his great-grandfather, Taksony, who was "said to lie in a pagan grave" there, according to the Illuminated Chronicle.

== Sources ==
=== Primary sources ===
- Simon of Kéza: The Deeds of the Hungarians (Edited and translated by László Veszprémy and Frank Schaer with a study by Jenő Szűcs) (1999). CEU Press. ISBN 963-9116-31-9.
- The Hungarian Illuminated Chronicle: Chronica de Gestis Hungarorum (Edited by Dezső Dercsényi) (1970). Corvina, Taplinger Publishing. ISBN 0-8008-4015-1.

=== Secondary sources ===
- Báling, Péter (2021). Az Árpád-ház hatalmi kapcsolatrendszerei. Rokonok, barátok és dinasztikus konfliktust Kelet-Közép-Európában a 11. században és a 12. század elején [The Power Relations of the Árpád Dynasty. Relatives, Friends and Dynastic Conflict in East-Central Europe in the 11th Century and Early 12th Century] (in Hungarian). Arpadiana VII., Research Centre for the Humanities. ISBN 978-963-416-246-9.
- Engel, Pál (2001). The Realm of St Stephen: A History of Medieval Hungary, 895–1526. I.B. Tauris Publishers. ISBN 1-86064-061-3.
- Kontler, László (1999). Millennium in Central Europe: A History of Hungary. Atlantisz Publishing House. ISBN 963-9165-37-9.
- Kristó, Gyula; Makk, Ferenc (1996). Az Árpád-ház uralkodói [Rulers of the House of Árpád] (in Hungarian). I.P.C. Könyvek. ISBN 963-7930-97-3.
- Steinhübel, Ján (2011). "The Duchy of Nitra". In Teich, Mikuláš; Kováč, Dušan; Brown, Martin D. (eds.). Slovakia in History. Cambridge University Press. pp. 15–29. ISBN 978-0-521-80253-6.
- Tóth, Sándor László (1994). "Levente". In Kristó, Gyula; Engel, Pál; Makk, Ferenc (eds.). Korai magyar történeti lexikon (9–14. század) [Encyclopedia of the Early Hungarian History (9th–14th centuries)] (in Hungarian). Akadémiai Kiadó. p. 408. ISBN 963-05-6722-9.
