= Emmeline (given name) =

Emmeline (also spelled Emeline, Emiline, Emilene, Emmilene, Emmaline, Emmalyn, Emalyn, or Ameline) is a feminine given name. The medieval name, a short form of Germanic names beginning with the element amal meaning "work", was introduced to England by the Normans.

== People ==
- Emmeline Hawthorne (born 1980), New Zealand actress
- Emmaline Henry (1928–1979), American actress
- Emmeline Hill (born 1974), Irish geneticist
- Emmeline Lott, British writer
- Emmeline Ndongue (born 1983), French basketball player
- Emmeline Pankhurst (1858–1928), British political activist
- Emmeline Pethick-Lawrence (1867–1954), British political activist
- Emmeline Ragot (born 1986), French downhill mountain biker
- Emmeline Stuart-Wortley (1806–1855), British writer
- Emmeline B. Wells (1828–1921), American writer

== Fictional characters ==
- Emmeline Lucas, character also known as "Lucia", in the Mapp and Lucia series
- Emmeline Finch, character in the film It's a Mad, Mad, Mad, Mad World
- Emmeline Vance, character and member of the Order of the Phoenix in the Harry Potter series
- Emmeline Frost-Summers from Marvel Comics
- Emmeline Lestrange, character in The Blue Lagoon
- Emmaline May, main character in "The Secret Horses of Briar Hill" by Megan Shepherd

== See also ==
- Emeline (disambiguation)
