= Emmeline (disambiguation) =

Emmeline is a novel by Charlotte Turner Smith.

Emmeline may also refer to:

- Emmeline (given name), a list of people named Emmeline
- Emmeline (Rossner novel), a novel by Judith Rossner
- Emmeline (opera), an opera by Tobias Picker

== See also ==
- Emeline (disambiguation)
- "Emelline", a 2008 song by Charli XCX
