= Emma Norton =

Emma Norton may refer to:

- Emma Norton (lawyer)
- Emma Norton (producer)
