= Irmtraut =

- Municipality
- Coat of arms

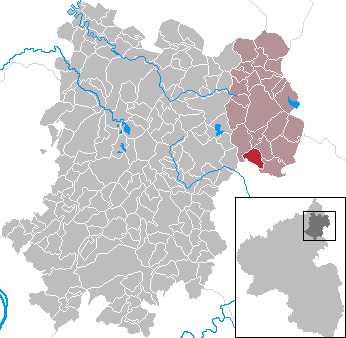
- Location of Irmtraut within Westerwaldkreis district
- Interactive map of Irmtraut
- Location within Germany Location within Rhineland-Palatinate
- Coordinates: 50°33′20″N 8°03′41″E
- Country: Germany
- State: Rhineland-Palatinate
- District: Westerwaldkreis
- Municipal assoc.: Rennerod

Government
  - Mayor (2019–24): Jens Peter Heun

Area
  - Total: 4.52 km^{2} (1.75 sq mi)
- Elevation: 360 m (1,180 ft)

Population (2025-12-31)
  - Total: 791
  - Density: 175/km^{2} (453/sq mi)
- Time zone: UTC+01:00 (CET)
  - Summer (DST): UTC+02:00 (CEST)
- Postal codes: 56479
- Dialling codes: 06436
- Vehicle registration: WW
- Website: www.irmtraut.de

Irmtraut is an Ortsgemeinde – a community belonging to a Verbandsgemeinde – in the Westerwaldkreis in Rhineland-Palatinate, Germany.

== Geography ==
The community lies in the Westerwald between Siegen and Limburg at the boundary with Hesse. Irmtraut belongs to the Verbandsgemeinde of Rennerod, a kind of collective municipality.

== History ==
In 879, Irmtraut had its first documentary mention when Gebhard, Count of the Lahngau donated holdings here to the St. Severus Monastery in Gemünden.

== Politics ==
The municipal council is made up of 14 council members, who all belong to the Wählergemeinschaft ("Voters' Community"), and who were elected in a majority vote in a municipal election on 13 June 2004.

== Economy and infrastructure ==
The local bus line 477 runs on the route Rehe - Rennerod - Irmtraut - Westerburg Montabaur. The village is located in the area of the transport association Verkehrsverbund Rhein-Mosel (VRM). Running right through the community is Bundesstraße 54, leading from Limburg an der Lahn to Siegen. The nearest Autobahn interchange is Limburg-Nord on the A 3 (Cologne–Frankfurt), some 20 km away. The nearest InterCityExpress stop is the railway station at Montabaur on the Cologne-Frankfurt high-speed rail line.

== See also ==
- Armentrout (surname)
