= Ermyntrude =

Ermyntrude is a feminine given name. Notable people with the surname include:

- Ermyntrude Harvey (1895–1973), British female tennis player
- Edna Ermyntrude Bourne, first woman elected to the Barbadian Parliament

== See also ==
- Ermentrude
