= Ermentraut =

Ermentraut (variants include Irmentraut, Ermantraut, Ehrmantraut and Ehrmanntraut) is a rare German surname. Further Americanized variant spellings include Ermentrout, Armentrout, Armintrout, Armantrout and Armontrout.

== History ==
The Dictionary of American Family Names derives it from a feminine German given name Irmtraut, Irmentrud (equivalent to Anglo-Saxon Ermendrud), originally from the Germanic name elements Irmin (a Germanic god, son of Mannus) plus thrud "strength". The variant Ehrmantraut suggests a folk etymological connection to ehr- "honour".

The derivation of German surnames from feminine given names is unusual, and at least the name Irmtraut, but possibly also the Ermentraut varieties, is instead derived from the von Irmtraut (von Ermetrode) family, members of the German lower nobility, first recorded in 1215. In this case, Irmtraut is a locational surname, derived from the name of the Irmtraut, a settlement first recorded in 879 as Ermetrode, as part of Lahngau (the modern spelling Irmtraut dates to 1578). The form Ermetrode suggests that the later spelling in -traut is a folk etymological connection to the feminine names in -trude "strength", while the original toponym was formed in -rode, a frequent suffix in Carolingian-era foundations meaning "clearing". The toponym Ermetrode (Irmtraut) is thus from ermet "poverty" (modern Armut) and rode "clearing", referring to a patch of poor farmland. Members of the von Irmtraut family served as reeves in Westerburg. The noble family was extinct in the male line in 1741, but Prince-elector Charles Theodore transferred the name to the von Werkamp family, because they were descended from the von Irmtraut in the female line. This family was extinct in 1913.

The presence of the surname in America is recorded for 1739, with the arrival in Philadelphia of one Anna Elizabeth Ermentraudt (née Hain). Anna Elizabeth Ermentraudt moved to Shenandoah Valley, Virginia with her second son, Johan Phillip Ermentraudt, in 1752. Under the spelling Armentrout, her descendants became land-owners in Harrisonburg, Virginia.

== Notable people ==
People with the surname include:

- Daniel Ermentrout (1837–1899), American politician
- Franz Anton Ermeltraut (de), also Ermentraut (1717–1767), Baroque painter in Würzburg
- George Bard Ermentrout (b. 1954), American mathematician
- Horst Ehrmantraut (b. 1955), German footballer
- Jennifer Armintrout (b. 1980), American writer
- Jennifer L. Armentrout (b. 1980), American writer
- Peter B. Armentrout (born 1953), American chemist

Fictional characters:

- Mike Ehrmantraut, character in Breaking Bad and Better Call Saul
- Stacey Ehrmantraut, character in Breaking Bad and Better Call Saul
- Kaylee Ehrmantraut, character in Breaking Bad and Better Call Saul

== See also ==
- Irmtraut
