= Ermelinda =

Ermelinda may refer to:

- Ermelinda, opera by Vincenzo Battista, performed in English in London in 1856 as Esmeralda.
- Ermelinda, opera by Domenico Freschi
- Ermelinda (queen), wife of the Lombard king Cunipert
- Ermelinda Meksi an Albanian politician
- Ermelinda Zamba (1981) a Mozambican former swimmer
- Ermelinda DeLaViña American mathematician
