= Emmeline Lott =

British travel writer (fl.1866)

Emmeline Lott was a British governess and travel writer. She is known for her travels to Egypt and the popular books she wrote afterwards.

In 1863, Lott went to Egypt, tasked with teaching a 5-year-old son of Egyptian Viceroy Isma'il Pasha. She kept the position for two years, before returning to England and writing several books about her experiences. One of these accounts was The English Governess in Egypt: Harem Life in Egypt and Constantinople (1867). Lott believed that her position as a "humble individual" and member of the household provided her with a more authentic perspective than that of aristocratic visitors such as Lady Mary Wortley Montagu, for whom the harem was tidied up for public viewing. Lott's tone towards Egyptian women is often contemptuous - she claims that far from being Oriental beauties of European fantasy, they are "hideous and hag-like". Lott believed herself to be superior to Egyptians by virtue of her race; it was a shock to find that as a governess, she was treated as a servant and a social inferior.
