= Emma Solá de Solá =

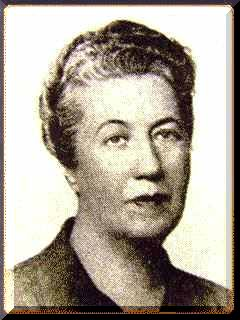

Emma Solá de Solá (1894–1984) was an Argentine writer and poet. She is closely identified with her hometown of Salta, where she lived until her death. Sola was a prolific author in the interwar years, and religion - specifically Catholicism - is one of the primary themes in her writing. Notably, she wrote the Hymn of the Lord of the Miracle, a poem dedicated to the Señor y Virgen del Milagro, a major Christian devotional figure in Salta. In her role as a Catholic writer, she also spoke out against communism.

In addition to her published books, she also wrote regularly in regional newspapers and journals. Her work has been preserved and digitized, thanks to the efforts of her great-niece Susana Castellanos. She was the sister of the writer Sara Solá and the historian Miguel Solá.

She died in July 1984.

== Selected works ==
- Himno al Señor del Milagro
- El agua que canta
- El sendero y la estrella
- Esta eterna inquietud (poems)
- La madre del viento
- Miel de la tierra
- Clamor
- El alma de la noche
- Antología del Milagro
- Hacia e Norte Argentino
- Chango y Mancha
