= Emeline =

Emeline may refer to:

== People ==
- Emeline Afeaki-Mafile'o, New Zealand activist
- Emeline S. Burlingame (1836–1923), American editor, evangelist and suffragist
- Laura Emeline Eames Chase (1856–1917), American dentist
- Emeline Horton Cleveland (1829–1878), American physician
- Emeline Harriet Howe (1844–1934), American poet
- Emeline Roberts Jones (1836–1916), first woman to practice dentistry in the U.S.
- Emeline King (born 1957), African American industrial designer
- Emeline Meaker (1838–1883), first woman who was legally executed by Vermont, U.S.
- Emeline Michel, Haitian singer
- Laura Emeline Newell (1854–1916), American songwriter
- Emeline Piggott (1836–1919), Confederate States of America spy from North Carolina, U.S.
- Emeline Hill Richardson (1910-1999), American archaeologist
- Emeline (singer), Los Angeles based pop singer songwriter originally from Rhode Island who is also known as Emeline Easton

== Places ==
- Emeline Island, rocky island on the west side of English Strait

== Other ==
- Emeline Fairbanks Memorial Library, in Terre Haute, Indiana, U.S.
- Emeline Patch House, historic house in Hamilton, Massachusetts, U.S.
- USS Emeline (SP-175), yacht acquired by the U.S. Navy during World War I

== See also ==
- "Emelline", a 2008 song by Charli XCX
- Emmeline (disambiguation)
