= Emma B. Mandl =

Emma B. Mandl (December 16, 1842 – July 31, 1928) was a Bohemian-born American social reformer, clubwoman, and community leader based in Chicago, Illinois.

== Early life and education ==
Emma Adler was born in Plzeň, Bohemia, the daughter of Jonas Adler and Charlotte Goldscheider Adler. The Adler family immigrated to the United States in 1858.

== Career ==
Emma B. Mandl organized many charities focused on Jewish women and children in Chicago. She was a founder and president of the Baron Hirsch Woman's Club (North Side Ladies' Aid Society) for fourteen years. From that position, she founded or helped to found the Home for Jewish Friendless and Working Girls, the Chicago-Winfield Tuberculosis Sanitarium, the Ruth Club for Working Girls, the Grandmothers Music and Reading Circle, the Home for Convalescent Men and Boys, and the Jewish Home Finding Society for Children, all in Chicago. She was an officer of the Home for Jewish Orphans and the Illinois First District Federation of Women's Clubs. She was a member of the Chicago Association of Jewish Women, and of the Sarah Greenbaum Lodge, Deborah Verein.

Beyond charitable activities, she was a probation officer for the Juvenile Court of Chicago, and a director of the Bureau of Personal Service.

== Personal life ==
Emma Adler married Bernhard Mandl in 1865 in Chicago. They had two children, Sydney and Etta. She died in 1928, aged 85. At her funeral, Jane Addams, Henry Horner, and Julius Rosenwald were named among her honorary pallbearers.

Many of the organizations begun with Mandl's efforts became part of United Hebrew Charities, and eventually came under the oversight of the Jewish Federation of Metropolitan Chicago.
