= Emma Sachse =

German political activist

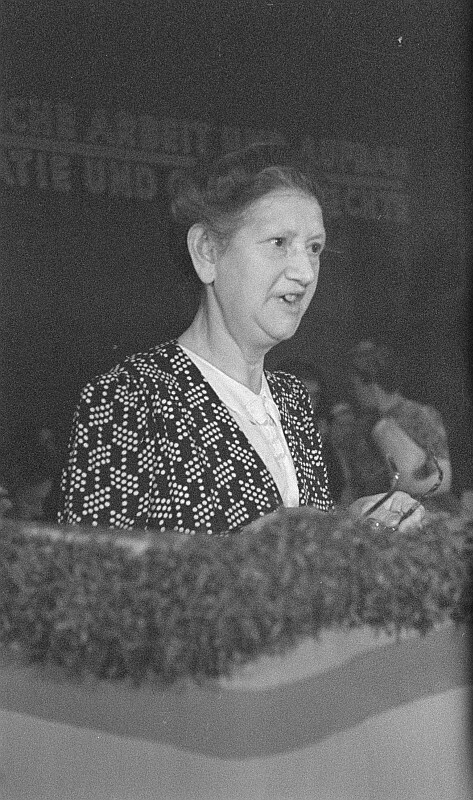
- Emma Sachse at the First Delegates Conference of the Women's Committees 1946 in Berlin.
- Born: Emma Claus; 8 May 1887; Göttingen, Germany
- Died: 24 January 1965 (aged 77); Altenburg or Leipzig
- Occupation: Political activist
- Known for: Thuringia parliament ("Landtag")

Emma Sachse (born Emma Claus, 8 May 1887 – 24 January 1965) was a German activist for feminist and other political causes. She was a member of the Thuringia parliament ("Landtag") and later became chair of the Workers' Welfare Organisation ("Arbeiterwohlfahrt" / AWO) in Thuringia.

== Life ==
Emma Claus was born in Göttingen, the sixth of her parents' nine recorded children. Her father was an unskilled rural labourer and the family was poor. The family atmosphere in which she grew up was strongly Christian, and she herself excelled during her six years at junior school, but it was not financially possible for her to progress to secondary school. On leaving school she worked for neighbouring families as a child care giver and helped with her own family's "home work" which involved boxing up and weighing packets of washing powder for the local soap factory. When she was 15 she moved to Leipzig and entered domestic service, developing an acute awareness of the great disparity between the life opportunities of the poor and those of the ruling classes.

In 1905 she met her future husband, a print worker from Altenburg. He introduced her to the burgeoning labour movement. Emma Claus married in 1909 and took the name Emma Sachse: in 1913 the Sachse family relocated to Altenburg as a result of her husband accepting a job with the Altenburger Volkszeitung newspaper. While living as a housewife and young mother she was able to progress her political education through careful reading of the Leipziger Volkszeitung, a socialist daily paper, and of the women's magazine Die Gleichheit ("Equality"), and became increasingly committed to socialist politics and the extension of women's rights, trusted by SPD party comrades in Saxe-Altenburg, at that stage still a relatively autonomous territory within Germany.

In 1914 she joined the Social Democratic Party. Her husband had already become a member two years earlier. By the time the war ended, in 1918, Emma Sachse had acquired Thuringian citizenship, and shortly afterwards she attended an SPD national women's conference in Kassel, as a delegate representing the socialist women of East Thuringia. This was the start of an involvement in the SPD at a national level which lasted till 1933. She sat on various party committees, participated in party conferences, and served between 1927 and 1933 on the party's national executive committee.

=== Political activities ===
Between 1920 and 1933, Emma Sachse sat as a member of the Thüringian regional parliament ("Landtag") without interruption. There were seven women in the assembly during this period, but only two of these - Emma Sachse and Marie Schulz, who was a member between 1920 and 1928 - had such lengthy periods of continuous service. After 1932 Emma Sachse was the only female member of the Landtag serving on the budget committee, the committee for legislation and administration, the committee for legislation and social policy, and as a deputy chair of the investigation committee. She also stood for election to the national parliament (Reichstag) in 1928 and 1932, but without success.

In her political work, Sachse concentrated on helping the poor. She involved herself in setting up women's groups in the SPD and on local committees for the Workers' Welfare ("Arbeiterwohlfahrt"/ AWO) movement. In 1929/30 she took on chairmanship if the Worker's Welfare group for Greater Thüringia and made it her objective to ease the financial burdens on working families. She was particularly concerned with creating life chances for young people and women, and emergency relief in the rural parts of Thüringia. She saw her role as building the AWO by building support for it inside the SPD, and using her elected official roles to promote it as a way for the state to fulfill its welfare responsibilities to make life less difficult for the disadvantaged.

Towards the end of the 1920s the clear drift towards right-wing race-based populism became hard to ignore. Emma Sachse reacted by firmly positioning herself in opposition to antisemitism. During the increasingly frenzied final years of the Weimar period she spoke out against national rearmament and the dismantling of social welfare structures. At the AWO regional conference of 1930 the movement adopted a resolution protesting in the sharpest terms against the threatened institutional destruction in the areas of social and welfare policy which the fascist structures proposed for Thüringia incorporated.

=== War years ===
The political backdrop changed completely in January 1933 with the Nazi take-over. The new government lost little time in transforming Germany into a one-party dictatorship, and after the Reichstag Fire of February 1933 had been, with striking immediacy, blamed on "communists", political activists with Communist and other left-wing backgrounds found themselves the targets of unwelcome government attention. Emma Sachse was taken into "protective custody" and placed in the local Altenburg jail. On her release she worked as a "travelling clothes and fabrics sales person" ("Reisende mit Textilwaren"), while her husband and son were unable to obtain work for the next six years. During this period she got to know a number of anti-fascists to whom she was able, quietly, to provide support, later becoming involved in resistance activity herself.

She was rearrested in August 1944, in the context of the mass round-up of those who had been politically involved before 1933 that the government implemented following the unsuccessful assassination attempt against the country's leader. She was taken to Ravensbrück concentration camp, where she survived her period of internment. In the concentration camp she met the communist former Reichstag deputy Johanna Himmler: the two formed what became a lifelong friendship.

=== Post World War II ===
The Second World War ended in May 1945, and there was a widespread belief that this should mean an end of one-party dictatorship in Germany. In Berlin, on 15 June 1945 Emma Sachse took part in the (re-)founding of the Social Democratic Party (SPD) and the establishment of the Free German Trade Union Federation ("Freier Deutsche Gewerkschaftsbund " / FDGB). She then returned to Altenburg on 29 June 1945 and resumed her political engagement. Altenburg had been freed from Nazi rule by American troops on 15 April 1945. However, by that time the US president and the Soviet leader had already agreed a post war division of Germany which left the central portion of the country defined as the Soviet occupation zone. On 1 July 1945 US troops withdrew and the Red army moved in: Altenburg, like the rest of Thuringia, was to be administered under the Soviet Union. She joined the board of Thuringia's social insurance organisation, the "Victims of Fascism" committee, the Refugee Committee and the Nutrition Council. Her personal experience of life in Nazi Germany made her a forceful advocate in favour of the contentious merger of the former Communist Party and the Social Democratic Party which took place (at least in respect of the Soviet occupation zone) in April 1946. (There was a widespread belief that political division on the left had opened the way for the Nazi take-over in 1933.) She became a leading official of the new Socialist Unity Party ("Sozialistische Einheitspartei Deutschlands" / SED) in Thuringia, and a member of the large party executive in Berlin. She led the Anti-fascist Women's Committee in Altenburg and in the surrounding district. Till September 1948 she also had a position as the regional women's advisor for the Democratic Women's League ("Demokratischer Frauenbund Deutschlands" / DFD). Until the 1952 abolition, in what be then had become the German Democratic Republic, of regional parliaments, Sachse also resumed and progressed the work she had undertaken in the Thüringia Parliament / Landtag, concentrating as before on social issues and women's work.

Sources are silent on her final decade. Emma Sachse died on 24 January 1965 in Altenburg or Leipzig.

== Legacy ==
The Emma Sachse Honor, AWO Thuringia's highest honor, has been awarded once a year since 1999 for special achievements as part of the annual AWO Ball. Award winners have included:

- 1999 - Erika Schneider - AWO district association Sömmerda-Apolda
- 2000 - Werner Voigt - AWO district association Erfurt
- 2001 - Hildegard Fischer - AWO district association Hildburghausen
- 2002 - Herta Rudloff - AWO district association Wartburgkreis
- 2003 - Johanna Tietsch - AWO district association Saale-Orla e. V.
- 2004 - Teresa Kettner - AWO district association Saalfeld-Rudolstadt e. V.
- 2005 - Ursula Gräbedünkel - AWO district association Saalfeld-Rudolstadt e. V.
- 2006 - Konrad Eberitzsch - AWO district association Rudolstadt e. V.
- 2007 - Ilse Börner - AWO district association Hildburghausen e. V.
- 2008 - Gudrun Dietrich - AWO district association Saalfeld-Rudolstadt e. V.
- 2009 - Ilona Holz - AWO Kreisverband Gotha e. V.
- 2010 - Rosemarie Selle - AWO district association Greiz e. V.
- 2011 - Walter Thomas - AWO Regional Association South-West Thuringia e. V.
- 2012 - Anni Ortloff - AWO Kreisverband Ilmkreis e. V.
- 2013 - Wolfgang Metz - AWO Kreisverband Erfurt e. V.
- 2014 - Gerhard Dittel - AWO District Association Altenburger Land e. V.
- 2015 - Gudrun Becker - AWO district association Ilm-Kreis e. V.
- 2016 - Roswitha Jendrzeyewski - AWO Regional Association South-West Thuringia e. V.
- 2017 - Prof. Dr. med. Bernhard Maak - AWO district association Saalfeld-Rudolstadt e. V.
- 2018 - Lore Mikolajczyk - AWO district association Sonneberg e. V.
- 2019 - Dr. Karl-Heinz Stengler - AWO Regional Association South-West Thuringia e. V.
- 2021 - Claudia Zanker - AWO Regional Association Central-West Thuringia e. V.
- 2022 - Winfried Matiss - AWO Rudolstadt e. v.
