= List of Ultraman Teo characters =

This is the character list of 2026 Ultra Series Ultraman Teo.

== Meishin University ==
Meishin University (明心大学, Meishin Daigaku) is the university that Ibuki attends.

=== Ibuki Mitsuishi ===
Ibuki Mitsuishi (光石 イブキ, Mitsuishi Ibuki) is the human identity of Ultraman Teo. After losing his home world Planet H12 to a space monster attack, he lives on Earth as a third-year veterinary student at the university. Ibuki often has difficulty fitting in among humans and keeps a large number of notes on his person to learn normal human behavior. Ibuki has a cheerful personality and detests conflict.

Ibuki transforms into the blue-colored Ultraman Teo by using the Teo Crystar (テオクリスター, Teo Kurisutā), which becomes his Color Timer in Ultra form. Unsuited to combat, Ultraman Teo relies on the Teo Crystar to fight. When grasped, it temporarily charges his body with different colored Hidden Energy (秘められたエネルギー, Himerareta Enerugī) in order to perform various special abilities, including his finishing move Teocium Beam (テオシウム光線, Teoshiumu Kōsen). By imitating Ultraman Zero's technique, Ultraman Teo can perform the L-style Wide Teo Shot (ワイドテオショット, Waido Teo Shotto).

Ibuki Mitsuishi is portrayed by Aoi Iwasaki (岩崎 碧, Iwasaki Aoi).

=== Emma Kazama ===
Emma Kazama (風間 エマ, Kazama Ema) is a 21-year-old third-year veterinary student who majors in veterinary medicine and is the president of the university's astronomy club. She gives nicknames to the monsters and gave Pucchi its name.

Emma Kazama is portrayed by Amane Kamiya (神谷 天音, Kamiya Amane).

=== Kanna Izumi ===
Kanna Izumi (和泉 カンナ, Izumi Kan'na) is a 21-year-old third-year veterinary student who majors in animal science and biotechnology and is a member of the university's astronomy club. She prefers working on projects alone rather than interacting with others.

Kanna Izumi is portrayed by Noa Nakada (中田 乃愛, Nakada Noa) (Note: Noa Nakada was later credited posthumously starting from episode 19 after her passing on November 16, 2026).

=== Rintaro Hiura ===
Rintaro Hiura (火浦 リンタロウ, Hiura Rintarō) is a 20-year-old third-year veterinary student who majors in veterinary medicine and is a member of the university's astronomy club. His blunt personality hides a kind heart. He entered veterinary medicine because it was the only entrance exam in a medical field he was able to pass and soon realized that he is afraid of touching animals. He later switches his major to veterinary research, allowing him to continue helping animals without needing to come in direct contact with them.

Rintaro Hiura is portrayed by Yu Uemura (上村 侑, Uemura Yū).

=== Wataru Tomabechi ===
Wataru Tomabechi (苫米地 ワタル, Tomabechi Wataru) is a 33-year-old third-year veterinary student who majors in veterinary medicine and is a member of the university's astronomy club. He is also a former rescue worker. He tries to get everyone to call him "Bechi," but so far only Ibuki uses the nickname.

Wataru Tomabechi is portrayed by Ryoma Morimoto (森本 竜馬, Morimoto Ryōma).

=== Junpei Minobe ===
Junpei Minobe (美濃部 順平, Minobe Junpei) is a professor in the Department of Animal Science and Biotechnology, Faculty of Veterinary Medicine.

Junpei Minobe is portrayed by Makita Sports (マキタスポーツ, Makita Supōtsu).

== Kyoko Shiga ==
Kyoko Shiga (志賀 今日子, Shiga Kyōko) is an investigator for the Unidentified Threat Task Force (UTTF), an international organization established by the United Nations and NASA, who is dispatched to Japan to investigate the giant monsters that have appeared there.

Kyoko Shiga is portrayed by Rila Fukushima (福島 リラ, Fukushima Rira).

== Alien Zeinos ==
Intelligent Alien Alien Zeinos (知的異星体 ゼイノス星人, Chiteki Iseitai Zeinosu Seijin) is an alien who has possessed Kyoko.

== Monsters and aliens ==
- H12 People (H12の人々, Eichi Wan Tsū no Hitobito; 1, 10): Ultraman Teo's people, a race of primarily blue-colored Ultras. Their planet was destroyed in a space monster invasion, forcing many of them to flee into space. They receive a special mineral at birth, which is contained in objects like Ultraman Teo's Teo Crystar. They are voiced by Taisuke Nakano (中野 泰佑, Nakano Taisuke), Shintarō Tanaka (田中 進太郎, Tanaka Shintarō), and Jin Morishita (森下 人, Morishita Jin).
- Mini Monster Pucchi (プチ怪獣 プッチー, Puchi Kaijū Putchī): A space monster known as Sympathetic Star Bem Pigterus (共鳴星獣 ピグテラス, Kyōmei Seijū Piguterasu) that is found near a hidden space pod in the mountains and is taken in by Ibuki and the astronomy club members. Pucchi is an empath, able to sync with and mirror strong emotions. Though it is normally docile and human-sized, it can transform into the more aggressive and combat-oriented Giant Pucchi (巨大化プッチー, Kyodaika Putchī) when it syncs with a strong desire to protect or fight. It is for this reason that Pigterus are considered dangerous and highly sought-after living weapons in intergalactic society. It can also enlarge itself in its docile form and fly by flapping its ear-like appendages. It is voiced by Yū Kobayashi (小林 ゆう, Kobayashi Yū).
- Brutal Star Bem Vialoga (暴悪星獣 ヴィアロガ, Bōaku Seijū Viaroga; 1): A space monster of the same species as the monsters that destroyed Ibuki's home world. This particular Vialoga is killed by Teo's Teocium Beam, but its corpse is consumed by Sodera.
  - Brutal Star Bem Vialoga II (暴悪星獣 ヴィアロガⅡ, Bōaku Seijū Viaroga Tsū; 2, 3): The second Vialoga to appear on Earth. It is defeated and consumed by Sodera.
- Subterranean Winged Beast Sodera (地底有翼獣 ソデラ, Chitei Yūyokujū Sodera; 2, 3): A monster that preys on other monsters. It is killed by Teo's Teocium Beam.
- Tentacle Monster Doshihagachi (触手怪獣 ドシハガチ, Shokushu Kaijū Doshihagachi; 4, 5):
- Lone Monstrous Bird Vermilios (孤独怪鳥 バルミリオス, Kodoku Kaichō Barumiriosu; 6, 7):
- Electric Beast Volthog (電獣 ヴォルトグ, Denjū Vorutogu; 7-9):
- Red Sphere (赤い球, Akai Tama; SP2): A pinnacle of material civilization able to grant any wish. It is voiced by Gara Shirtman (柄シャツ男, Gara Shatsuo) and first appeared in Ultraman Gaia: The Battle in Hyperspace.
  - Sea Monster King Guesra (Infant) (海獣 キングゲスラ (幼体), Kaijū Kingu Gesura (Yōtai); SP2): A form the Red Sphere temporarily assumed. First appeared in episode 2 of Ultraman Taiga.
  - Lim Eleking (リムエレキング, Rimu Erekingu; SP3): A form the Red Sphere temporarily assumed. First appeared in episode 8 of Ultraman Mebius as a Maquette Monster copy of the original monster.
- Colossal Mountain Beast Ozuyanushi (大山獣 オズヤヌシ, Daisanjū Ozuyanushi; 10): A colossal, immobile monster that looks like a mountain. Ultraman Teo helps it by making it sneeze, unclogging the garbage blocking its nostrils. It is voiced by Naoyuki Uchida (内田 直之, Uchida Naoyuki).
- Possessing Star Bem Bodyroba (憑依星獣 バデロバ, Hyōi Seijū Baderoba; 11, 12): A space monster that can possess other monsters. It is killed by Teo's Wide Teo Shot, Giant Pucchi's Terrus Shoot, and Ultraman Zero's Wide Zero Shot.
- Dog-Wolf Monster Black Doglf (犬狼怪獣 ブラックドグルフ, Kenrō Kaijū Burakku Dogurufu; 11): A monster possessed by Bodyroba. It is killed by Zero's Wide Zero Shot.
- Subterranean Monster Nebora (地底怪獣 ネボラ, Chitei Kaijū Nebora; 12): A monster possessed by Bodyroba.
- Vampire Star Bem Gymaira (吸血星獣 ギマイラ, Kyūketsu Seijū Gimaira; 14): A space monster. It is killed by Teo's Wide Teo Shot. First appeared in episode 17 of Ultraman 80 under the subtitle Vampire Monster.
- Ancient Dragonic Beast Jyagara (古代龍獣 ジャガラ, Kodai Ryūjū Jagara; 15):
- Destructive Rampage Dragon Deathdrago (破壊暴竜 デスドラゴ, Hakai Bōryū Desudorago; 16): First appeared in episode 5 of Ultraman Trigger: New Generation Tiga.
- Laser Claw Monster Therizirus (刃爪怪獣 テリジラス, Jinsō Kaijū Terijirasu; 17): It is killed by Teo's Teocium Beam. First appeared in episode 4 of Ultraman Omega.
- Proliferation Alien Alien Lookizom (増殖宇宙人 ルキゾム星人, Zōshoku Uchūjin Rukizomu Seijin; 18, 19): He is voiced by Wataru Hatano (羽多野 渉, Hatano Wataru).
