= Emma Isaacs =

Australian entrepreneur

- Occupation: Entrepreneur
- Known for: Global CEO of Business Chicks
- Website: emmaisaacs.com

Emma Isaacs is an Australian entrepreneur. She is the owner and Global CEO of Business Chicks, an Australian businesswomen's community.

== Career ==
Isaacs bought her first business ay 18, a recruitment company called Staff It. When she was 25, she went to her first Business Chicks event and later bought the business. Under Isaacs' direction, Business Chicks has hosted speakers including Sir Richard Branson, Nicole Kidman, Jamie Oliver, Bob Geldof and Arianna Huffington.

Isaacs first bought Business Chicks, intending it to be a side business for her recruitment agency; however, it grew into a large business community for women in Australia. With over 44000 members, Business Chicks is one of the few networks of its kind in Australia, hosting regular events that strive to empower businesswomen.

Isaacs was previously the president of the Sydney chapter of Entrepreneurs' Organisation. She also sat on the board for The Hunger Project. Isaacs writes a column for the Business Chicks magazine. In August 2018, she was interviewed by Radio National's Life Matters program about risk-taking.

=== Books ===
- Winging it, Macmillan by Pan Macmillan Australia, 2018 ISBN 9781760556488
- The New Hustle, Macmillan by Pan Macmillan Australia, 2021 ISBN 9781760787660

=== Honours ===
- Telstra Business Women's Awards in 2015.
- Isaacs named one of Australia's nine most influential female entrepreneurs by Sydney Morning Herald in 2016.

== Personal life ==
Isaacs is married and has six children. She currently resides in Los Angeles.

On 14 February 2023, Isaacs publicly revealed her relationship with speaker and poet Azure Antoinette.
