= Emma Amy Rea =

British mycologist (1865–1927)

Emma Amy Rea FLS
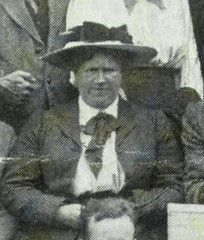
- Rea in 1913
- Born: 1865; Lincoln, Lincolnshire, England
- Died: 1927 (aged 61–62)
- Organization(s): British Mycological Society; Linnean Society of London
- Spouse: Carleton Rea (m. 1898)
- Children: Violet Ashley-Cooper

Emma Amy Rea FLS (née Rose, 1865–1927) was a British mycologist and scientific illustrator. She was president of the British Mycological Society (1915–1916) and a fellow of the Linnean Society of London.

== Family ==
Emma Amy Rose was born in 1865 in Lincoln, Lincolnshire. She was married to naturalist Carleton Rea (1861–1946) in 1898. They had a daughter in 1901, who became a mycologist and whose married name was Violet Ashley-Cooper. They lived in Worcester, Worcestershire.

== Career ==
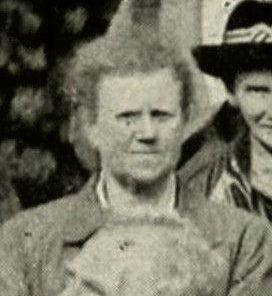
Rea in 1918

Rea was a scientific illustrator. She painted over 1700 illustrations of her husband's collections of fungi and also taught their daughter scientific illustration. An exhibition of her work was held by the Swansea Field Naturalists' Society in Wales. Rea's watercolours are held in the mycology collections at the Royal Botanic Gardens, Kew.

Rea became president of the British Mycological Society in 1915.Her husband served as Secretary. Rea's Presidential Address to the Society was published in the Transactions of the British Mycological Society. She was also a fellow of the Linnean Society of London.

== Gallery ==
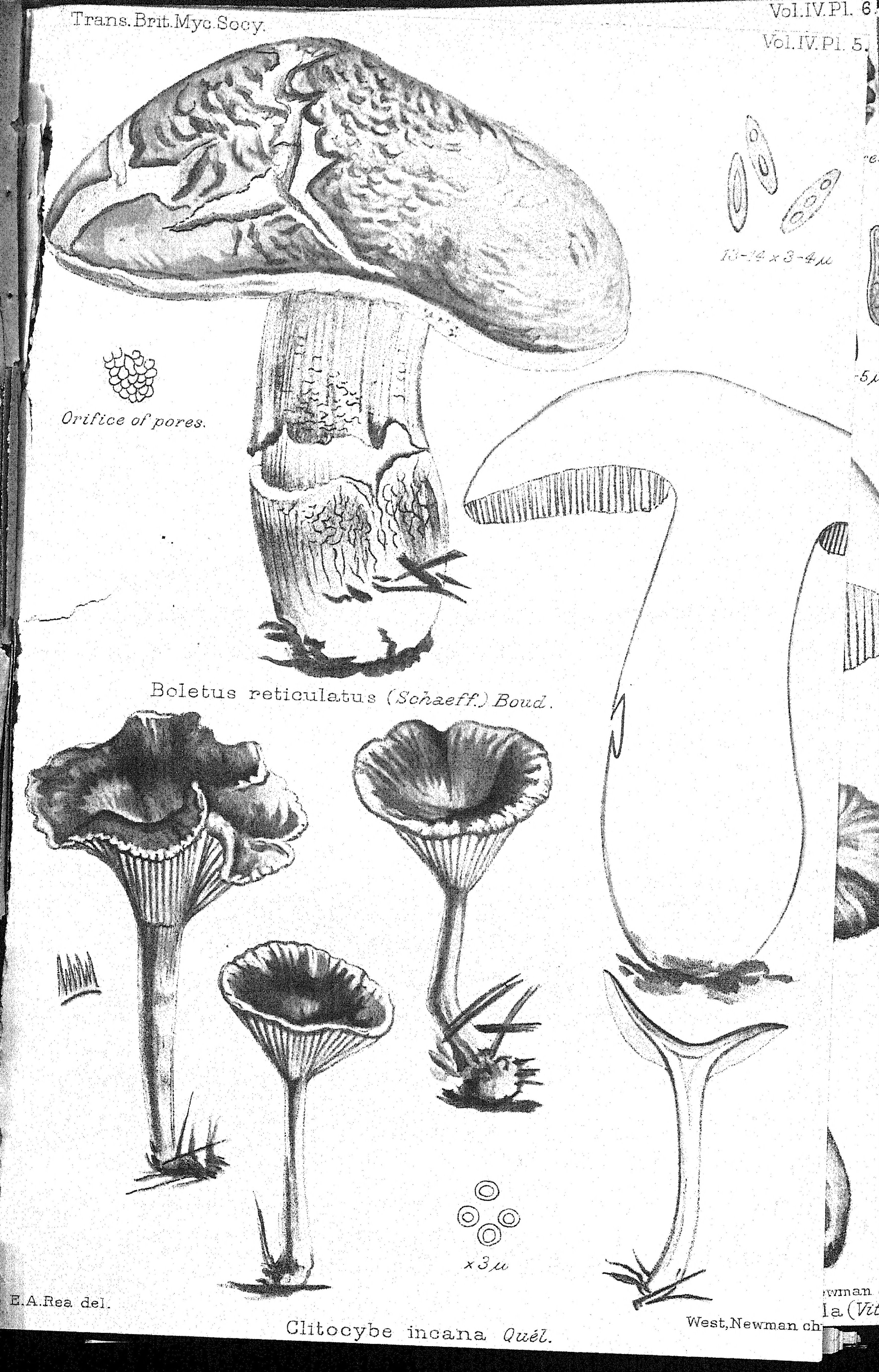
Boletus reticulatus

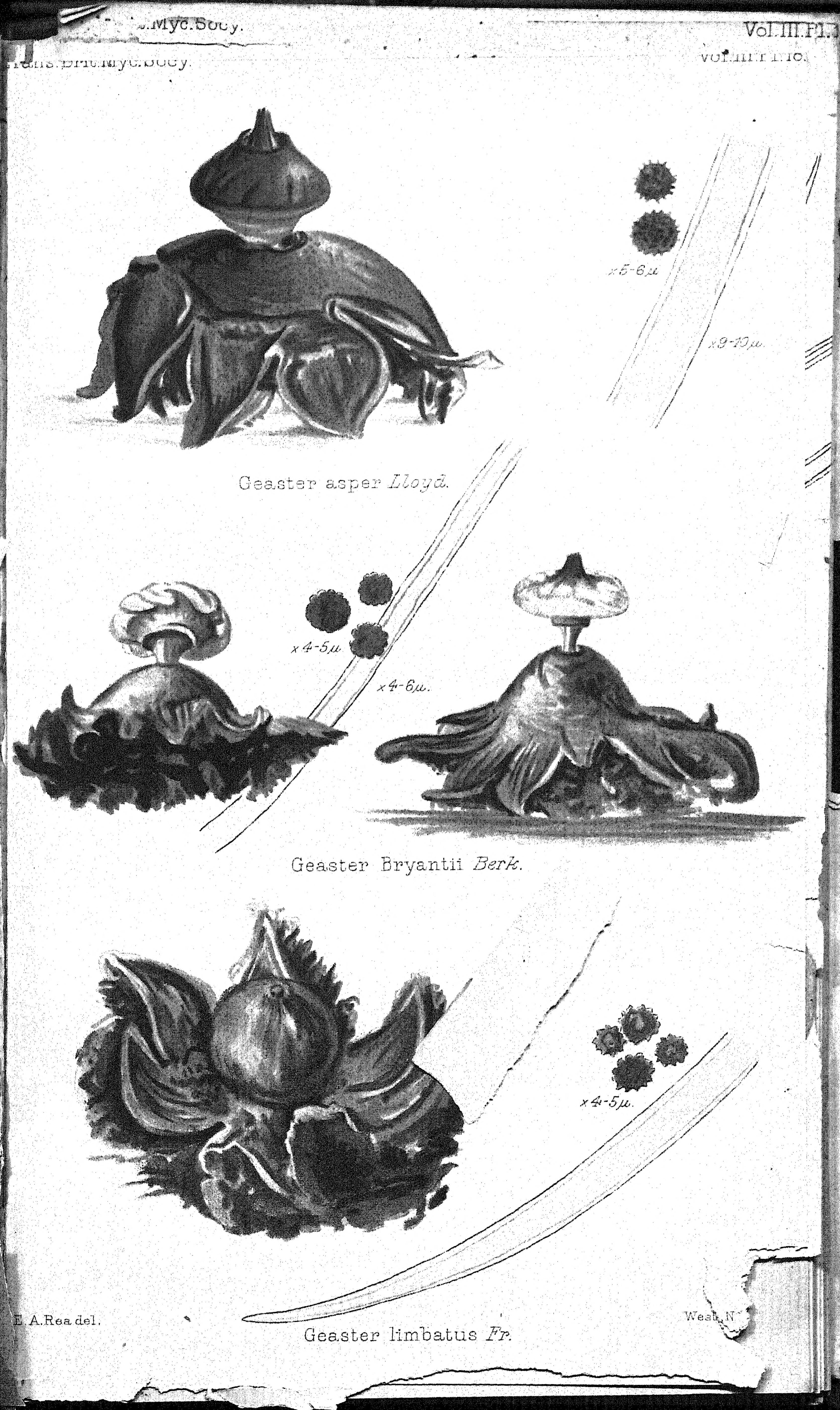
Geaster asper

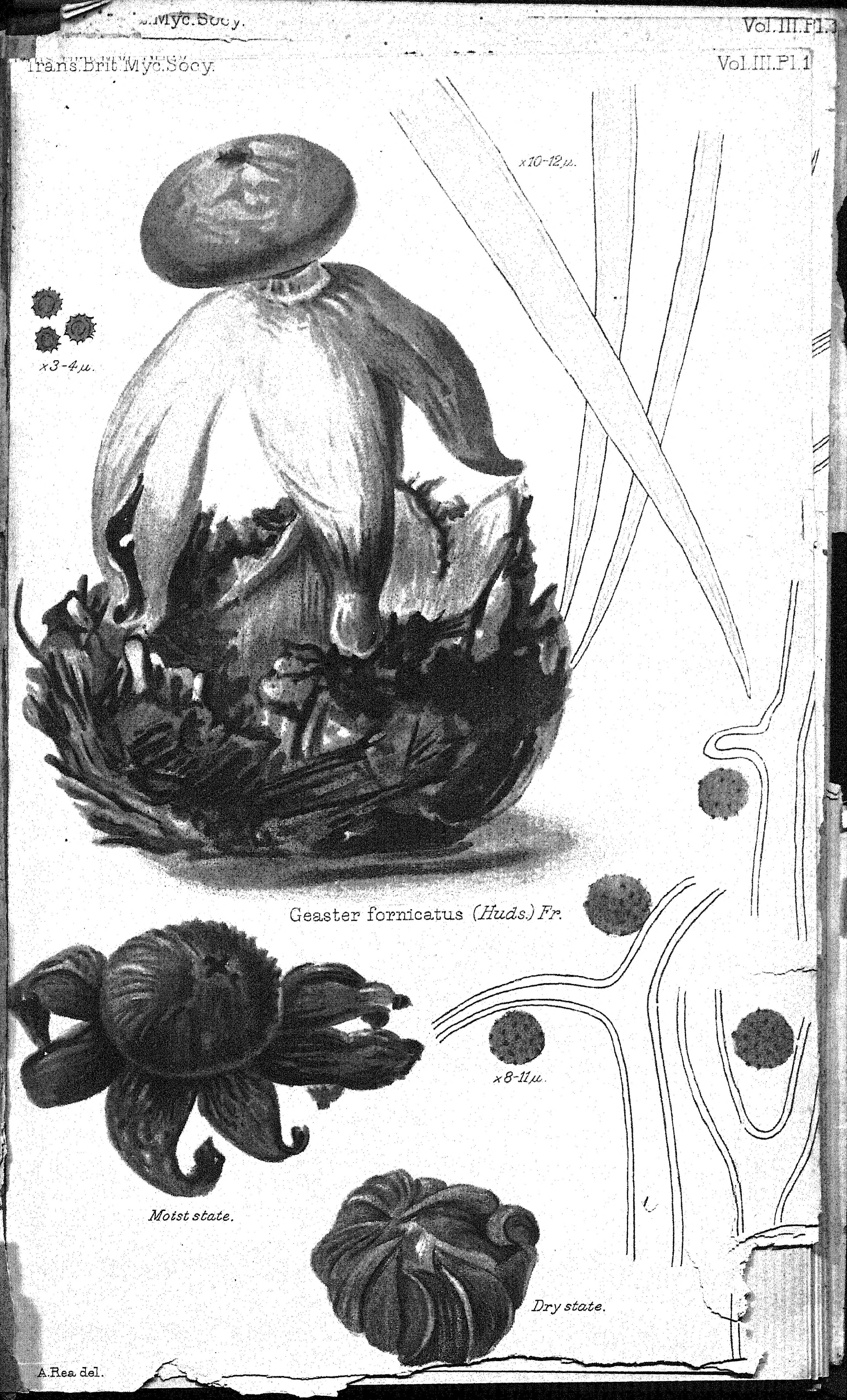
Geaster fornicatus

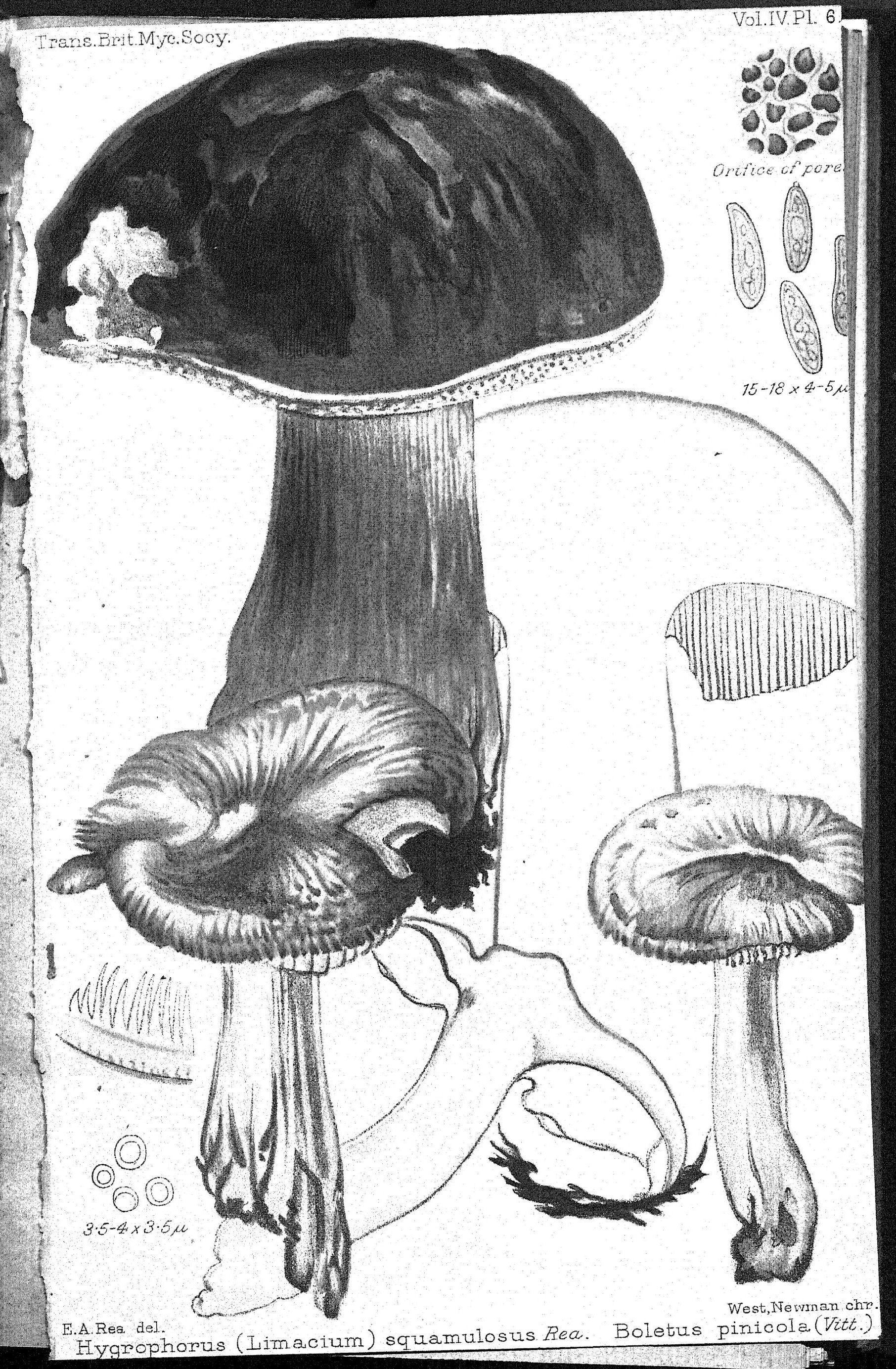
Hygrophorus squamulosus

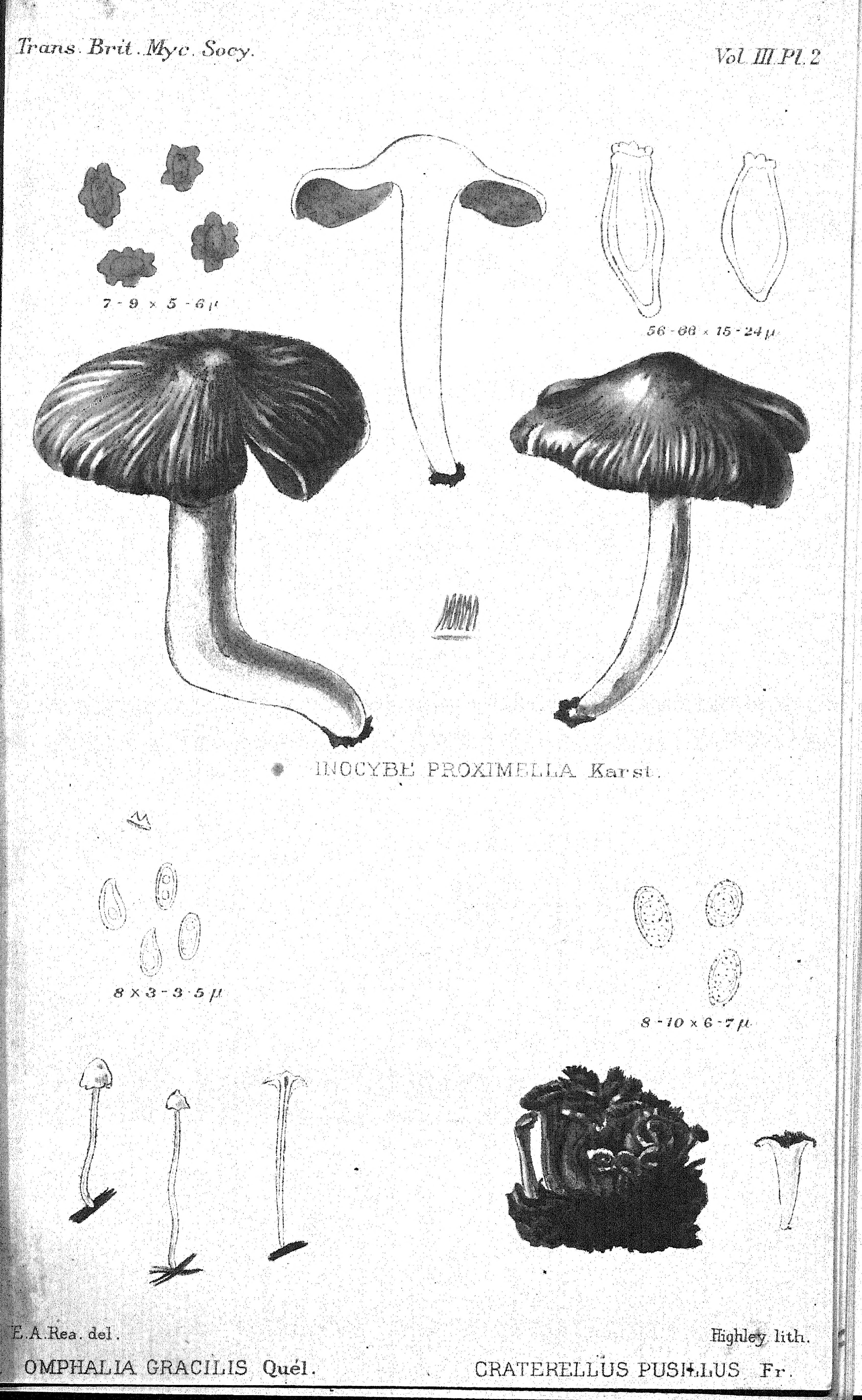
Inocybe proximella

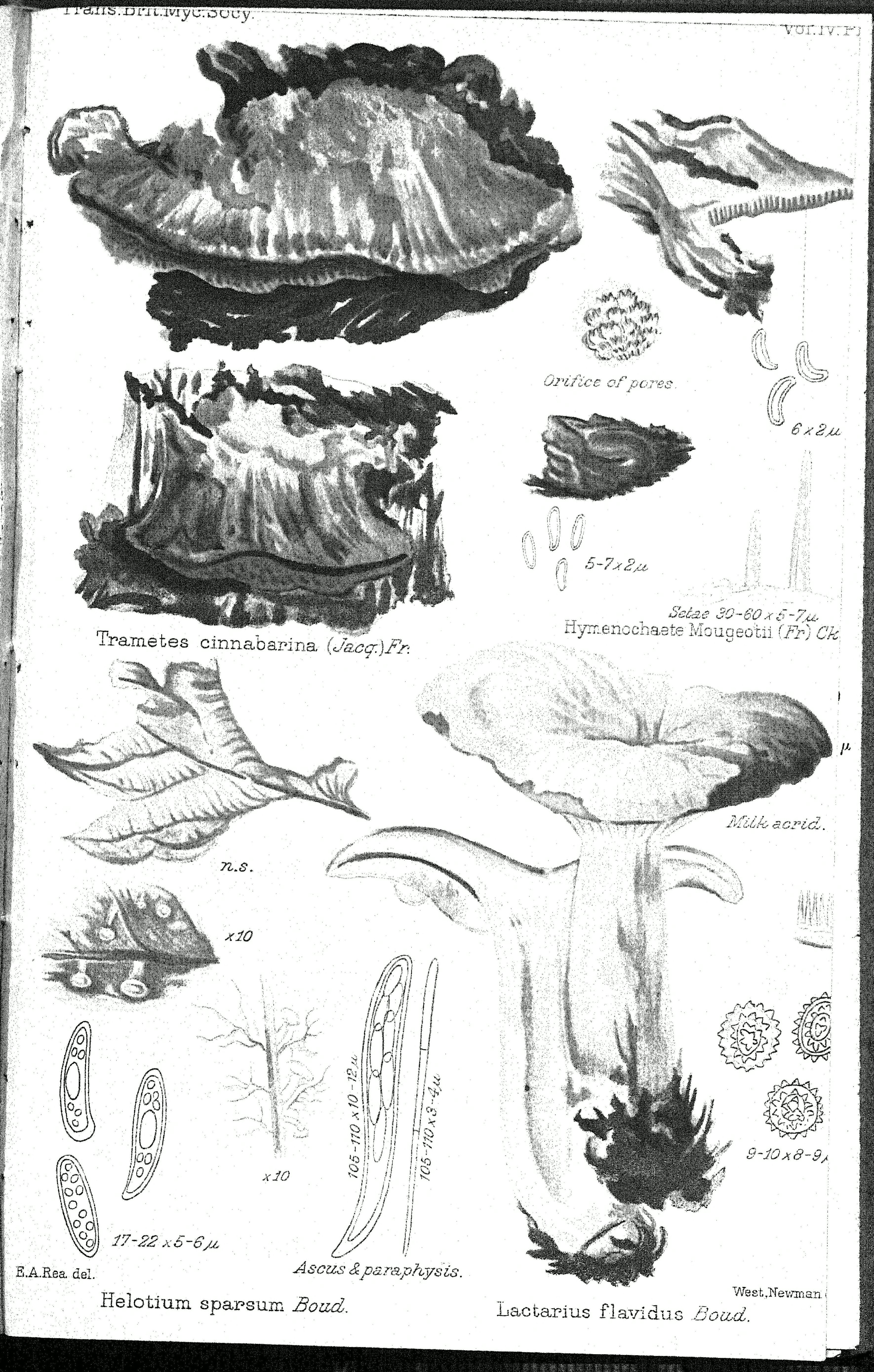
Trametes cinnabarina

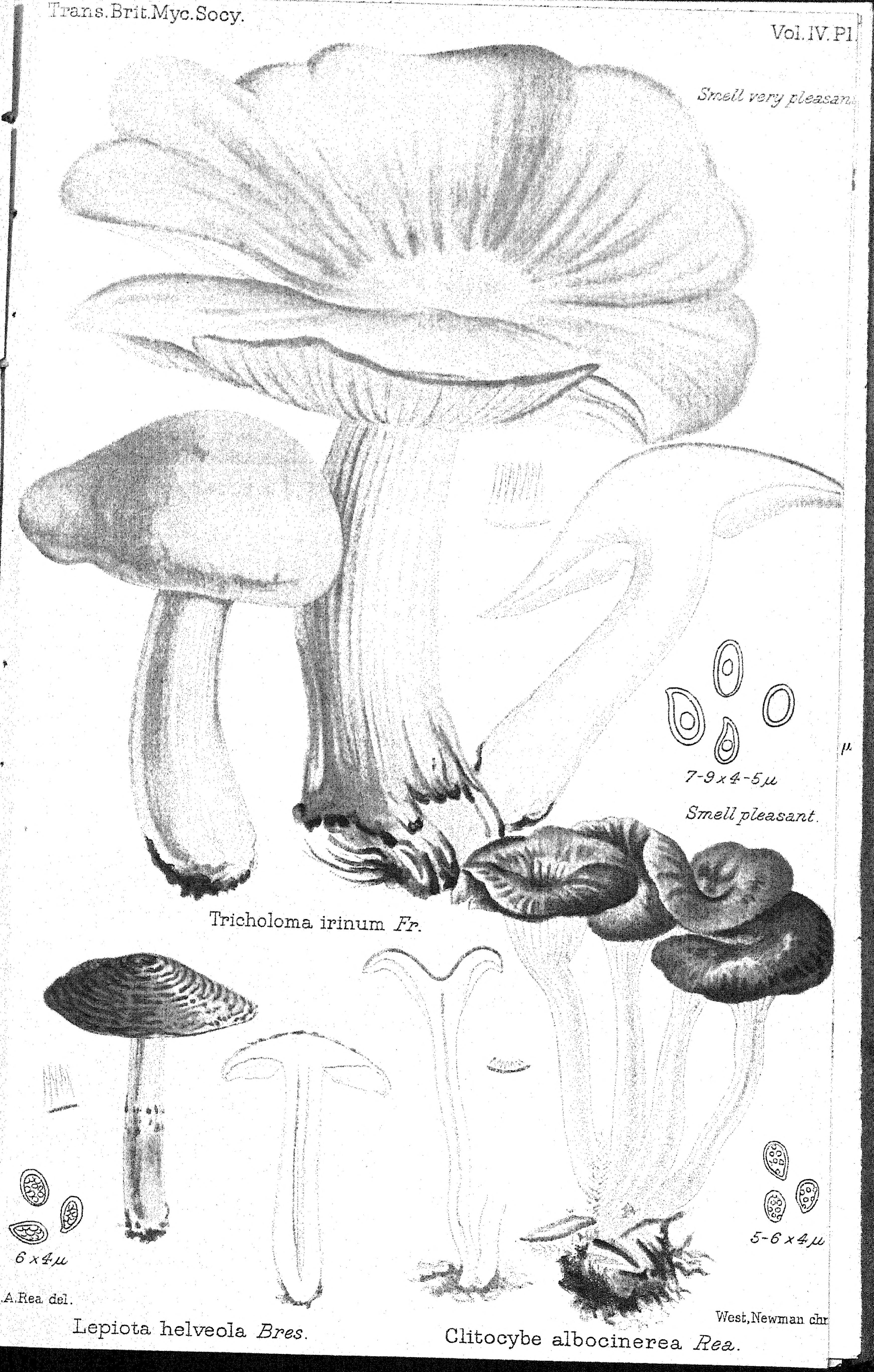
Tricholoma irinum
