= Emmeline Hill =

Irish horse geneticist

Dr Emmeline Hill is an Irish horse geneticist who is credited with discovering a gene for speed in horses.

Dr Hill has published a paper in the peer-reviewed scientific journal PLoS ONE entitled "A sequence polymorphism in MSTN predicts sprinting ability and racing stamina in Thoroughbred horses", which describes the identification of the DNA sequence variant in the horse myostatin gene.

This discovery has major implications for the value of Thoroughbred racehorses and for the global horse breeding industry. It has led to the invention of genetic tests which can predict the racing ability of a horse.

Her grandmother Charmian Hill owned the racehorse Dawn Run.
