= Murder of Emma Walker =

2016 murder in Tennessee, US

- Publicity photo of Emma Walker
- Location: 36.0363°N 83.9767°W; Sterchi Hills, Knoxville, Tennessee, U.S.
- Date: November 21, 2016; 12:00—1:00 a.m. (ET)
- Attack type: Murder, shooting, stalking
- Weapon: 9mm Glock
- Victim: Emma Jane Walker
- Perpetrator: William Riley Gaul
- Motive: Gaul's anger over Walker breaking up with him
- Charges: First-degree murder; Felony murder; Tampering with evidence; Stalking; Reckless endangerment; Possessing a firearm during a dangerous felony; Theft between $500 and $1,000
- Verdict: Guilty of all charges
- Sentence: Life imprisonment with the possibility of parole after 51 years
- Judge: Bobby R. McGee

The murder of Emma Walker occurred on the night of November 21, 2016, in the Sterchi Hills neighborhood in Knoxville, Tennessee. Emma Walker, a high school student, was murdered by her ex-boyfriend William Riley Gaul. Walker died of a gunshot wound to the side of her head, behind her left ear. The case occurred after Walker broke up with him due to his aggressive behavior.

At that time, Walker was a high school cheerleader and Gaul was a college football player. Walker and Gaul were a couple for two years; however, Walker ended the relationship due to its "volatile" nature and Gaul's behavior. According to prosecutors and other witnesses close to the couple, Gaul killed Walker out of anger over the end of their relationship.

Gaul was arrested after two of his friends assisted Sheriff's Detectives with the recovery of the murder weapon and additional physical evidence. Gaul was indicted on seven charges in relation with Walker's murder. In May 2018, the jury found Gaul guilty of all charges. Gaul was immediately sentenced to life in prison without the possibility of parole for 51 years.

Emma Walker's case is considered a notable example of teen dating violence. Walker's murder received international media attention, (Note: Emma Walker murder case was highly publicized in the national media, as well as international media like The Independent.) and was profiled on 20/20, Dateline and the ID Network.

== People involved ==
=== Emma Walker ===
Emma Jane Walker was born on March 20, 2000, in Knoxville, Tennessee, to her parents Jill, an elementary school teacher, and Mark Walker. Walker had a younger brother. In the fall of 2014, she attended Central High School. When Walker started her freshman year, she joined the cheerleading squad. Walker was an honor student and, in addition to the cheerleading team, was a member of Health Occupation Students of America (HOSA), National Beta Club, and Young Life. Emma Walker was a 16-year-old high school junior at the time of the murder.

Walker was described as a "compassionate and kind girl" by her mother, with a lot of friends. Walker planned to study neonatal nursing in college.

=== Riley Gaul ===
William Riley Gaul, better known to go by his middle name Riley, was born in 1998. (Note: William Riley Gaul was eighteen at the time of the murder, being born on August 12, 1998.) Gaul grew up with his mother and grandparents, and attended and graduated from Central High School, where he was a top student and played wide receiver on the football team. Friends described him as “a little on the nerdy side” and a jokester, not the “classic jock” type. Gaul enrolled in and attended Maryville College. At college, Gaul was a Division III college football player. Riley Gaul was an 18-year-old former freshman at that time.

== Relationship with Gaul ==
In the fall of 2014, Walker was a 14-year-old freshman when she met Gaul, who was a 16-year-old junior student. Gaul, who was dating another girl, told Walker that he was breaking up with his girlfriend to date her, even promising to be her prom date. However, he didn't keep his promise and went to the prom with his then-girlfriend. Although Walker didn't like it, she let it go. Shortly after, Gaul and Walker began dating.

At the beginning of their relationship, people close to the couple described Gaul as very attentive and kind to Walker, and they also said that Walker seemed happy with him. Although their relationship seemed "perfect" at first, Walker's friends and relatives began to notice possessive and toxic behavior from Gaul. Gaul didn't like Walker spending time with anyone other than him or doing things he didn't approve of. For two years, Walker and Gaul had an on-and-off relationship. Walker's parents considered the relationship toxic. In October 2016, they grounded Walker and banned her from contacting or continuing the relationship with Gaul.

Eventually, Walker attempted to end her relationship with Gaul in November, but Gaul refused. He sometimes threatened to commit suicide if Walker broke up with him. They eventually ended their relationship, but Gaul continued to contact Walker anonymously. Gaul lied to Walker about being kidnapped in an attempt to make her feel sorry for him and date him again. On November 18, 2016, Gaul allegedly sent an anonymous message to Walker instructing her to leave her house and find him "unconscious" on the street. According to Walker's friends, she was angry and frightened by his deceit. Despite Gaul's continued insistence that he had been kidnapped, Walker did not believe him. Two nights before the incident, a man dressed entirely in black tried to scare Walker.

== Murder ==
On November 18, 2016, Gaul stole a 9mm Glock from under the seat of his grandfather's vehicle. When the gun disappeared, Gaul's grandfather feared he had taken it to commit suicide.

On November 21, 2016, around 12:30 a.m., Gaul headed to Walker's house in the Sterchi Hills neighborhood from his dorm in Maryville College, but not before calling a friend to ask how to 'remove fingerprints' from a gun. Gaul fired two shots from different locations outside the home into the area where Walker's bed was located. One of the gunshots struck the side of her head, killing her. Gaul's roommate said he had been out all night until he returned at approximately 4:45 a.m.

In the morning, at approximately 6 a.m., Walker's mother went to wake her up. When she arrived, she found that her daughter was not breathing and her tongue was sticking out of her mouth. She called 911.

== Investigation ==
That morning, the Sheriff's Deputies were dispatched to the Walker home after a 911 call reported a possible suicide. Lead forensic technician of the Knox County Sheriff's Office (KCSO) discovered a bullet hole in the bedroom wall, leading her to suspect it was not a suicide. When Lead Detective Allen Merritt arrived, he noticed another bullet hole in the wall, about shoulder height, and found two shell casings outside. One bullet struck her behind the left ear, and the other lodged in her pillow. The house was quickly secured as a crime scene.

Detective Merritt and other detectives of the Knox County Sheriff's Office Major Crimes Division began investigating and questioning Walker's family and friends. During interviews, Gaul was frequently mentioned due to his relationship with Walker. A close friend of Gaul, Alex McCarty, informed Merritt that Gaul had stolen a gun from his grandfather the weekend Walker died. When detectives questioned Gaul, he denied showing his grandfather's gun to his friend and claimed he did not have the gun in his possession.

Shortly after, Gaul sent a message to his friends asking them not to talk about this to the detectives anymore. The authorities confirmed that the bullets were from a 9mm Glock, the same missing weapon owned by Gaul's grandfather. McCarty and another friend of Gaul's, Noah Walton, who were convinced Gaul was lying, collaborated with authorities to help recover the murder weapon and other physical evidence.

That day, detectives equipped McCarty and Walton with microphones, a transmitter, and a hidden video camera. Walton invited Gaul to his house under the pretense of playing a video game, and recorded him on camera. During the meeting, Gaul denied killing Walker and suggested that McCarty and Walton tell the detectives they were under the influence of alcohol. Gaul then proposed going to the Bluffs, a wooded area near to a river. They stopped at Gaul's stepfather's house, where Gaul had hidden the gun in the basement, but did not let them see it. Gaul had hidden gloves, trash bags, tennis shoes, black tape, and black clothing inside the same trash bag that contained the gun. The items in the bag were believed to be the same black clothing worn by Gaul. Gaul planned to get rid of the gun so that the authorities could not link it to the murder. After seeing the gun, McCarty exclaimed, "Oh my God! That is a real gun," while Walton notified the authorities. A minute later, Gaul was arrested.

== Criminal proceedings ==
Gaul was indicted with first-degree murder, felony murder, tampering with evidence, stalking, reckless endangerment, possessing a firearm during a dangerous felony and theft between $500 and $1,000, in relation with the killing of Emma Walker. Gaul's family posted his $1 million bail. During the hearing in October 2017, Gaul's defense attorney Wesley Stone asked Judge Bobby R. McGee for more time to prepare his case. The judge granted that motion and postponed the trial date until April 2018.

=== Trial ===
The trial started on April 30, 2018, in the Knox County Criminal Court.

On May 1, Walker's family took the stand to recount the day of the murder. Two of the family's neighbors, the 911 operator who took Jill Walker's call, and one of the investigators on the case also testified.

On May 2, five friends of Walker testified about the day Gaul lied about being kidnapped. They also mentioned that Walker had sent them a text shortly before her killing, describing a man dressed in black who had been near her home. In the text, Walker said she was scared, and thought she was going to die. Gaul's grandfather and stepfather also testified at the trial. Gaul's grandfather confirmed that his gun was a 9mm Glock.

Audio of Jill Walker's 911 call and videos recorded by Gaul's friends were played at the trial.

The defense attorney, Stone, did not deny that Gaul shot Walker, but argued that Gaul was trying to win her back as part of a series of ploys, which included faking his own kidnapping and attempting to pose as Walker's "rescuer". Prosecutors Kevin Allen and Molly Martin stated that Gaul had planned to kill Walker because she broke up with him. They said that Gaul knew exactly where to shoot to ensure the bullets would hit Walker's head.

=== Conviction ===
On May 8, the jury found Gaul guilty of all charges. The charge of stalking with bodily injury and a deadly weapon was reduced to the lesser-included offense of stalking, and the firearm during a dangerous felony charge was reduced to the lesser-included offense of possessing a firearm during a dangerous felony.

Judge McGee immediately sentenced Gaul to life in prison without the possibility of parole for 51 years.

=== Post-conviction ===
In 2021, Gaul requested a new trial based on claims of insufficient evidence, but the motion was denied. Gaul then appealed to the Tennessee Court of Criminal Appeals. In February 2023, the appellate judge ruled to uphold his murder conviction and modified the felony theft conviction.

== Legacy ==
The Health Occupation Students of America (HOSA) and the cheerleading squad at Central High School established a scholarship in Emma Walker's name called the "Emma Walker Memorial Scholarship".

In Knox County, a dog park was named in Walker's honor: the Emma Jane Walker Memorial Dog Park.

The East Tennessee Children's Hospital's neonatal intensive care unit dedicated a room in Walker's honor.

== See also ==
- Crime in Tennessee
- Teen dating violence
