= Ermengarde of Anjou =

Ermengarde of Anjou may refer to:

- Ermengarde-Gerberga of Anjou, Duchess of Brittany, daughter of Geoffrey I, Count of Anjou, wife first of Conan I of Rennes; secondly of William II of Angoulême
- Ermengarde of Anjou, Duchess of Burgundy (1018–1076), daughter of Count Fulk III, wife of Geoffrey, Count of Gâtinais and Robert I, Duke of Burgundy
- Ermengarde de Bourbon-Dampierre (fl. 1070), Countess of Anjou, third wife of Fulk IV, Count of Anjou
- Ermengarde of Anjou (d. 1146) (1068–1146), Duchess of Aquitaine and Brittany, daughter of Count Fulk IV, alleged wife of William IX, Duke of Aquitaine and Alan IV, Duke of Brittany
- Ermengarde, Countess of Maine (1096–1126), Countess of Anjou, first wife of Fulk V
