= Emma Anderson (professor) =

Canadian professor teaching since 2005

Emma Anderson is a Canadian professor teaching since 2005, in the Faculty of Arts Department of Classics and Religious Studies at the University of Ottawa located in Canada's capital Ottawa, Ontario. She is the author of two books. Her area of expertise focuses on relations between Indigenous and Catholic cultures from the early seventeenth century.

== Education ==
Emma Anderson graduated from Carleton University in 1993 with a Bachelor of Arts degree in English literature and religion. She then did her Masters (M.A.) at Harvard Divinity School in Christianity and Culture and graduated in 1998. In 2005, she completed her Ph.D. in Religious Studies, specializing in North American Religious History from Harvard University.

== Career ==
Anderson currently serves as an associate professor at the University of Ottawa in the Department of Classics and Religious Studies. She is also the former Director of the Institute of Canadian and Aboriginal Studies at the University of Ottawa. Anderson began her teaching career at the University of Ottawa after completing her doctorate from Harvard University in 2005. Her primary research focuses on native-Catholic religious interactions in North America in the Seventeenth century; she also works on the Cult of Relics as well as Martyrdom in Colonial Canada. She teaches a wide variety of undergraduate and graduate level courses, including Christian Pilgrimage, Aboriginal Encounters with Christianity, as well as Saints, Visionaries, and Heretics.

== Published works ==
=== Academic books ===
- The Death and Afterlife of the North American Martyrs (Harvard University Press, 2013) ISBN 9780674051188 In 903 libraries according to WorldCat.
- Betrayal of Faith: The Tragic Journey of a Colonial Native Convert (Harvard University Press, 2007) ISBN 9780674026087 In 340 libraries according to WorldCat
  - Also published in French as La trahison de la foi : Le parcours tragique d'un converti autochtone à l'époque coloniale. Presses de l'Université Laval, 2011P

=== Book chapters and journal articles ===
- "'White' Martyrs and 'Red' Saints: The Ongoing Distortions of Hagiography on Historiography"
- "Pilgrims’ Presence: Catholic Continuity in Quebec"
- "The Bekan horn: some new contextual suggestions"
- "Between Conversion and Apostasy: The Religious Journey of Pierre-Anthoine Pastedechouan"
- "'My Spirit found a Unity with this Holy Man:' A Nun's Visions and the Negotiation of Pain and Power in Seventeenth Century New France"
- "Blood, Fire, and 'Baptism': Three Perspectives on the Death of Jean de Brébeuf, Seventeenth-Century Jesuit 'Martyr'"

== Awards and recognition ==
- Best First Book in the History of Religions, American Academy of Religion for Betrayal of Faith: The Tragic Journey of a Colonial Native Convert (2008)
