= Emma Baeri =

Italian essayist

Emma Baeri Parisi
- Born: July 11, 1942 (age 84); Palermo, Italy
- Education: University of Catania
- Occupations: Historian, political scientist
- Children: 2
- Writing career
- Language: Italian
- Years active: 1975–
- Literary movement: Feminism

Emma Baeri (born July 11, 1942) is a Sicilian feminist historian and essayist. She has played an active role in organizing feminist political action and literary life in Italy along with her academic career.

== Biography ==
Emma Baeri was born in Palermo, Italy, the daughter of parents Ernesto Baeri, an electrical engineer, and Maria Parisi. During her childhood she lived in Agrigento, a city she established a strong emotional relationship with, and Piazza Armerina. While still a girl, she moved to Catania with her family in 1951.

In 1960, she earned her high school diploma at the Mario Cutelli Classical Lyceum of Catania. In 1968 she graduated with a degree in political science at the University of Catania with a thesis on the history of political doctrines on education reforms in Sicily in the second half of the eighteenth century. She was a researcher and instructor of modern history in the same faculty from 1972 to 2007.

== Professional political activity ==
Feminism marked a watershed for her political, intellectual, and personal life. In December 1975 she began her political career in the feminist movement: in the "Woman Difference" collective (Differenza Donna) she became conscious of her self; later, she practiced "inside-outside" politics—within the group and in public policy struggles by the Coordination for Women's Self-Determination of Catania in defense of Law 194's abortion rights, for a women's shelter, against sexual violence, for unilateral disarmament when American missiles were placed in Comiso, and then, in the Friday Group, she found a strong political relationship that lasted more than twenty years. Lately, as of 2011, she has participated in the Voltapagina (Page Turners) literary café group.

In 1986, at the conclusion of that revolutionary decade, Emma Baeri launched a close-quarter body-to-body encounter between her woman-body and the corpus of historiography. In 1992 this labor gave birth to I Lumi e il cerchio. Una esercitazione di storia (The Lights and the Circle: An Exercise in History), a text that contaminated the genres—novel, autobiography, historical essay, poetry—entrusting their mutual stridency to the disruptive effect of the unforeseen subject—a woman, her biohistorical experience—in the discourse of historiography. A necessary contamination in the transformation of an orthodox history—engaged in research on the events of a canonical Enlightenment education reformer of eighteenth-century Sicily, Giovanni Agostino De Cosmi—in an unforeseen history, by the inability of the hereditary instruments of work to answer this question: Why are women, although present in history, absent from historiography?

It quickly became clear to me that I must recover the memory of me to go forward, to untangle the thread of my history to find the meaning of history.... In fact, not only was my way of living, my profession transformed, in those years I myself was transformed, within a collective history, and my sense of history was radically adjusted. Time, memory, utopia, and identity were words with a new flavor, which I said, wrote, and loved as though for the first time (I Lumi e il cerchio, pp. 10-11).

In 1989, she was one of the founding members of the Società Italiana delle Storiche (Italian Society of Women Historians), of which she spent two terms in office as a director. In the Society she immediately went to work on the Education Commission, an experience out of which she curated the book Generazioni: Trasmissione della storia e tradizione delle donne (Generations: Transmission of women's history and tradition) from a seminar held by the Society. In 1993, 1995, and 2004 at the Women's History Summer School, first organized by the Society at the Carthusian monastery of Pontignano near Siena, and later in Fiesole. She was a council member of the Unione Femminile Nazionale (National Women's Union) and president and council member of the United Women's Archives of Milan.

Her writings appear in many feminist periodicals, such as Noi donne, DWF: donnawomanfemme, Lapis, Nosside, Il Paese delle Donne, and they testify to her growing interest in the methodology of historical research, in the history of Italian feminism, with particular focus on curating the movement's archives and on the links between feminism and citizenship.

In 1997 Baeri participated with Annarita Buttafuoco in preparing the exhibit Riguardarsi ('looking out for yourself'), a traveling exhibit of manifestos from the women's political movement in Italy. From this experience was born the book Riguardarsi: Manifesti del Movimento Politico delle Donne in Italia.

== Writings ==
Baeri's publications include:

- "Costituzione Articolo Zero: Proposta di Preambolo alla Costituzione della Repubblica Italiana"
- "Desiderio di una Storia, Desiderio di Storia: Esperienze e Riflessioni di Ricerca Didattica e Metodologica"
- "Noi Utopia delle Donne di Ieri, Memoria delle Donne di Domani"
- "Violenza, Conflitto, Disarmo: Pratiche e Riletture Femministe",
- "Cerniere di cittadinanza: Il protagonismo femminile degli anni Settanta",
- "Cittadine in transizione. Spunti di riflessione per una cittadinanza differente",
- "Si può insegnare la passione? A proposito di donne, politica, istituzioni"

In 2012, in a limited, not-for-sale edition, she published Isola mobile: nipoti, gatti, scritti, a "bookish object," as the author calls it, that gathers scattered texts published and unpublished, fragments of memoir, poetic words, and photographs illustrating her three great passions: collages, patchworks, and cats.

I would only like to leaf through these pages to feel the pulsing in my veins, energy of the earth, of Etna, of a woman who's a grandmother, a researcher of stories likely to be impostures... and with cats always around. (Baeri, Isola mobile, p. 16)

In 2013 she published Dividua, whose back cover reads:

From two words—feminism and citizenship—apparently at least two centuries apart, is born a new word, "Dividual," the Other of the Individual, (Note: "Dividua, l'Altra dell'Individuo"—literally '(female) Dividual, the (female) Other of the (male) Individual') from today and always subjects recognizable in their reciprocal difference, together for a new civil pact that is equal, different, diverse. So thinks Emma Baeri, a feminist from the beginning, a feminist historian, who in this book ties together her various writings from the late 1990s till today, with a cord that is also her vexation: the nexus, and the necessary friction, between emancipation and liberation, between rights and women's freedom. And she does it with an expressive freedom that means to point out even in its form the feminist angle: poetry and prose, story and diary tell of the emotional, cultural, and sociable contexts that have accompanied the birth of an etymologically transgressive thought, which has the presumption to take a further step, beyond the usual meaning of politics, history, and the inherited words that they still speak. At the end, an affectionately hazarded bet: she asks two young women with differing ideas of feminism, Elena Caruso Raciti and Antonia Cosentino Leone: "What do you think of this?"

== Personal life ==
Baeri is married and has two daughters, Maria Carla and Paola; three grandchildren, Gabriele, Lorenzo, and Anna; and an extended feline family.

== Bibliography ==
- Emma Baeri, I Lumi e il Cerchio (The lights and the circle). Rome: Editori Riuniti, 1992; reprinted by Rubbettino Editore, 2008. ISBN 9788849823783.
- Emma Baeri and Annarita Buttafuoco (eds.), Riguardarsi: Manifesti del movimento politico delle donne in Italia. Anni '70-'90 (To look out for yourself: manifestos of the women's political movement in Italy, 1970s–1990s). Siena: Protagon, 1997. ISBN 88-8024-028-5. A partial digital version is at Riguardarsi.
- Emma Baeri and Sara Fichera (eds.), Inventari della memoria: L'esperienza del Coordinamento per l'Autodeterminazione della Donna a Catania, 1980–1985 (Inventories of memory: the experience of the Coordination for Women's Self-Determination in Catania, 1980–1985). Milan: FrancoAngeli, 2001. ISBN 9788846430588.
- Emma Baeri, Isola mobile (nipoti, gatti, scritti) (Moving island: grandchildren, cats, writings). Catania: Giuseppe Maimone Editore, 2012.

== See also ==
- Feminism in Italy
- Herstory
- History of feminism
