= George Bard Ermentrout =

American mathematician

G. Bard Ermentrout
- Born: March 5, 1954
- Citizenship: United States of America
- Education: University of Chicago (Ph.D.)
- Known for: Mathematical neuroscience
- Scientific career
- Workplaces: University of Pittsburgh
- Thesis: Symmetry Breaking in Homogeneous, Isotropic Stationary Neuronal Nets (1979)
- Doctoral advisor: Jack D. Cowan
- Website: www.pitt.edu/~phase/

G. Bard Ermentrout is an American mathematician and distinguished professor at University of Pittsburgh and a member of the Odor2Action research network. He uses nonlinear dynamics for the mathematical modeling of problems in neuroscience. He explores patterns of activation in neural systems as they relate to biological problems such as olfaction.

Bard Ermentrout is known for his contributions to computational and mathematical neuroscience. His joint work with Nancy Kopell derived the Ermentrout and Kopell canonical model, He and David Terman wrote the book Mathematical Foundations of Neuroscience. He helped to develop the dynamical systems software XPPAuto.

One approach he uses in the study of olfaction is to program a virtual creature, implement various movement strategies for tracking scents, and examine their success rate under a different conditions. This enables researchers to better understand olfactory navigation strategies such as tropotaxis and klinotaxis and how they work in conditions such as high turbulence.

Outside of work, he is fond of his many pets and has owned many pet parrots over the years. He most recently owns a galah and two corgis. He is also a lover of limericks.
