= Emma Smith Kennedy =

American writer

Emma Belle Smith Kennedy or "Emma Kennedy" (17 March 1869 – 3 May 1960) was a granddaughter of Joseph Smith, Jr., and daughter of his third surviving son, Alexander Hale Smith. In her lifetime she was highly regarded in the Reorganized Church of Jesus Christ of Latter Day Saints (RLDS Church) for several reasons. First, she was one of the earliest Latter Day Saints to return to Independence, Missouri, after the American Civil War, when Latter Day Saints still faced some endangering prejudices. Second, she was the first librarian for the historic RLDS Stone Church, and a regular contributor or commentator for the Saints' Herald church magazine. Third, as with her grandfather, her uncle Joseph Smith III, her father, and other relatives in the Latter Day Saint movement, Kennedy produced a number of writings, revelations and prophecies which circulated among church membership. A month before her eightieth birthday in 1949, Kennedy wrote in a letter to a relative:

I just am very much alive in the onward march of this church of ours and have a gift that helps many, the gift of prophecy. I have foretold some things and they have come to pass...It sounds rather boasting but I was told in prophecies I would do this work, as a portion of the mantle of my father had fallen on me and I must to comfort God's people. So I am very busy the most of my time.

Among other prophetic statements, she is credited with successfully predicting in mid-1947 that her Independence neighbor Harry S Truman would win the U.S. presidential election of 1948, even though prevailing opinion of the era was that Truman would probably lose.

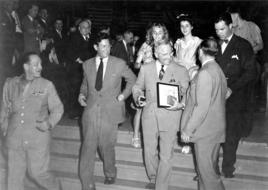
President Truman departing the RLDS Auditorium on June 27, 1945.

I bid thee write on this 1st day of June, 1947. My hand is over Latter Day Israel and My land. In the change coming at the seat of Government there will be no other man in control of this nation (the elections) than he who is now there .... He is a wise man and a prayerful servant and heeds the guiding hand of the Lord with the light that is his ... To my people, I would say, have more faith in the hand that rules the nation.

Two of Emma Smith Kennedy's earlier "inspired writings" are contained in the book Infallible Proofs, first published circa 1931. Also published in that book is a revelation produced by her father in 1900 which helps illustrate complicated dynamics involved among different Latter Day Saint factions in Independence Missouri in the early 20th century.

Later revelations produced by Mrs. Kennedy are more specific than those examples, a prophecy entitled "Given Through The Spirit to Emma Smith Kennedy February 25, 1944" reads:

Oh My child do not doubt what thou hast received, for in a few days as man numbers them, thou shalt know the Red Army has entered Germany through Poland, yet at this time Poland is longing to be at peace, but weakened through Germany's treatment—a great fear is there. Yet Russia will go in Germany first with her powerful arm, then the Allies will come upon Germany and the Nazis will yield, but not 'til great slaughter within their ranks. France will gain much ground and courage, she shall conduct herself in great battlefront. Men have grown weary, and if thy Father did not strengthen the men of battle, the war would be prolonged and no good would come.

From her obituary published in the local newspaper: "Mrs. Kennedy was born in Plano, Illinois ... She had lived in Independence since she was a little girl. She was married to William Kennedy, a Canadian, in 1887 in Harrison County, Missouri. Mr. Kennedy was a blacksmith. Surviving are a daughter ... a brother ... a sister ... three grandchildren and eight great-grandchildren."

Kennedy is mentioned in the August 1992 edition of the Ensign magazine, an official periodical of the Church of Jesus Christ of Latter-day Saints (LDS Church), in an article about Emma Hale Smith by Emma Belle Smith Kennedy's granddaughter, Gracia N. Jones, an author and genealogist active in the LDS Church:

A granddaughter Emma Belle Smith Kennedy, remembers Emma Smith: 'Her eyes were brown and sad. She would smile with her lips but to me, as small as I was, I never saw the brown eyes smile. I asked my mother one day, why don't Grandma laugh with her eyes like you do and my mother said because she has a deep sorrow in her heart.'
