= Emma Aline Osgood =

American opera singer

Emma Aline Osgood (1849-1911) was an American soprano remembered for her performances in oratorio.

Osgood was born in Boston in 1849. Early in life, she married Dr. Osgood, a physician of Boston. Her first appearance in public was made in Boston, when she was so successful that she was engaged for two years to sing in Canada and the United States. In 1875, she went to England to study oratorio, and made her debut at The Crystal Palace in the same year, but did not appear again till 1876, when she accompanied Charles Hallé on a provincial tour, and gained her reputation as a vocalist. In this year, she also won praise as the soprano in Liszt's new oratorio "Saint Elizabeth," and at the Crystal Palace, sang frequently selections from Wagner's "Tristan und Isolde," and Gounod's classical compositions. In March. 1878, Osgood visited the US, and appeared with acceptance at Theodore Thomas's concerts in New York City, at Cincinnati, and in Canada. She returned to England in the autumn of 1878, sang at the Shakespeare memorial festival at Stratford-upon-Avon in June 1879, and at Christmas, in Liverpool in Sir Arthur Sullivan's " Light of the World." In 1880, she appeared at the state concert at Buckingham Palace, and in August of that year, she revisited the US and made a successful tour. Since 1875 she resided principally in England.

== Biography ==
Emma Aline Osgood was born in Boston, Massachusetts, circa 1852. Her family was eminently musical, and her father had a rich basso voice, while the full toned contralto of her mother was known throughout the New England area close to their home. She began singing here in the choirs at church on Sundays.

Her first appearance in public was in Boston, when in 1873, she sang with the Beethoven Quintette Club. Being very successful in her first efforts, the Club engaged her for a tour through Canada, and for two years she sang with the Club in various parts of that country, and in the US. It was not until February, 1875, that she decided to come to England to study oratorio. On her arrival in England, Osgood's whole attention was devoted to the study of oratorio, but it was not until some time later that she made her first success in it. In October, 1875, she made her first appearance at The Crystal Palace, but she did not again appear until early in 1876, when she fulfilled several engagements with Charles Hallé in the provinces. She sang with success at Manchester, Wolverhampton, Liverpool, Birmingham, and other cities of England.

Around 1869, Walter Bache produced at St James's Hall, a new oratorio by Listz, entitled "Saint Elizabeth." Madame Titiens took the soprano part. The result was a dismal and complete failure. From that time to 1876, this oratorio was prudently laid on the shelf, but in 1876, Walter Bache decided on giving it one more trial, and he fixed on Osgood for the soprano part. On the night of production, the house was packed with critics, musicians and vocalists, all come to witness another failure. There was no doubt in the minds of the audience that they were about to see a second catastrophe of this ill-fated oratorio. The issue, however, was a success for Osgood. The press were unanimous in their praise, and all predicted a fine career for the young soprano.

During this year, Osgood sang often at the Crystal Palace, her favourite selections being motives from Wagner's "Tristan und Isolde" and other works by the same composer, as also some of Gounod's more classical compositions. She sang at the Brighton Festival in the spring of 1877, with Madame Patey, and Signor Foli, in Verdi's "Requiem;" and also at Liverpool at the Philharmonic Concert, and later in 1877, where Verdi's "Requiem" was again given, with Annie Williams in the second soprano part. At Exeter Hall, Osgood sang in most of the principal oratorios, "Messiah," "Creation," "St. Paul," with much success. She also sang for the first time in Boosey's ballad concert, and brought out Sullivan's melodious ballad, and "My Dearest Heart". In the autumn of this year, she sang for the first time at the Leeds Festival in "Samson," "The Creation," and in Austin's " Fire King."

Early in 1878, Cowen's "Deluge" was given at the Brighton Festival, with Beethoven's "Mount of Olives." In both of these oratorios Osgood sang. In March, she went to the US, and sang at the Festival of Cincinnati, and Worcester, and in Canada, twice in oratorio, and also in Theodore Thomas's concerts in New York. Returning to London in the autumn, Osgood sang at Christmas, in Liverpool, in the "Messiah," and in many other concerts. In the summer of 1878, she was engaged for the State concert held at Buckingham Palace, but the death of the Queen of the Netherlands caused the concert to be postponed.

During 1879, she sang in concerts given by Messrs. Metzler & Chappell of London, in opposition to Boosey's older entertainment, and also in concerts of Lady Lindsay and Mr. Bethune. In March, was produced at Cambridge, Alberto Randegger's " Fridolin," which was given with much success. From February to June, she sang many times in concerts and oratorios. The most notable performances were at Kuhe's Festival in February, when Beethoven's "Mount of Olives" was again given. Osgood sang Randegger's "Medea," at St. James's Hall, for the Philharmonic Society. In June was given the Shakespeare Memorial Festival at Stratford-upon-Avon, where she sang, with other things, Bishop's setting to "When the Cold Winds Blow." At Christmas, 1879, Osgood again sang at Liverpool in "The Light of the World," by Sullivan.

During 1880, Osgood sang at Charles Halle's concert at Manchester; at St. James' Hall in the Bach choir concerts; in Joseph Hatton's reading, when she sang Sullivan's "My Dearest Heart," and Cowen's setting to "The Better Land". Up to her second visit to the US in August, 1880, the whole of Osgood's time was occupied; she sang at Mann's concerts, and in the aria, "Gliicklein im Thale," and in Weber's " Euryanthe". At a concert in Exeter Hall, she sang a new song composed expressly for her, entitled "Two by Two," by Nicola Ferri, and was encored several times. Osgood made her greatest hit in 1881 at the State concert given at Buckingham Palace on June 2, in an aria from "Tristan and Isolde," of Wagner, in a trio with Albani and Patey, and in a quartette from "Martha," with Patey, Guyarri, and Lasscalle. Osgood was also chosen to sing a verse from "God save the Queen," striking the top B flat with great exactness and effect.

It was said that Osgood's voice was perfect throughout its entire range; every note was distinct, full, and rich. But her especial feature was the depth of ringing tone of her lower notes, which gave her great advantage over other oratorio sopranos. Osgood also excelled in ballad music, in which she was very successful. She died in 1911 in Philadelphia.

== Bibliography ==
- Colburn, Henry (1881). Colburn's New Monthly Magazine (Public domain ed.). Henry Colburn.
- Pratt, Waldo Selden (1920). American Music and Musicians (Public domain ed.). T. Presser Company.
- Wilson, James Grant; Fiske, John (1888). Appleton's Cyclopædia of American Biography. Vol. 4 (Public domain ed.). D. Appleton.
