= Erminethrudis =

6th century Frankish abess

- Died: c. 600; Paris
- Other names: Ermintrude
- Children: ≈ 2
- Family: Merovingian dynasty

Erminethrudis (died c. 600), was a nun and a member of the Merovingian aristocracy who died in Paris about 600, leaving a will which survived as a rare example from the period.

The testament of Erminethrudis serves as a rare example of some conditions of a woman in the aristocracy in this time period, as only nuns or widows left wills in their own capacity, of which few survive. She owned two villas in Lagny-sur-Marne and Bobigny and at least 13 separate vineyards in this area east of Paris, leaving properties to the Basilica of Saint-Denis and other basilicas.

She had been married and had children before joining her religious order. Her son, Deorovaldus, had been buried in St Symphorien of Paris before her death.

She also had a surviving son to whom she left clothing and other possessions. She left individual items of gold jewelry to four Parisien basilicas and freed a number of unfree workers from her lands. The religious gifts were designed to ensure prayers being said for her and her son in perpetuity.
