= Irmgard =

Irmgard is a feminine German given name. Notable people with the name include:

- Saint Irmgardis or Irmgard (1000–1065 or 1082/1089)
- Irmgard of Berg (fl. 12th century), German noble, daughter of Adolf VI, Count of Berg
- Irmgard of Chiemsee (c. 831/833 – 16 July 866)
- Irmgard of Cleves (c. 1307–1362), German noble, wife of John IV, Lord of Arkel
- Irmgard Bartenieff (1900–1981), German dance theorist, dancer, choreographer and physical therapist
- Irmgard Bensusan (born 1991), South African paralympic sprinter
- Irmgard Brendenal-Böhmer, German rower
- Irmgard Enderle (1895–1985), German politician, trade unionist and journalist
- Irmgard Farden Aluli (1911–2001), Hawaiian composer
- Irmgard Flügge-Lotz (1903–1974), German-American mathematician, aerospace engineer, and control theorist
- Irmgard Fuest (1903–1980), German lawyer and politician
- Irmgard Furchner (1925–2025), German convicted concentration camp secretary
- Irmgard Griss (born 1946), Austrian lawyer and judge, former President of the Supreme Court of Justice
- Irmgard Hermann (1942–2020), German actress
- Irmgard Huber (1901–1983), German head nurse of the Hadamar Clinic during the Nazi era
- Irmgard Kärner (1927–2014), German chess player
- Irmgard Karwatzki (1940-2007), German politician and social worker
- Irmgard Keun (1905–1982), German novelist
- Irmgard Krauser (born 1948), German gymnast
- Irmgard Lanthaler, Italian luger
- Irmgard Latz (born 1939), German badminton player
- Irmgard Litten (1879–1953), German writer
- Irmgard Lukasser (born 1954), Austrian alpine skier
- Irmgard Möller (born 1947), former member of the German terrorist group the Red Army Faction (RAF)
- Irmgard Neumann (1925–1989), East German politician
- Irmgard Oepen (1929–2018) German physician and writer
- Irmgard Praetz (1920–2008), German track and field athlete
- Irmgard Riessen (born 1944), German actress
- Irmgard Sames (1914-?), German long track speed skater
- Irmgard Schmelzer (1921–2002), German track and field athlete
- Irmgard Schwaetzer (born 1942), German politician and Protestant church official
- Irmgard Seefried (1919–1988), German soprano
- Irmgard Sörensen-Popitz (1896–1993), German graphic designer
- Irmgard Trojer (born 1964), Italian track and field athlete

== See also ==
- 591 Irmgard, a minor planet
- Ermengarde
