= Emma Bartoniek =

Hungarian historian

Emma Bartoniek (28 November 1894 – 31 May 1957) was a Hungarian historian and bibliographer who specialised in medieval history, primarily the age of the Árpád dynasty (c. 895–1301).

== Early life and education ==
Emma Bartoniek was born in Budapest as the daughter of physician and educator Géza Bartoniek and Ilona Szumrák. Her brother Emil Bartoniek became a physician and instructor. He died fighting in World War I.

Bartoniek got a Master of Arts degree at Budapest University in 1917.

== Career ==
Between 1916 and 1934 Emma Bartoniek was an apprentice and librarian at the National Széchényi Library. Meanwhile, she was also the guest researcher of the Hungarian Historical Institute at Vienna between 1925 and 1926.

After her apprenticeship, she was the manager of the Library's manuscripts collection from 1934. She was dismissed from her job in 1945. Bartoniek was the committee member of the Hungarian Historical Society from 1933 and the Hungarian Armorial and Genealogical Association from 1935.

Emma Bartoniek worked on the history of royal coronations between 895 and 907, examining the problems of the 10-13th century Hungarian succession. Her ascertainments about the first Hungarian laws and legends from the age of Árpád are particularly valuable. Bartoniek published the catalogue of the National Széchényi Library's Latin codices. Her work about the Hungarian historiography remained in manuscript form.

== Major works ==
- Codices manuscripti latini. Vol. 1. Codices latini medii aevi. Bp., 1940.
- Fejezetek a XVI–XVII. századi magyarországi történetírás történetéből. Bp., 1975.
- A koronázási eskü fejlődése 1526-ig. Századok, 1917.
- A magyar királyválasztáshoz. Századok, 1923.
- Az Árpádok trónöröklési joga. Századok, 1926. (1934.)
- A magyar királykoronázások története. Bp., 1939.

== Literature ==
- Csapodi Csaba: Bartoniek Emma. Magyar Könyvszemle, 1957.
- Mezey László: Bartoniek Emma. Századok, 1958.
- Szilágyi Ágnes Judit: Érdekes személyiségek, emlékezetes viták a magyar történetírásban, 27 történészportré, Budapest, Palatinus, 2007. 95-100. p.
