= Emma Norton (lawyer) =

UK armed forces lawyer

Emma Norton, a British lawyer specialising in service personnel's rights, is the Director of the legal charity, the Centre for Military Justice, , a charity she founded in 2019 with Des James, the father of Pte Cheryl James who died at Deepcut Barracks, and retired Brig John Donnelly, the former head of Army Personal Services Group. She was the head of legal case work at Liberty, an advocacy group. She has represented many female soldiers who have had their claims of sexual assault ignored or mishandled, as well as bereaved families of women in the armed forces. She acted for three of the four Deepcut families whose children died amid allegations of bullying, abuse and neglect at Deepcut barracks between 1995 and 2001. She sits on the Human Rights Committee of the Law Society.

Norton represented the family of the late Jaysley Beck, a gunner in the British Army who died after sexual assault and sexual harassment. An inquest into Jaysley's death found that the Army's failings in the handling of Jaysley's sexual assault allegation contributed to her death . She acted for former soldiers Kerry-Ann Knight and Dwight Pile-Gray who experienced serious racial discrimination in the Army, and the sisters of Cpl. Anne-Marie Ellement at the inquest into her death, where the coroner ruled that an alleged rape and bullying were factors in her suicide. She also represents the family of the late Pte Tony Harrison, a young paratrooper murdered by the IRA in 1991 in their efforts to secure accountability for his killing. . She lectures twice a year at the Defence Academy on human rights, discrimination and the armed forces.
