= Ermengarde =

Ermengarde or Ermengard or Ermingarde or Irmingard or Irmgard is a feminine given name of Germanic origin derived from the Germanic words "ermen/irmin," meaning "whole, universal" and "gard" meaning "enclosure, protection". Armgarð is a Faroese version. It is the name of various historical women:

- Ermengarde of Hesbaye (778–818), wife of Louis the Pious
- Irmgard of Chiemsee (died 866), also known as Ermengard, daughter of Louis the German, remembered in the calendar as a saint
- Ermengarde of Anjou (disambiguation), multiple people
- Ermengarde of Tonnerre (1032–1083), wife of William I, Count of Nevers
- Ermengarde of Narbonne (1127/29–1197), Viscountess of Narbonne
- Ermengarde de Beaumont (1170–1234), wife of William I of Scotland
- Ermengard of Provence (died 896/97), wife of Boso of Provence
- Ermengard of Tours (died 851), wife of Lothair I
- Ermengarde of Auvergne, mother of William I of Aquitaine
- Ermengarde of Burgundy (c. 970–after 1057), wife of Gilbert, Duke of Burgundy
- Ermengarde of Tuscany (901–931/932), wife of Adalbert I of Ivrea
- Ermengarde of Maine (died 1126), wife of Fulk V of Anjou
- Ermengarde of Zutphen (died 1138), mother of Henry I, first count of Guelders and Zutphen
- Princess Irmingard of Bavaria (1923–2010)
