= Ademar =

- Gender: Male
- Language: Frankish/Old French

Other names
- Variant forms: Adhemar, Ademir, Aymer
- Derived: Audamar

Ademar is a masculine Germanic name, ultimately derived from Audamar, as is the German form Otmar. It was in use in medieval France, Latinized as Adamarus or Ademarus, and in modern times has been popular in French, Spanish and Portuguese-speaking countries. A feminine form Adamardis seems to have been in use from the 10th century, reduced to Aanord, Aenor by the 12th.

In the Portuguese language, Ademar is the current spelling, Adhemar being an archaic version of the name.

Notable people with this name include:

== Medieval ==
Ordered chronologically

- Adhemar of Salerno, also spelled Ademar, Prince of Salerno from 853 to 861
- Aymar I of Angoulême (died 926), Count of Poitiers and Count of Angoulême
- Aymer, Count of Angoulême (c. 1160–1202), also spelled Ademar and Adhemar
- Adémar de Chabannes (988/989–1034), French monk, composer, scribe, historian, poet, grammarian and literary forger
- Ademar Jordan (died 1212), French knight
- Aymar of Lairon (died 1219), also spelled Adémar, Lord of Caesarea and Marshal of the Knights Hospitaller
- Ademar lo Negre (fl. 1210–1219), French troubadour
- Ademar de Peiteus, Count of Valentinois and de facto ruler of Diois from 1188 or 1189 to 1230
- Ademar de Rocaficha (c. 1200?), French troubadour

== Modern ==
- Ademar Benítez (born 1956), Uruguayan footballer
- Ademar Braga (football manager) (born 1945), Brazilian football manager
- Ademar Braga (footballer) (born 1976), Brazilian footballer
- Ademar Caballero (1918–1982), Brazilian swimmer
- Ademar Frederico Duwe (1938–2021), Brazilian politician and businessman
- Ademar Fonseca (1963–2017), Brazilian football manager
- Ademar José Gevaerd (1962–2022), Brazilian ufologist
- Ademar Jürlau (1907–1995), Estonian middle-distance runner
- Ademar Kammler (born 1970), Brazilian racewalker
- Ademar Marques (born 1959), Portuguese footballer
- Adhemar Martins 1900–?), Brazilian footballer known as Japonês
- Ademar Pantera (1941–2001), Brazilian footballer
- Ademar José Ribeiro (1940–1992), Brazilian footballer commonly known as Dé
- Ademar Rifaela (born 1994), Dutch-Curaçaoan baseball player
- Ademar Rodríguez (born 1990), Mexican footballer
- Ademar dos Santos Batista (born 1983), Brazilian footballer
- Ademar Tavares Júnior (born 1980), Brazilian footballer
- Ademar Xavier (born 1985), Brazilian footballer

== See also ==
- Guilhem Ademar (died 1217), French troubadour
- CB Ademar León, Spanish handball team
