= Ademar Braga =

Ademar da Silva Braga may refer to:

- Ademar Braga (football manager) (born 1945), Brazilian football manager
- Ademar Braga (footballer) (born 1976), Brazilian footballer
