= Othmar =

- Gender: Male
- Language: German

Other names
- Variant forms: Adamarus, Ademar, Adhemar, Audomar Otmar, Ottmar
- Derived: Audamar

Othmar, also spelled Otmar or Ottmar, is a masculine German given name, derived from the Germanic name Audamar, from the elements aud "wealth, prosperity" and mar "fame".

Notable people with the name include:

- Saint Othmar, medieval monk and priest
- Othmar Ammann (1879–1965), Swiss-American structural engineer
- Otmar Emminger (1911–1986), German economist
- Otmar Freiherr von Verschuer (1896-1969), German-Dutch human biologist and geneticist
- Otmar Hasler (born 1953), Prime Minister of Lichtenstein (2001–2009)
- Ottmar Hörl, German conceptual artist, sculptor, installation, action, photography, and object artist
- Ottmar Hitzfeld (born 1949), German football player and manager
- Otmar Issing (born 1936), German economist
- Othmar Karas (born 1957), Austrian politician
- Ottmar Liebert (born 1959), German guitarist, songwriter and producer
- Ottmar Luscinius (1487–1537), German humanist
- Ottmar Mergenthaler (1854–1899), German-American inventor
- Othmar Muller von Blumencorn, Swiss sailor
- Othmar Reiser (1861–1936), Austrian ornithologist
- Othmar Schoeck (1886–1957), Swiss composer
- Othmar Spann (1878–1950), Austrian philosopher
- Otmar Szafnauer (born 1964), American businessman
- Othmar Zeidler (1850–1911), Austrian chemist

== Fictional characters ==
- King Ottmar in the Legacy of Kain series
- Miss Othmar, the unseen teacher with a voice that is the sound of teaching from Charles M. Schulz's comic strip Peanuts

== See also ==
- Ottomar
- Omar (name)
- Otto
- Ademar
- Johann Karl Christoph Nachtigal, published Volcks-Sagen (1800) under the name Otmar
