= Freiburg Charterhouse =

Coordinates: 47°59′40″N 7°52′58″E

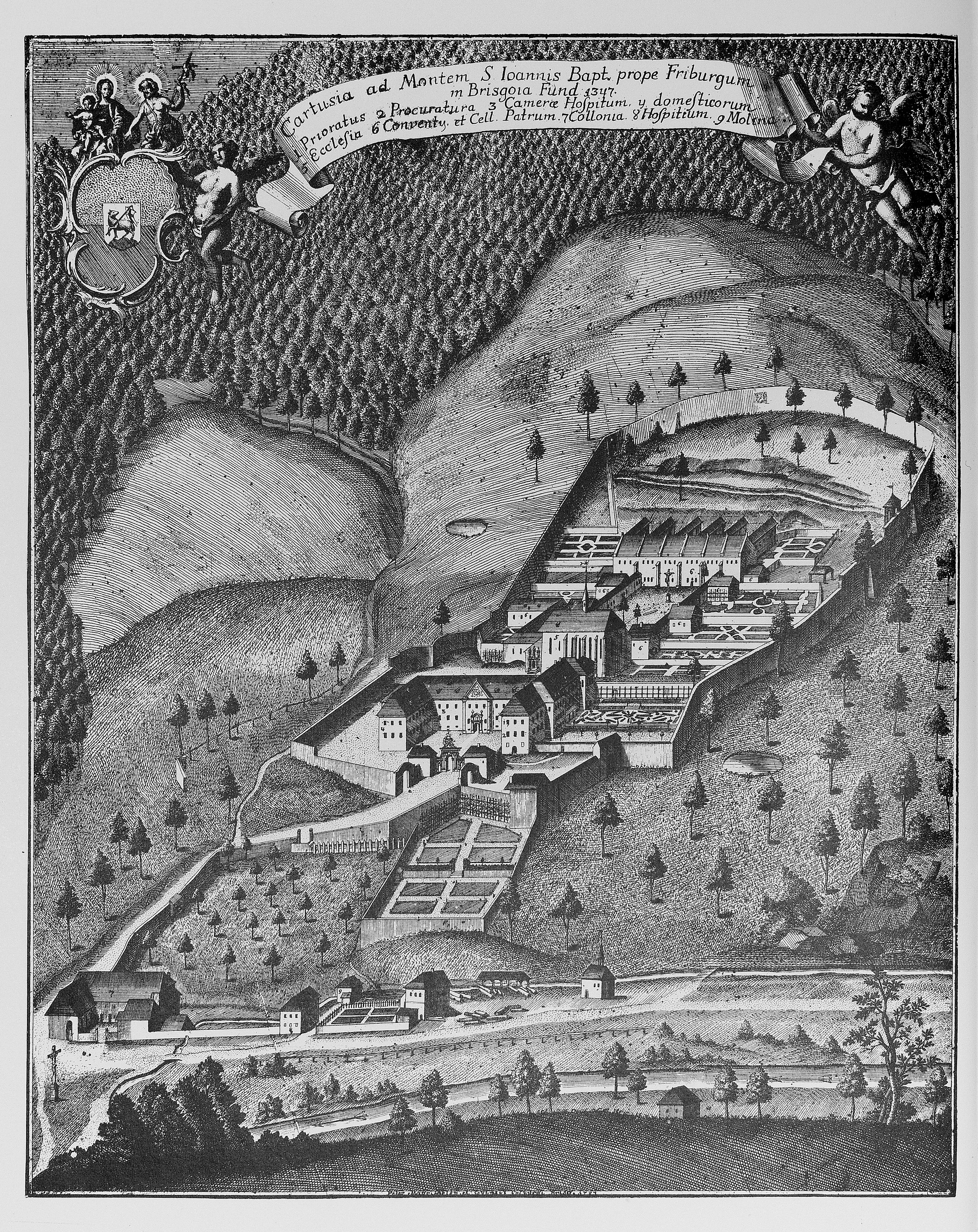
Freiburg Charterhouse (1771)

Freiburg Charterhouse (Kartause Freiburg) is a former Carthusian monastery, or charterhouse, in Freiburg im Breisgau, Baden-Württemberg, Germany.

== History ==
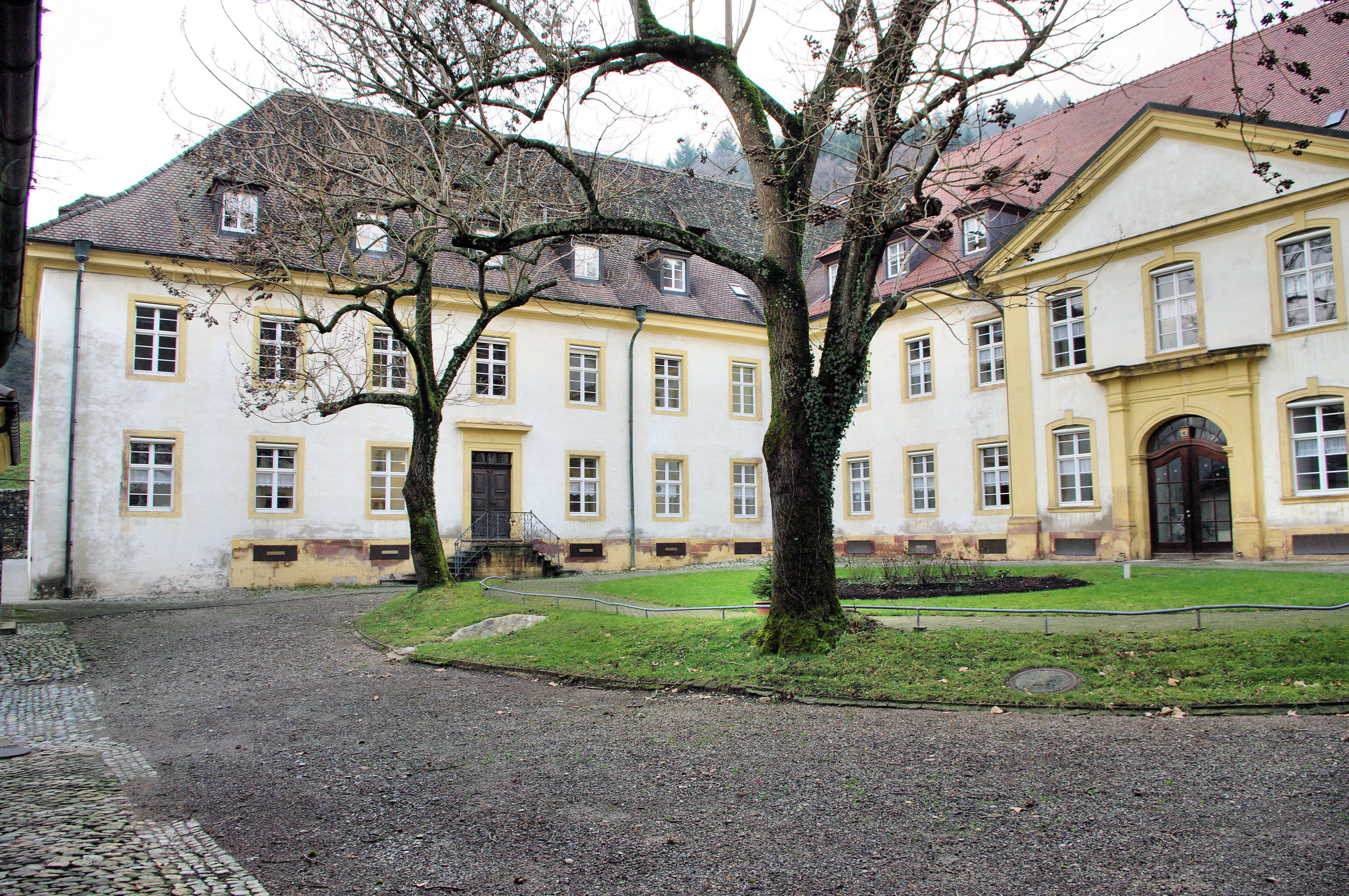
Freiburg Charterhouse, inner courtyard

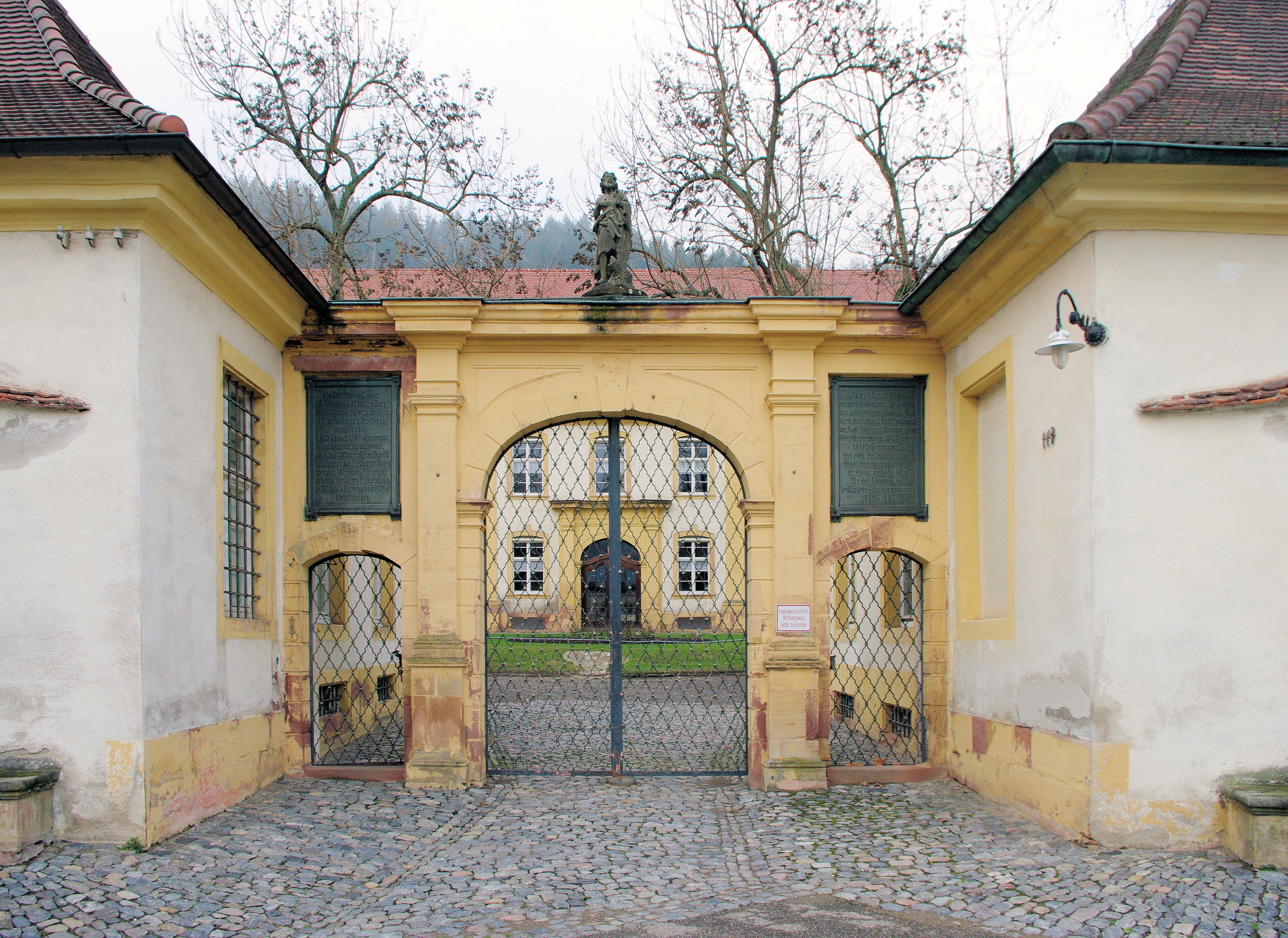
Charterhouse entrance

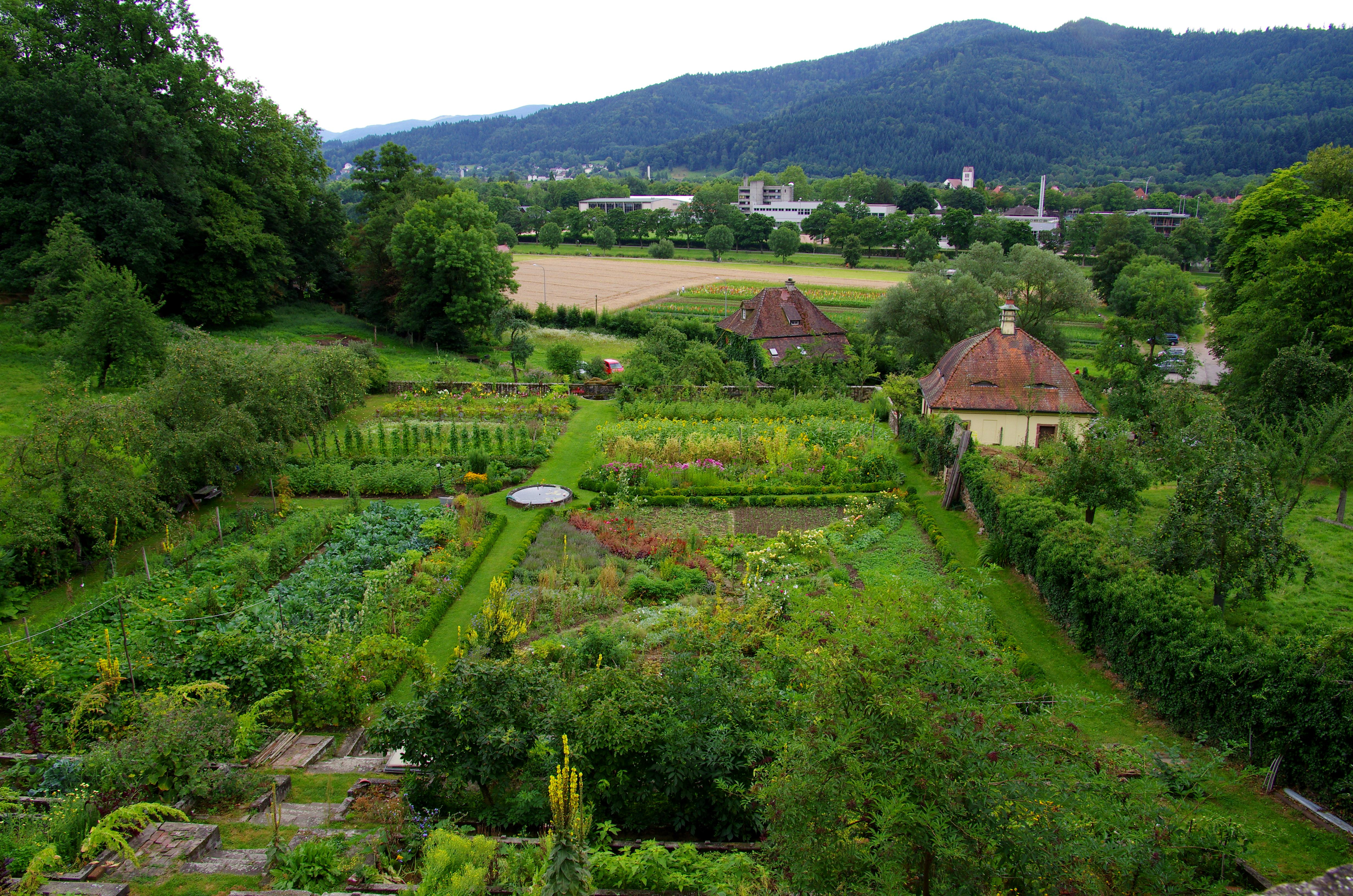
Charterhouse garden

Freiburg Charterhouse was founded in 1345 or 1346 by Johannes Schnewlin (Snewelin, Snewlin), knight, Bürgermeister of Freiburg. It was dedicated to Saint John the Baptist, in honour of the Grande Chartreuse near Grenoble, and was known as Sankt Johannisberg or St. Johannes des Täufers Berg ("St John's Mount" or the "Mount of St. John the Baptist"). It was to begin with a very modest establishment of only two monks' cells, increased on the death of the founder in 1347 to five. The original endowment consisted of a piece of land on the Mussbach below Sankt Ottilien; later endowments made it possible to increase the number of cells to twelve.

In the early 16th century, the premises were extended by the addition of the refectory and the church, which was constructed in the Late Gothic style with ribbed vaulting and flying buttresses. It featured magnificent stained glass windows to designs by the Swabian painter Hans Baldung Grien.

At its height the charterhouse maintained close contact with the University of Freiburg. From 1502 to 1525 the prior was Gregor Reisch, a significant representative of late Scholasticism and a professor at the university. The monastery supported impoverished students and in its turn received donations and novices from the circles round the university.

The monastery gradually built up a significant library, particularly through its contact with the university, mainly through the gifts of new entrants to the monastery, and also through legacies from university staff and local clergy. For example, in 1537 the monastery inherited the library (consisting of c. 390 books) and the estate of Otmar Nachtgall.

The Thirty Years' War and the ravages of the Swedish army caused a huge disruption. Like many other Carthusians the monks of Freiburg took refuge in Ittingen Charterhouse in Switzerland. Between 1753 and 1756 the buildings were enlarged by the addition, in front of the medieval cell range, of a grand Baroque courtyard of three wings for the accommodation of prelates, plus a guest wing. The prior's attempt to attain the rank of prelate caused an internal revolt, which was put aside in 1781, after the monastery had suffered a serious fire the previous year.

Emperor Joseph II commanded the dissolution of all Carthusian monasteries, including Freiburg, within five months of the decree dated 13 February 1782. Its buildings and lands became the property of the state and were sold to the Baron von Baden in 1783. The library was dispersed; only a few incunabula can now be traced, in the library of Freiburg University.

After the dissolution the buildings were converted for a country house of the nobility, with the prior's lodging as the main residence. The cloisters with the monks' cells were demolished to make way for a park, but the church was kept. The precious stained glass windows were sold off to various villages.

The charitable foundation of Freiburg acquired the property in 1894 and between 1895 and 1897 converted it into a nursing home, with places for 200 almspeople, as an extension to the Hospital of the Holy Ghost (Heilig-Geist-Spital). In 1897 Heinrich Hansjakob, the priest of Sankt Martin, was granted three rooms, by the intervention of the Bürgermeister and chairman of the charity committee, Otto Winterer. These rooms have been kept until today as a memorial.

In 1969, the nursing home moved to the newly built St. John's Home next door.

Since 2014, the building and facilities have been the home of the Robert Bosch United World College, a college of the UWC movement founded in the 1960s by Kurt Hahn.

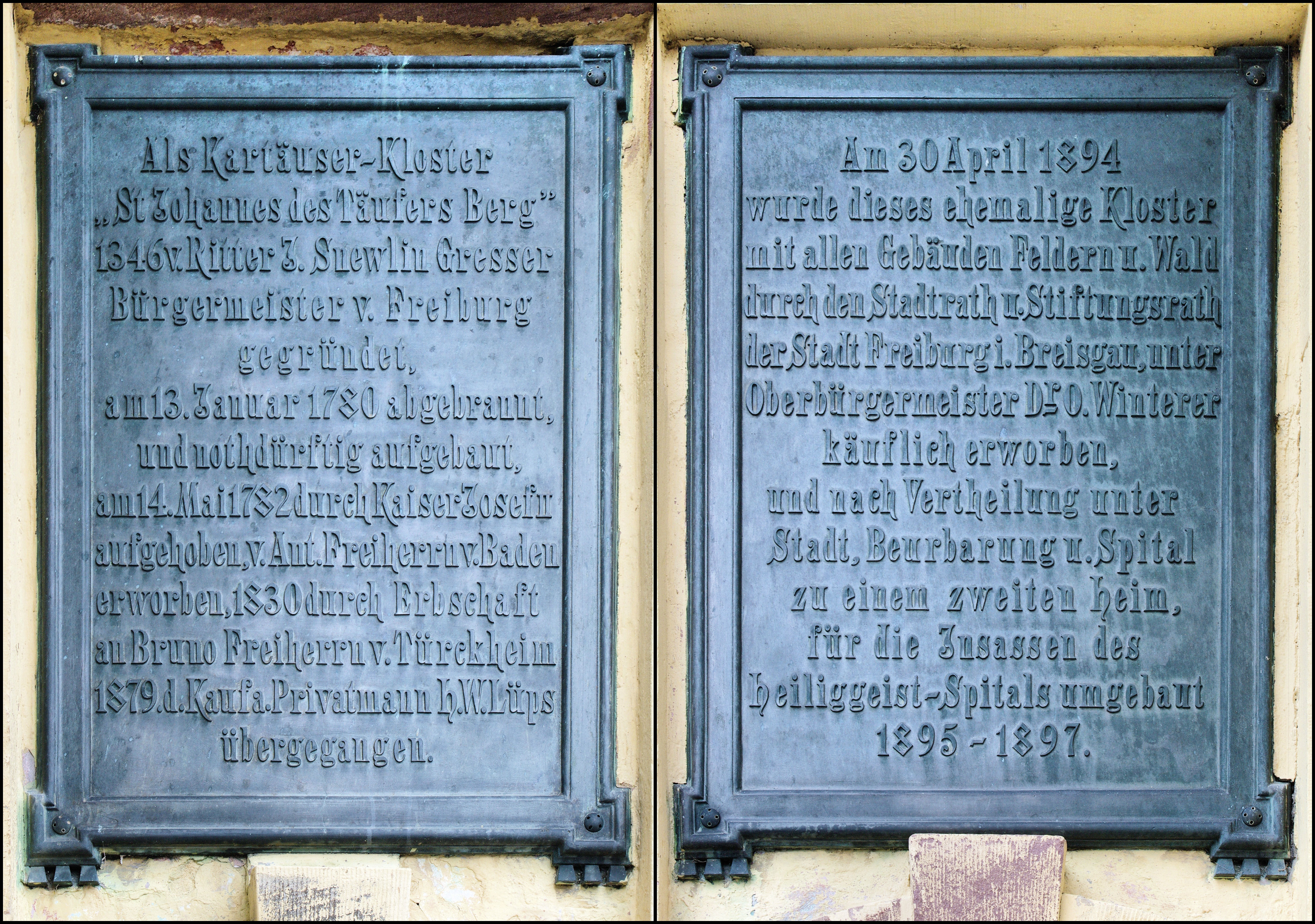
The two tablets to either side of the main entrance, giving the history of the building, set up after its conversion to a nursing home in 1897

== Sources ==
- Kalchtaler, Peter: Kartause mit bewegter Geschichte, Kloster, Gutshof und Altenheim. In: Badische Zeitung 17 June 2005 (in German)
- Mertens, Dieter: Zum Buchbesitz der Kartause Mons Sancti Johannis bei Freiburg im Breisgau. In: Bücher, Bibliotheken und Schriften der Kartäuser. Tübingen 2001 (in German)
