= 1487 in literature =

| List of years in literature | (table) |
- … 1477; 1478; 1479; 1480; 1481; 1482; 1483; 1484; 1485; 1486; 1487; 1488; 1489; 1490; 1491; 1492; 1493; 1494; 1495; 1496; 1497 …
- Art; Archaeology; Architecture; Literature; Music; Philosophy; Science; +...

This is a list of literature-related events in 1487.

== Events ==
- Erasmus writes to Servatius Rogerus from the monastery of Steyn.

== Works ==
- Niccolò da Correggio - Fabula di Cefalo.
- Heinrich Kramer & Jacob Sprenger - Malleus Maleficarum.

== Births ==
- date unknown
  - Petar Hektorović, Croatian poet (died 1572)
  - Ottmar Luscinius, biblical commentation (died 1537)
  - Macropedius, humanist writer and dramatist (died 1558)

== Deaths ==
- October 22 - Antonio Bettini, theologian (born 1396)
- date unknown - Jaume Safont, Catalan poet (born (1420)
