= Bultheel =

Bultheel is a Huguenot surname, meaning a sieve for sifting flour. It is the surname of:

- Adhemar Bultheel (born 1948), Belgian mathematician and computer scientist
- Jan Bultheel, Belgian animated film director
- Michaël Bultheel (born 1986), Belgian hurdle runner
