= Regal (instrument) =

Small portable organ

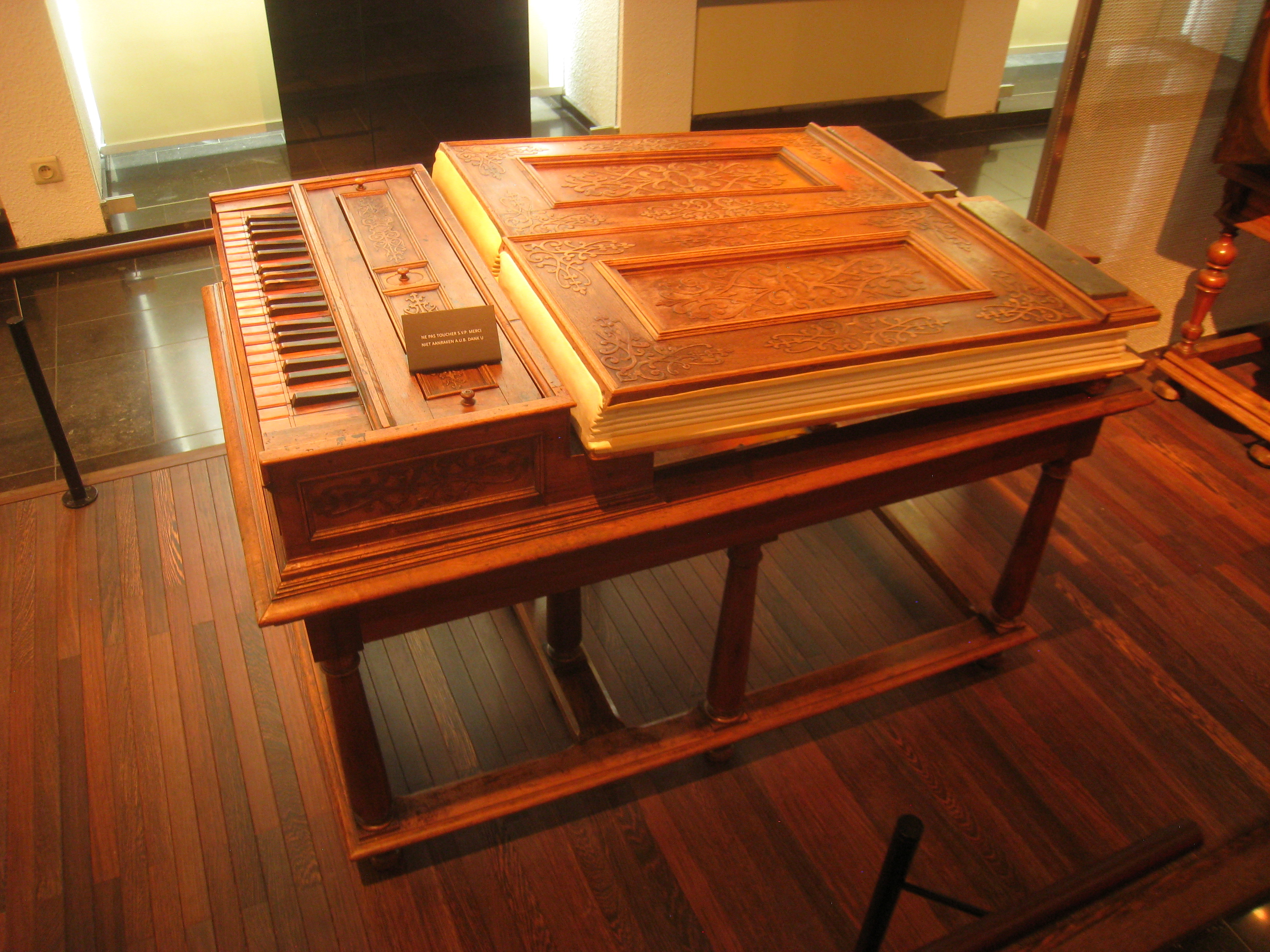
Regal, c. 1600, from Frauenfeld Abbey, Switzerland

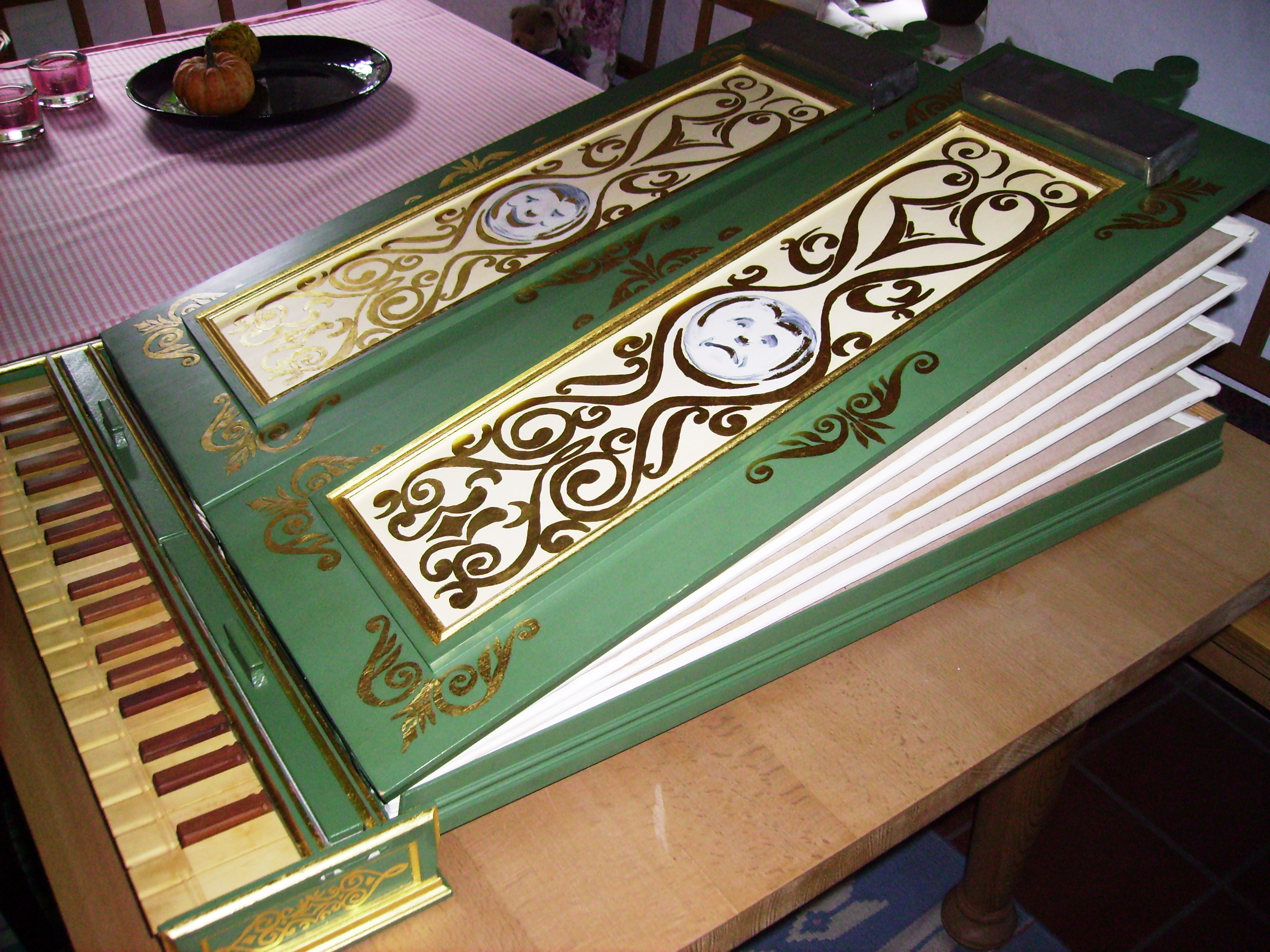
Regal made in 1988 after an instrument made c. 1600 in the Germanisches Nationalmuseum, Nuremberg

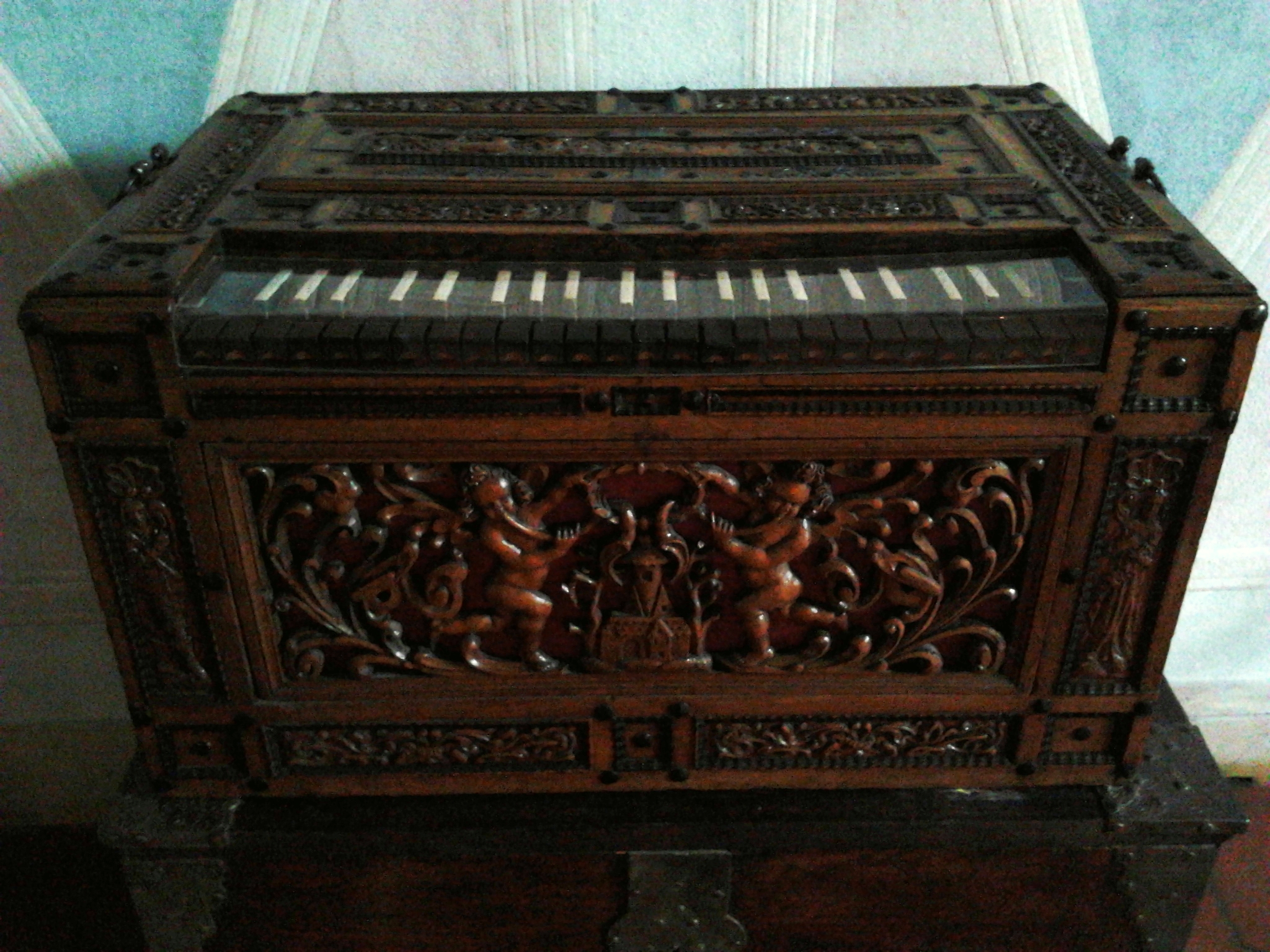
Early Baroque Casket regal (Polish: pozytyw szkatulny), c. 1640, a specific type of regal from the territories of the Polish–Lithuanian Commonwealth, Royal Castle in Warsaw

The musical instrument known as the regal or regalle (from Middle French régale) is a small portable organ, furnished with beating reeds and having two bellows. The instrument enjoyed its greatest popularity during the Renaissance. The name "regal" was also sometimes given to the reed stops of a pipe organ, and more especially to the vox humana stop.

== History ==
The sound of the regal is produced by brass reeds held in resonators. The length of the vibrating portion of the reed determines its pitch and is regulated by means of a wire passing through the socket, the other end pressing on the reed at the proper distance. The resonators in the regal are not intended to reinforce the vibrations of the beating reed or of its overtones (as in the reed pipes of the organ), but merely to form an attachment to keep the reed in place without interfering with its function. A common compass was C/E--c′′′ (four octaves, with a short octave in the bass), though this was by no means standardized. Most regals were placed on a table to be played, and required two people—one to play the instrument, and another to pump the bellows.

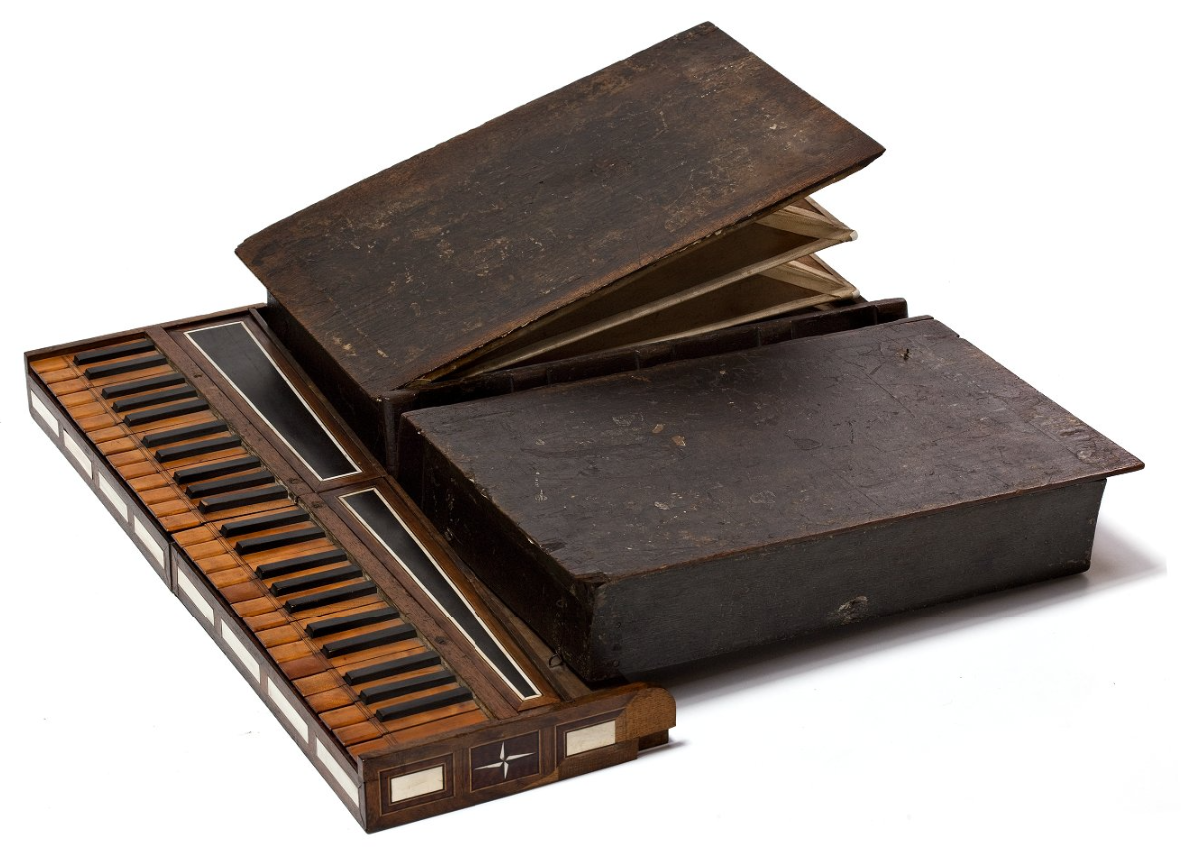
Bible Regal c. 1800, from St. Cecilias Hall Museum, Edinburgh

Michael Praetorius (1618) mentions a larger regal used in the court orchestras of some of the German princes, more like a positive organ, containing reeds at 4′, 8′, and even sometimes 16′ pitch, and having two bellows behind the case. These regals were used not only at banquets but often in place of positive organs in churches. A very small regal, sometimes called a Bible regal because it could be separated into sections and folded up like a book, was also mentioned by the same writer, who stated that these little instruments had an unpleasantly harsh tone due to their tiny resonators, which were not quite an inch long. He states that they were first made in Nuremberg and Augsburg.

In England and France, the word "regal" was sometimes applied to reed stops on the organ; Mersenne (1636) states that the word was applied at that time to the vox humana stop. According to Praetorius, the reed stops of pipe organs required constant tuning; he emphasized the fact that the pitch of the stop fell in summer and rose in winter. The pitch of the other stops rose in summer and fell in winter.

Because of civil wars and the ravages of time, very few antique regals survive. They were often mentioned in wills and inventories, such as the list of Henry VIII's musical instruments made after his death by Sir Philip Wilder (British Library Harley MS 1415, fol. 200 seq.), in which no fewer than thirteen pairs of single and five pairs of double regals are mentioned (although at that period, "pair" referred to a single instrument). Claudio Monteverdi scored for the regals in his operas, and the instrument was described and illustrated by Sebastian Virdung in 1511, Martin Agricola in 1528, and Othmar Luscinius in 1536. In England, as late as the reign of George III, there was the appointment of tuner of the regals to the Chapel Royal.

Drawings of the reeds of regals and other reed pipes, as well as of the instrument itself, are given by Praetorius (pl. iv., xxxviii.).

The regal may be seen as the ancestor of the harmonium, the reed organ, and the various varieties of "squeezebox" such as the accordion, the concertina, and the Bandoneón.

== Media ==
Sound of a regal
"Al Milanese", from the Castell-Arquato Manuscript, and an unknown piece, Performed by Ulrich Metzner

Sound of a regal stop
Excerpt from "Variations on Est-ce Mars" by Jan Pieterszoon Sweelinck, performed by Ashtar Moïra
