= Adhem =

Adhem may refer to:

- Abou Ben Adhem Shrine Mosque
- Ibrahim Bin Adham, also known as Abu Ben Adhem, an Arab Muslim saint

== See also ==
- Adhemar
