= Ademar Braga (footballer) =

Brazilian footballer (born 1976)

Personal information
- Full name: Ademar da Silva Braga Júnior
- Date of birth: 12 August 1976 (age 50)
- Place of birth: Rio de Janeiro, Brazil
- Height: 1.87 m (6 ft 2 in)
- Position: Defender

Senior career*
Years	Team	Apps	(Gls)
1995	Cerezo Osaka	0	(0)
1997–2001	Flamengo	0	(0)
2001	Americano	0	(0)
2002	CFZ (RJ)	0	(0)
2002–2003	Békéscsabai Előre	?	(?)
2005	Internacional (SP)	0	(0)
2005–2006	Petróleos Luanda	?	(?)
2006	Estácio de Sá	0	(0)
2007	Cachoeiras	0	(0)
2007–2008	Castelo Branco	0	(0)
- * Club domestic league appearances and goals

Ademar da Silva Braga Júnior (born 12 August 1976) is a former Brazilian footballer.

== Biography ==
Braga started his career at hometown club Flamengo, one of the most successful Brazilian teams. He played his only match (exclude State competition) at 1997 Copa do Brasil. He then played for Americano. In 2002, he was signed by Centro de Futebol Zico Sociedade Esportiva, the club found by Brazilian legend Zico, re-joined former teammate Felipe Veras. Both players left the club in late 2002, which Braga joined Hungarian top division team Békéscsabai Előre. He then returned to Brazil. In June 2005, he left for Petróleos Luanda of Portuguese speaking country Angola, from less famous team Internacional of Limeira, São Paulo state.

In March 2006, he returned to Rio de Janeiro for Estácio de Sá. He then signed a contract in August with Cachoeiras of Cachoeiras de Macacu, Rio de Janeiro state.

After he played for Castelo Branco of Rio de Janeiro city at 2008 season, he retired.
