= 1485 in literature =

List of years in literature	(table)
- … 1475; 1476; 1477; 1478; 1479; 1480; 1481; 1482; 1483; 1484; 1485; 1486; 1487; 1488; 1489; 1490; 1491; 1492; 1493; 1494; 1495 …
- Art; Archaeology; Architecture; Literature; Music; Philosophy; Science; +...

== Events ==
- William Grocyn becomes prebendary of Lincoln Cathedral.

== Works ==
- Leon Battista Alberti - De Re Aedificatoria (first printed book on architecture)
- Joseph Albo - Sefer ha-Ikkarim (posthumously published)
- Sir Thomas Malory - Le Morte d'Arthur

== Births ==
- October 1 - Johannes Dantiscus, Polish poet and bishop (died 1548)
- probable - Hanibal Lucić, Croatian poet and playwright (died 1553)

== Deaths ==
- October 27 - Rodolphus Agricola, humanist writer (born 1443)
- date unknown - Diebold Schilling the Elder, chronicler
