= Ademir =

Ademir (a form of the Portuguese-language given name Ademar) is a Brazilian common given name.

It may refer to these Brazilian footballers:

- Ademir Marques de Menezes (1922–1996), who participated at 1950 FIFA World Cup;
- Ademir da Silva Santos Júnior (born 1995), forward
- Ademir da Guia (born 1942), who participated at 1974 FIFA World Cup
- Ademir Chiarotti (1948–2013), midfielder of XV de Piracicaba and São Paulo FC
- Ademir Ribeiro Souza (born 1985), defender who has played in Brazil and Albania
- Ademir Roque Kaefer (born 1960), silver medal winner at the 1984 Summer Olympics.
- Adhemir de Barros, Paraná (born 1942), who participated at 1966 FIFA World Cup
- Ademir Vieira (born 1951), midfielder

It is also a Bosnian name which may refer to:

- Ademir Kenović (born 1950), Bosnian film director and producer
