= Ottomar =

Ottomar is a masculine given name of Germanic origin. It is derived from Audamar, a name comprised from the elements *aud, meaning wealth, and *mari, meaning fame. Another variant of the name is Othmar.

The name may refer to:

- Ottomar Anschütz (1846–1907), German inventor, photographer, and chronophotographer
- Ottomar Gern (1827–1882), Russian fortification engineer
- Ottomar Rodolphe Vlad Dracula Prince Kretzulesco (1940–2007), German socialite
- Ottomar Ladva (born 1997), Estonian chess player
- Ottomar von Mayenburg (1865–1932), German pharmacist
- Ottomar Pinto (1931–2007), Brazilian politician
- Ottomar Rosenbach (1851–1907), German physician
- Hermann Ottomar Herzog (1832–1932), German-American painter
- Julius Rudolph Ottomar Freiherr von Minutoli (1804–1860), Prussian chief of police, diplomat, scientist, and author

== See also ==
- Othmar
- Omar (name)
- Otto
