= Ademar (footballer, born 1983) =

Brazilian footballer

Personal information
- Full name: Ademar dos Santos Batista
- Date of birth: 21 March 1983 (age 43)
- Place of birth: Rio de Janeiro, Brazil
- Height: 1.76 m (5 ft 9 in)
- Position: Striker

Team information
- Current team: Botafogo

Youth career
- 2002–2003: Botafogo

Senior career*
| Years | Team | Apps | (Gls) |
| 2004–2007 | Botafogo | 1 | (0) |
| 2006 | → Americano-RJ (loan) | | |
| 2007 | → Estácio (loan) | | |
- BC Augsburg
- * Club domestic league appearances and goals

Ademar dos Santos Batista (born 21 March 1983), known simply as Ademar, is a Brazilian professional footballer who plays as a striker.

== Career ==
Ademar formerly played for BC Augsburg and Botafogo. He was loaned to Estácio in 2007.
