= Aymer =

Aymer (a variant of Ademar) is a given name and a surname. Notable people with the name include:

- Aymer, Count of Angoulême (c. 1160–1202), count of Angoulême in France
- Aymer II of Angoulême (died 952), count of Angoulême in France
- Aymer de Valence (bishop) (c. 1222–1260), English bishop
- Aymer Edward Maxwell (1877–1914), son of British horticuralist and genealogist Sir Herbert Maxwell, 7th Baronet
- Aymer de Valence, 2nd Earl of Pembroke (c. 1270–1324), Anglo-French nobleman
- Henriette Aymer de La Chevalerie (1767–1834), French religious sister
