= Robert Bosch United World College =

UWC Robert Bosch College
- Logo
- Other names: RBC, Robert Bosch College
- Motto: UWC makes education a force to unite people, nations and cultures for peace and a sustainable future
- Founding Rector: Laurence Nodder (2014-2024)
- Type: Private secondary boarding school
- Established: September 23, 2014; 6 years ago
- Affiliations: United World Colleges
- Chair: Lukas Bosch
- Rector: Helen White(2024-Present)
- Total staff: 61(fall 2025)
- Students: 200(spring 2026)
- Location: Kartäuserstraße 119, Freiburg, Baden-Württemberg, Germany; 47°59′27″N 7°50′49″E World School
- Student to faculty ratio: 3:1
- Colors: Blue and Teal
- # of alumni: 1000+
- Campus size: 10 hectare grounds
- Website: https://www.uwcrobertboschcollege.de/

UWC Robert Bosch College (RBC) is a private secondary boarding school in Freiburg, Baden-Württemberg, Germany. It is the sixth-newest member of the United World Colleges (UWC) movement, one of eighteen colleges around the world, having started accepting students in September 2014. The mission of the UWC movement and of the school is to "make education a force to unite people, nations and cultures for peace and a sustainable future". The college follows the International Baccalaureate (IB) curriculum, covering the two final years of high school.

== Student body ==
The student body of around 200 students is selected by over 140 national committees worldwide, who review the applications and invite students for interviews and/or selection weekends. Each year group, divided between first years and second years, consists of about 100 students. Approximately 25% of the student body are from Germany and the other 75% are from other countries. The international student body consists of around 90 nationalities, with a diversity of religious and socio-economic backgrounds. Thanks to a wide network of sponsors and supporters and a need-based scholarship program, the national committees can select students irrespective of the financial situation of their parents. At UWC Robert Bosch College, 65% of the students receive a full scholarship, 30% are on partial scholarship, and the remaining students are self-funded.

== Campus facilities ==
The college is located a mere 10 minute drive away from Freiburg's Altstadt, where the famous Freiburg Minster is located. The RBC is situated on a hill surrounded by the Black Forest and overlooking the river that runs through Freiburg, the Dreisam .

The college's fully residential campus is located on the refurbished Freiburg Charterhouse, a former Carthusian monastery dating to the 14th century. The students are housed in modernist and minimalistic cube-shaped student houses, which were designed by architect Peter Kulka and follow the city of Freiburg's energy-efficient standards. The houses are sustainable and are powered by energy from solar panels. The student village consists of eight student houses and four houses for teachers. The student houses accommodates around 24 students. Teachers also serve as "house parents", providing support both in the learning and residential context. All houses are equipped with kitchens with common cooking and cleaning supplies, living room(common rooms) with tables and sofas, washing and drying machines, 4 bathrooms, and a storage room.

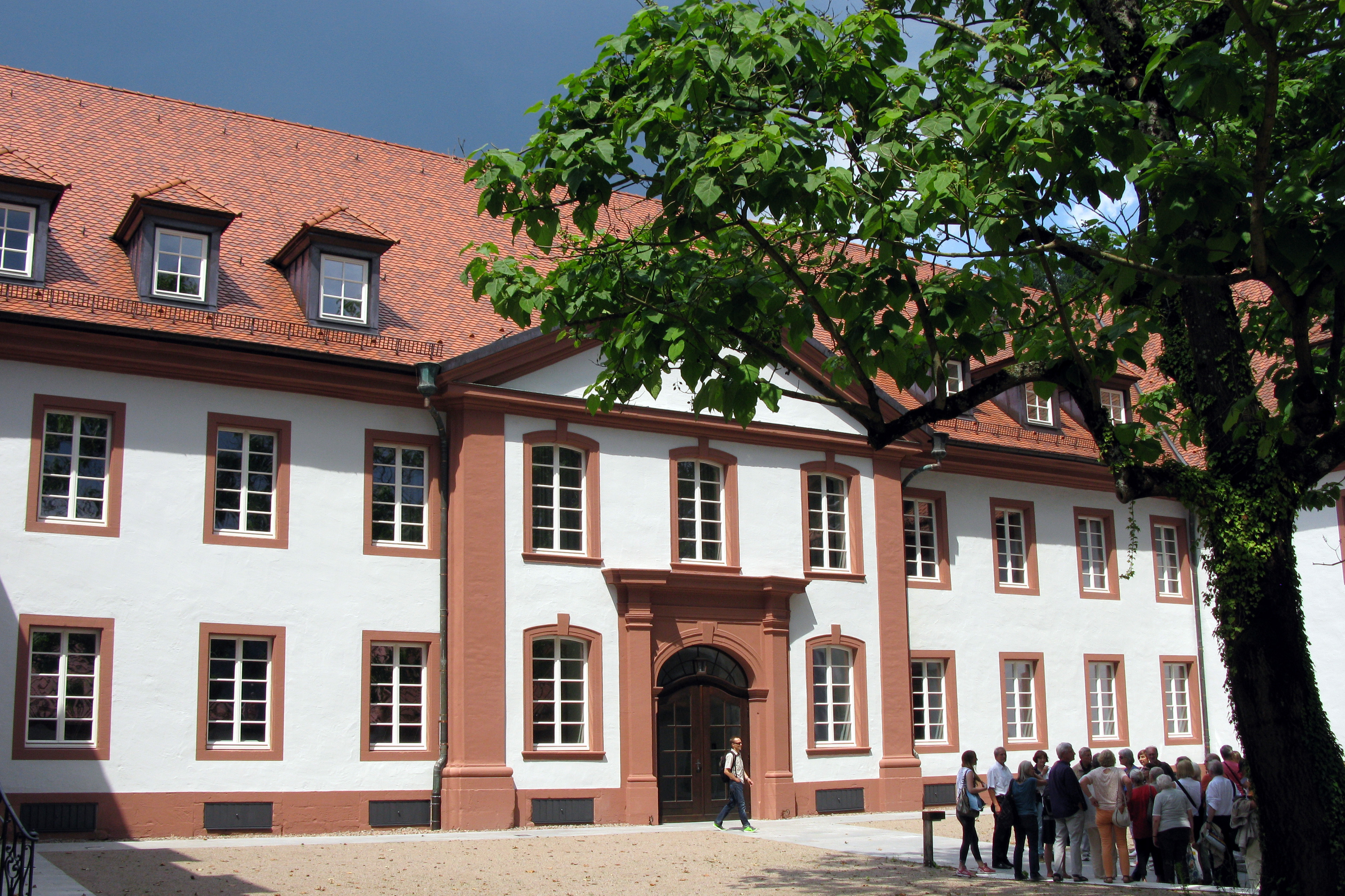
The Freiburg Charterhouse, a former Carthusian monastery. It makes up the main educational and administrative building.

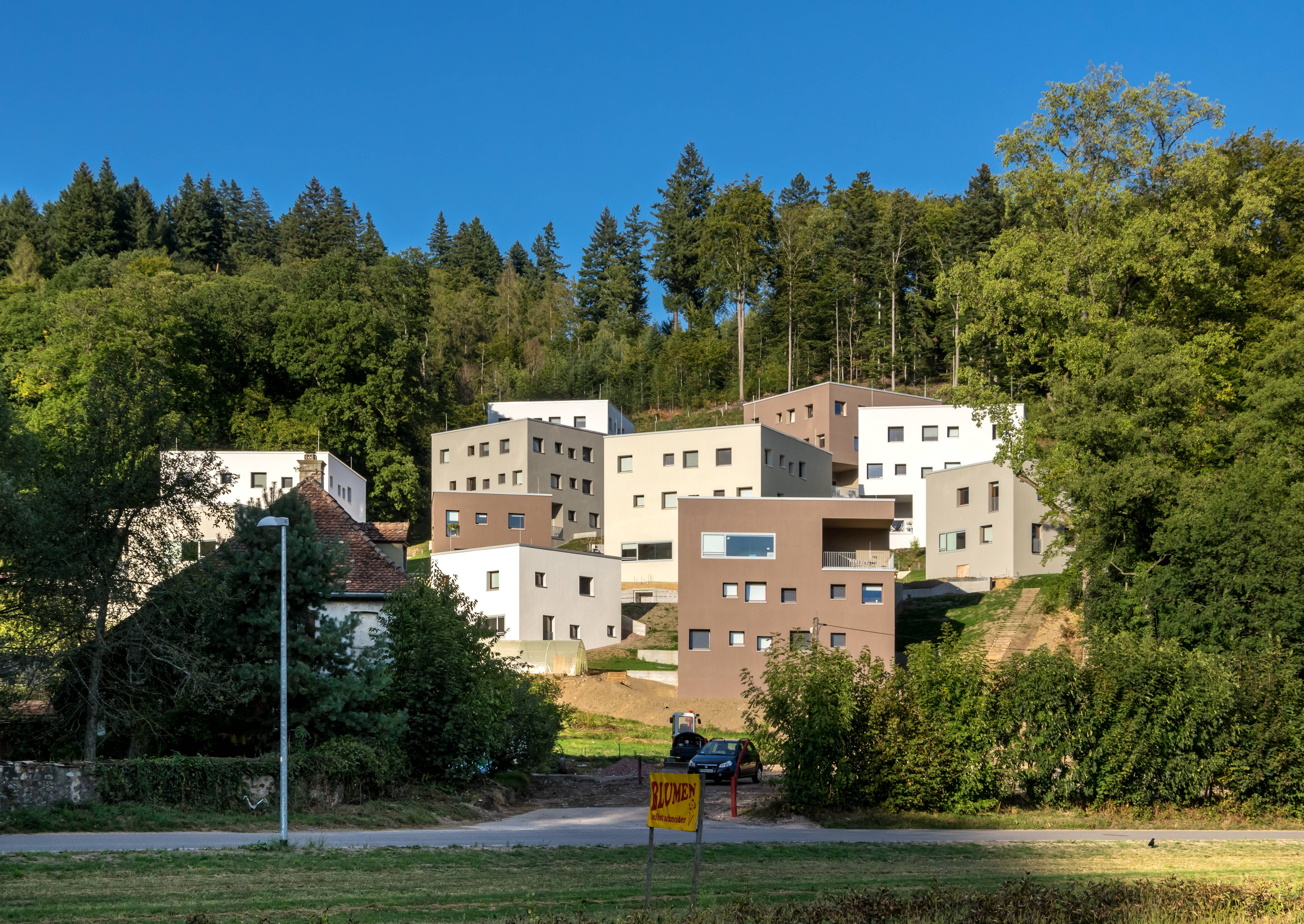
Modern on-campus student residences.

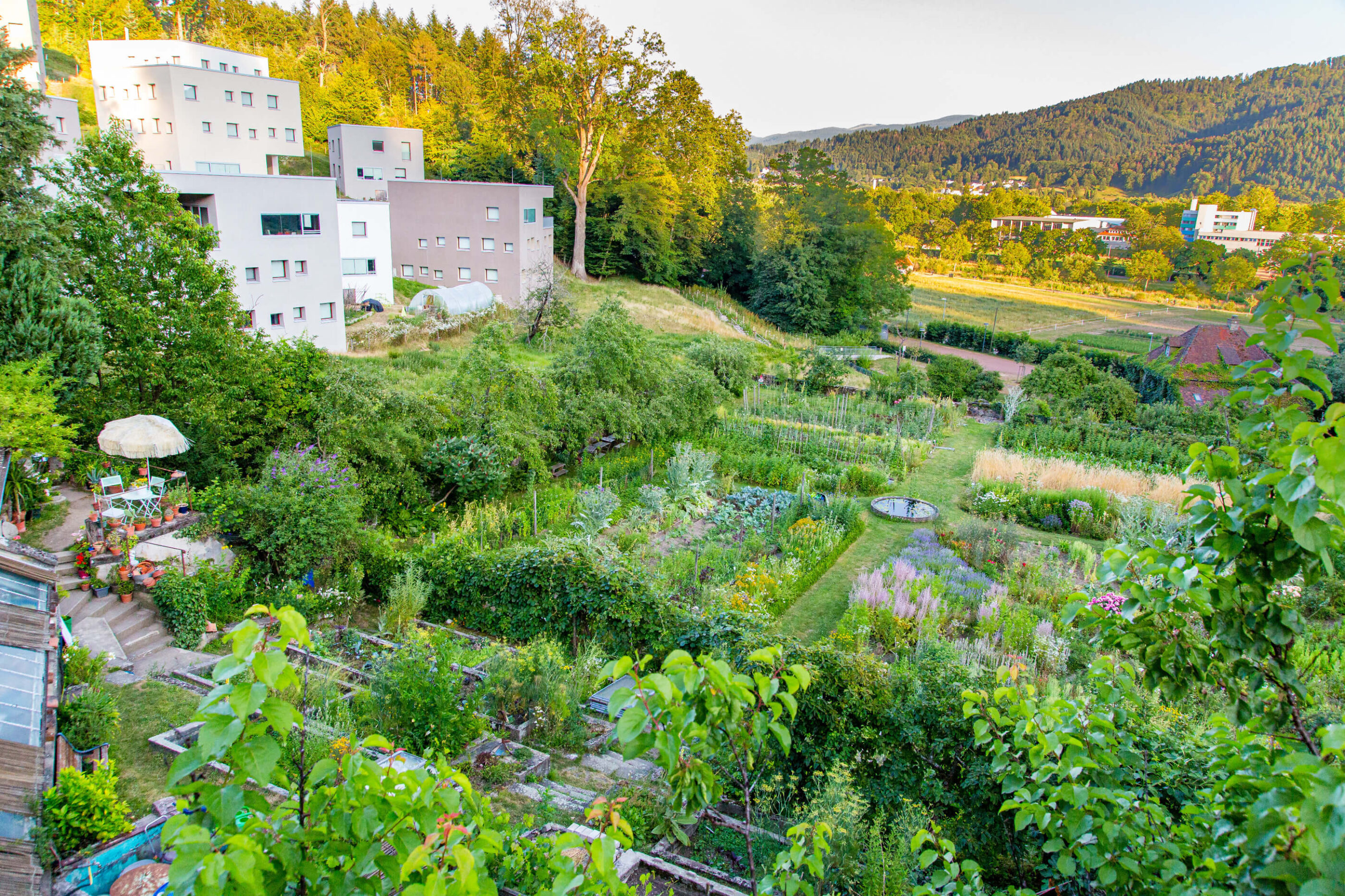
A portion of the RBC garden

A two-floors library is located inside the Charterhouse for staff and students. The RBC Weickart Library, in addition to possessing over 4200 novels and 300 films on DVD, offers students free subscriptions to 5 magazine subscriptions including online International New York Times, the Financial times, and a licensed JSTOR database.

The college is also responsible for the 0.2 hectare former monastery garden. The garden offers students the opportunity to learn the basics of gardening and is an important part of the school's sustainability concept. In addition to around 400 crops and 130 trees, the garden also possesses a clay oven built by the students for baking bread and pizza, a lily-pad fountain in the center, and a corner for bees, runner ducks, chickens, alpacas and rabbits. It also serves as a free roam area for the population of sheep surrounding the campus. It is open to the public every Friday afternoon between 3 p.m. and 6 p.m.

== Educational tenets and approaches ==
The United World Colleges teach the International Baccalaureate (IB) Diploma Program, which is widely considered to be a challenging and broad education program. The diploma can be obtained in English, Spanish and French; at UWC Robert Bosch College the language of instruction is English.

The following IB subjects are offered at the college(fall 2025):

- Group 1: Language and Literature - Arabic A, English A, French A, German A, Spanish A, School-Supported Self-Taught Literature A (in a language the student already knows fluently)
- Group 2: Modern Language Acquisition - English B, French B, German AB initio, German B
- Group 3: Individuals and Societies - Global Politics, History, Economics, Environmental Systems and Societies(ESS), Social and Cultural Anthropology
- Group 4: Sciences - Physics, Chemistry, Biology, Environmental Systems and Societies(note that ESS can serve as a group 3 or a group 4 subject).
- Group 5: Mathematics - Analysis & Approaches, Applications & Interpretations
- Group 6: The Arts - Visual Arts, Theater

The school places a particular emphasis on environmental issues. As part of the school's educational program, "students grapple with how technology can contribute to sustainable development and peace".

The founder of the umbrella movement, Kurt Hahn, believed in a Holistic and balanced educational approach including learning through experience. Therefore, In addition to the IB program, the school compels students to participate in Creativity, Activity, and Service(CAS); it's a prerequisite that students must meet in order to obtain the IB diploma. There are usually 70 activities offered per term, most of which are initiated and led by the students. The college's community service program comprises 40 projects, over 20 of which take place in cooperation with outside institutions.

In addition, the campus offers so called "Project Weeks" in the attempt to bolster student's independence and decision making skills. Once a term, project weeks take students to destinations all over Europe. With the support of a teacher, students plan a specific project focusing on social service or experiential education. This includes independently organizing a volunteer partner organization, the group’s accommodation and travel. Students have a budget of 23 euros per person and per day at their disposal.

== Funding & name ==
The school is named after German industrialist Robert Bosch, founder of the Robert Bosch GmbH. The company and the Robert Bosch Stiftung foundation contributed around 45 million Euros to the project. Together with Deutsche Stiftung UWC, the Robert Bosch Stiftung is a big shareholder of the school. Additional significant support comes from Land Baden-Württemberg, B. Braun Melsungen AG, Stadt Freiburg, Adelhausenstiftung Freiburg, the Eugen-Martin-Stiftung as well as many other individual sponsors.
