= Ademar Caballero =

Brazilian swimmer 1918–1982

Personal information
- Full name: Ademar Alberto Novo Caballero
- Nationality: Brazil
- Born: 2 December 1918 Rio de Janeiro, Brazil
- Died: 25 March 1982 (aged 53) Rio de Janeiro, Brazil

Sport
- Sport: Swimming
- Strokes: Backstroke

Ademar Alberto Novo Caballero (2 December 1918 – 25 March 1982) was an Olympic backstroke swimmer from Brazil, who participated at one Summer Olympics for his native country. At the 1936 Summer Olympics in Berlin, he swam the 100-metre backstroke, not reaching the finals.
