= Adhemar =

Adhemar is a masculine given name. Notable people with the name include:

== Given name ==
=== Middle Ages ===
Ordered chronologically

- Adhemar of Salerno, Prince of Salerno from 853 to 861
- Adhemar of Capua, Duke of Spoleto from 998 and Prince of Capua from 1000
- Adhémar de Chabannes (988/989–1034), French monk, composer, scribe, historian, poet, grammarian and literary forger
- Adhemar of Le Puy (died 1098), representative of Pope Urban II in the First Crusade— leading and fighting alongside his men—and bishop of Puy-en-Velay
- Aymer, Count of Angoulême (c. 1160–1202), also spelled Adhemar and Ademar
- Adhémar Jori/Jory (1375), lord of Domeyrat près Carlat

=== Modern world ===
Ordered alphabetically

- Adhémar d'Alès (1861–1938), French theologian and Jesuit
- Adhémar Barré de Saint-Venant (1797–1886), French mechanician and mathematician
- Adhemar de Barros (1901–1969), Brazilian politician, mayor of São Paulo and Governor of São Paulo
- Adhemar Bultheel (born 1948), Belgian mathematician
- Adhémar de Chaunac (1896–1972), French-born Canadian vintner
- Adhemar (footballer, born 1896), Adhemar dos Santos, Brazilian football midfielder
- Adhemar (footballer, born 1972), Adhemar Ferreira de Camargo Neto, Brazilian football forward
- Adhemar Pimenta (1896–1970), Brazilian football manager
- Adhémar Raynault (1891–1984), Canadian politician and mayor of Montreal
- Adhemar da Silva (1927–2001), Brazilian triple jumper

== Fictional characters ==
- Adhemar (comic book character), Flemish comic book character in The Adventures of Nero by Marc Sleen
- Count Adhemar, the main antagonist of A Knight's Tale, a medieval comedy starring Heath Ledger

== See also ==
- Ademar
- Bronzen Adhemar
- Château des Adhémar
- La Garde-Adhémar
- Grignan-Les Adhemar AOC
- Rodovia Adhemar de Barros
