= Ademar Benítez =

Uruguayan footballer (born 1956)

Personal information
- Full name: Meliton Ademar Benítez Barbosa
- Date of birth: 21 May 1956 (age 70)
- Place of birth: Montevideo, Uruguay
- Height: 1.75 m (5 ft 9 in)
- Position: Centre forward

Senior career*
Years	Team	Apps	(Gls)
1975–1977	Barcelona		
1977–1979	Deportivo Quito		
1979–1981	León	50	(16)
1981–1982	Pumas	18	(1)
1984	LDU de Quito	30	(9)
1985	Marítimo	5	(1)
1986–1988	Municipal		
1988–1989	Club Deportivo FAS		
- * Club domestic league appearances and goals

Meliton Ademar Benítez Barbosa, known as Ademar Benítez, (born 21 May 1956) is a Uruguayan former football striker.

== Career ==
Born in Montevideo, Ademar moved to Ecuador where he enjoyed success with Deportivo Quito during the 1975 and 1976 seasons. He joined rivals Barcelona S.C. for two seasons, but did not enjoy the same level of success.

Ademar moved to Mexico in 1979, playing in the Mexican Primera División with Club León and Pumas. He also had a brief spell in Portugal with C.S. Marítimo in 1985.

In 1986, he moved to Guatemala where he helped C.S.D. Municipal with its first league title in 11 years in 1987. In 1988 he moved to El Salvador where he played for Club Deportivo FAS.
