= Ademar Jordan =

Knight and troubadour from Saint-Antonin

Ademar Jordan (fl. 1198–1212) was a knight and troubadour from Saint-Antonin in the Rouergue. He was possibly a vassal of Raimon Jordan.

Ademar apparently participated in the war against the Albigensian Crusade, for he was captured by Simon de Montfort on 6 May 1212 and is not heard from again. On the occasion of his capture he composed a sirventes in imitation of Bertran de Born, Si tot m'ai estat lonjamenz. His only other extant song is Pons, viscoms, lezir e sojor, a cobla esparsa or cobla de circonstance.

Ademar may also have participated in one of the Crusades (possibly the Fourth or the Reconquista).

== Sources ==
- Brunel, Clovis (1926). "Les troubadours Ademar Jordan et Uc Brunenc," Romania, 52, p. 506.
- Jeanroy, Alfred (1934). La poésie lyrique des troubadours. Toulouse: Privat.
- Schulze-Busacker, Elisabeth (1987). "French Conceptions of Foreigners and Foreign Languages in the Twelfth and Thirteenth Centuries," Romance Philology, 41:1 (Aug.) pp. 24–47.
