= Felipe Veras =

Brazilian footballer (born 1975)

Personal information
- Full name: Felipe Veras Rodrigues Melo
- Date of birth: 4 August 1975 (age 51)
- Place of birth: Rio de Janeiro, Brazil
- Position: Centre back

Youth career
- Flamengo

Senior career*
Years	Team	Apps	(Gls)
1995–1997	Flamengo	1	(0)
?–2002	CFZ (RJ)	0	(0)
2003	Al-Nasr (Qatar)	0	(0)
2004	Boavista (RJ)	0	(0)
2004–2005	Sabah FA	0	(0)
2005	Vasco da Gama	0	(0)
2007	Pelotas	0	(0)
- * Club domestic league appearances and goals

Felipe Veras Rodrigues Melo (born 4 August 1975) is a former Brazilian footballer.

== Biography ==
Felipe Veras started his career at hometown and one of the most successful teams in Brazil, Flamengo. He played his only match at Campeonato Brasileiro Série A on 3 December 1995, against São Paulo FC. He also played for the Rio de Janeiro in the state competitions and once at Copa do Brasil.

In 2003, he left for Al-Nasr of Qatar. He then returned to Rio de Janeiro state for Boavista.

In March 2005, he returned to Rio de Janeiro again, for Vasco da Gama.

After released from his 1-year contract with Pelotas of Campeonato Gaúcho, he retired from footballer.
