= Ademar lo Negre =

13th-century troubadour from Languedoc

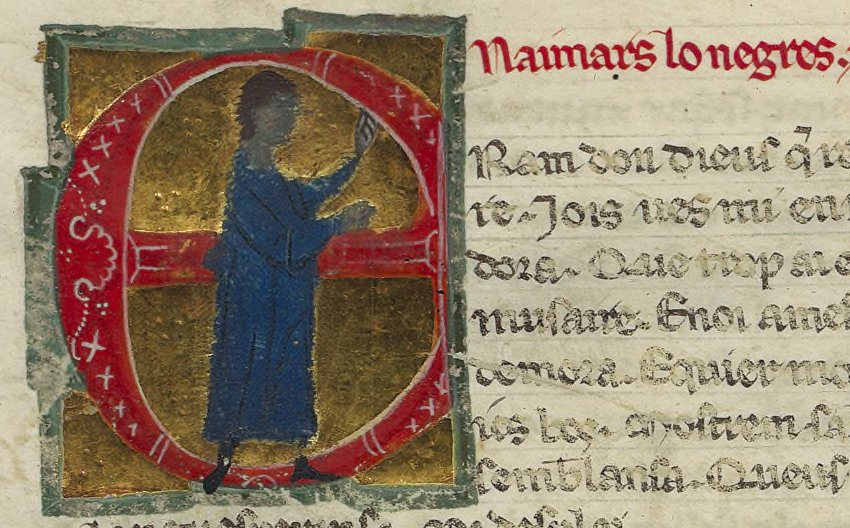
In his vida, he is called N'Aimars lo Negres (Lord Aimar the Black), which is the text in red next to his picture.

Ademar lo Negre ("Adhemar the Black") was a troubadour from Languedoc in the early thirteenth century (fl. 1210–1219). He was originally from Château-Vieux (Castelveill), which was under the jurisdiction of the Trencavel lords of Albi at the time. He was patronised by Peter II of Aragon and Raymond VI of Toulouse and even spent some time at the court of Ferdinand III of Castile. Four cansos of his survive.

== Sources ==
- Lang, H. R. "The Relations of the Earliest Portuguese Lyric School with the Troubadours and Trouvères." Modern Language Notes, 10:4 (Apr., 1895), pp. 104–116.
- The Vidas of the Troubadours. Margarita Egan, trans. New York: Garland, 1984. ISBN 0-8240-9437-9.
