= Ademar de Rocaficha =

Ademar de Rocaficha (circa 1200 ?) was a troubadour, probably from Roquefixade in the County of Foix. He wrote at least two cansos, "Ges per freg ni per calor" and "Si amors fos conoissens", and one sirventes, "No.m lau de midons ni d'amor". The latter is a polemic against love (amor) and against man's preference for riches (rics) over true worth (valor).
