= Imperial Futebol Clube =

Imperial
- Full name: Imperial Futebol Clube
- Founded: April 2, 2004
- Ground: Estádio Osório Júnior, Petrópolis, Rio de Janeiro
- Capacity: 5,000
Home colors	Away colors

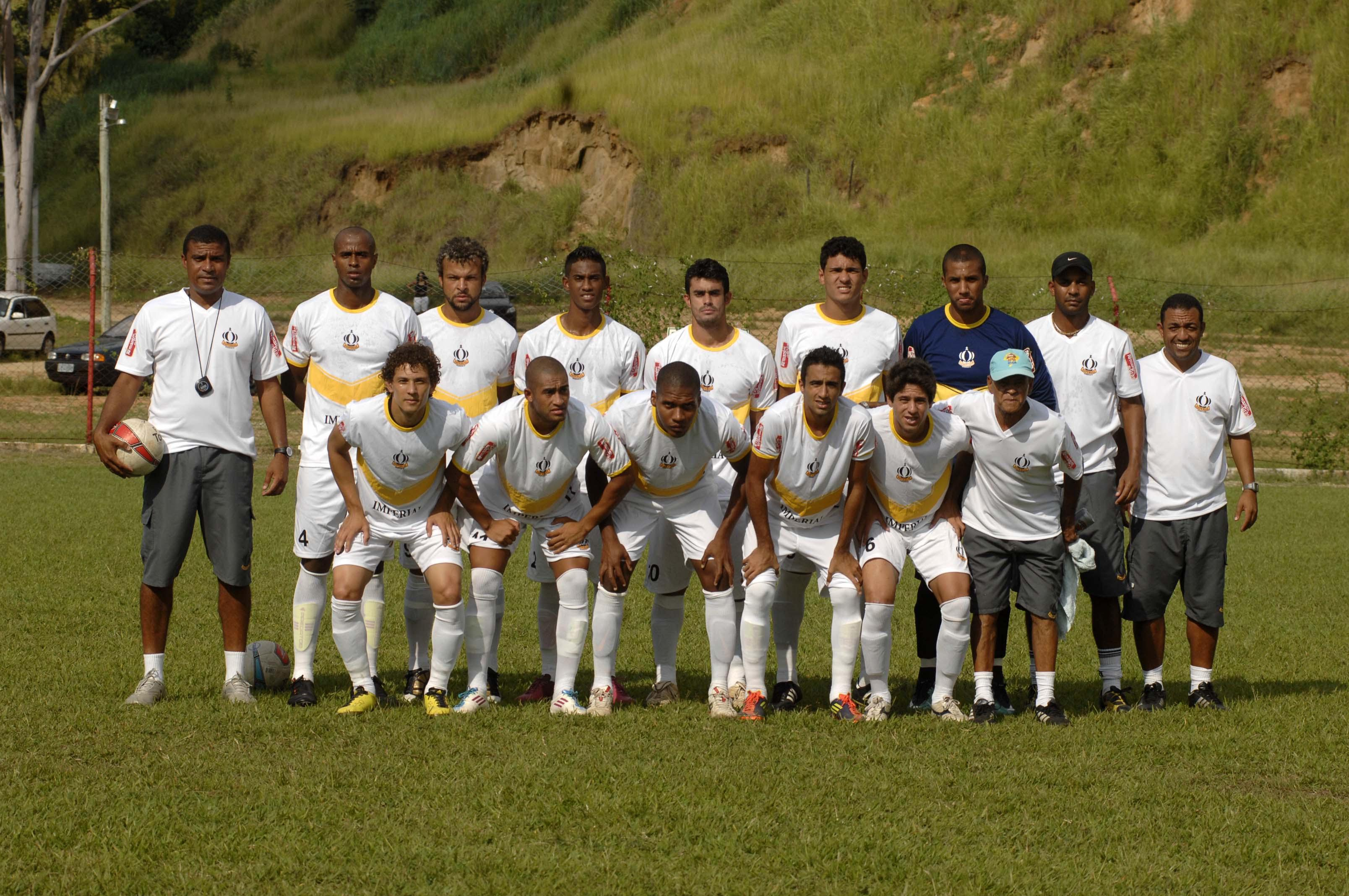
Team photo from the 2012 season

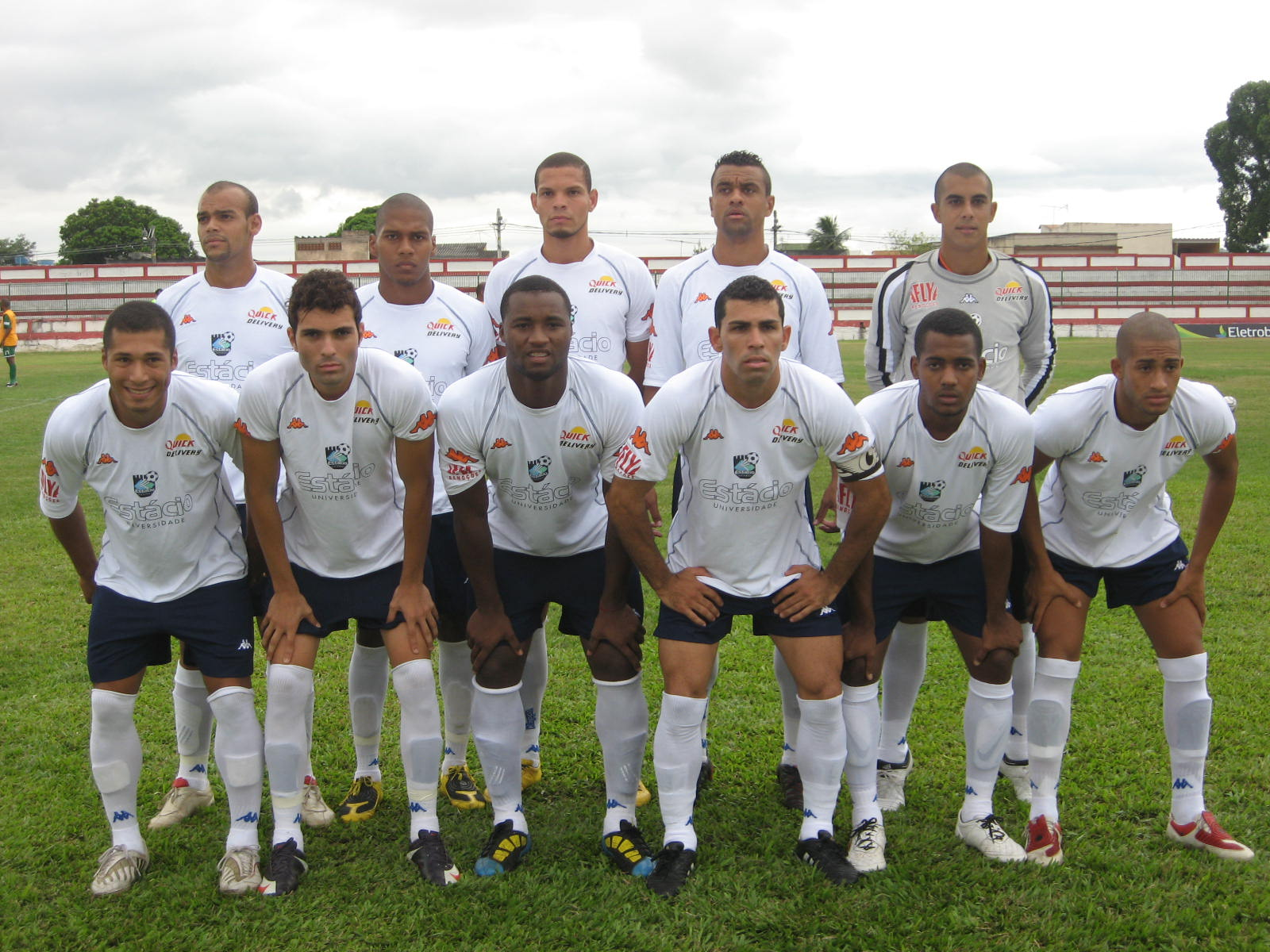
Team photo from the 2011 season

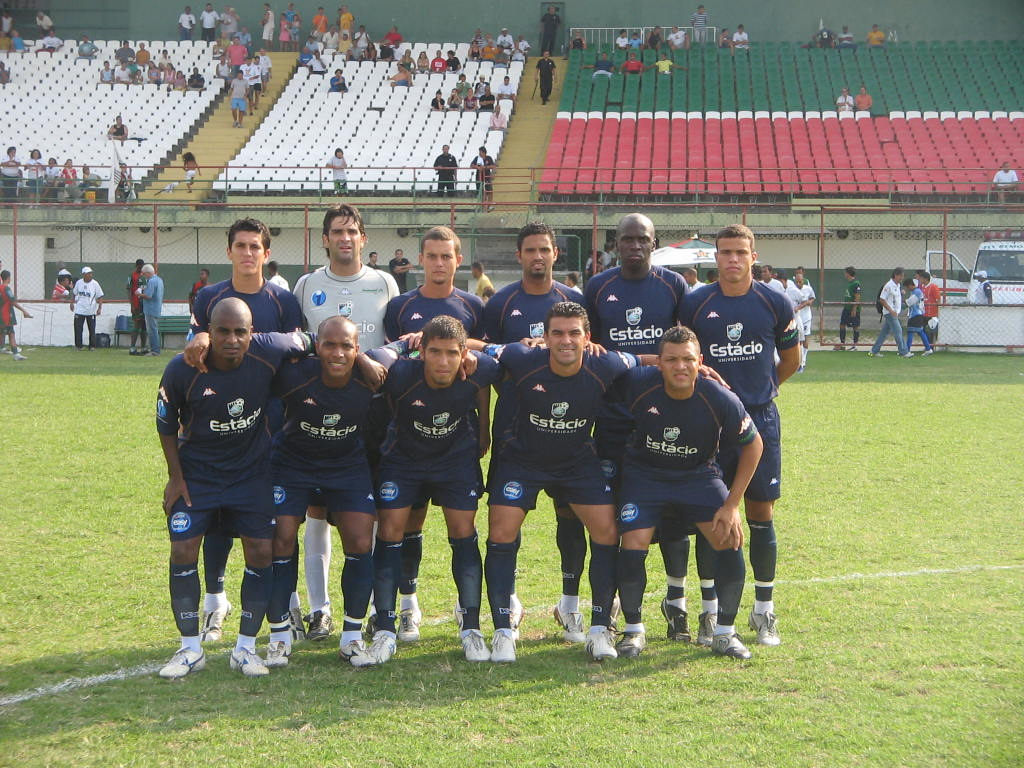
Team photo from the 2007 season

Imperial Futebol Clube, commonly known as Imperial, is a Brazilian football team from the city of Petrópolis, Rio de Janeiro state, founded on April 2, 2004. The club was formerly known as Universidade Estácio de Sá Futebol Clube and as Estácio de Sá Futebol Clube.

== History ==
On April 2, 2004, the club was founded by Estácio de Sá University (Universidade Estácio de Sá), as Universidade Estácio de Sá Futebol Clube, but was eventually renamed to Estácio de Sá Futebol Clube. Estácio de Sá was bought by the Movimento Esportivo de Petrópolis and renamed to Imperial Futebol Clube in late 2011.

== Honors ==
- Campeonato Carioca Terceira Divisão: 2005

== Stadium ==
Imperial Futebol Clube plays its home games at Estádio Osório Júnior, which has a maximum capacity of 5,000 people. As Estácio de Sá Futebol Clube, they played at Estádio Universidade Estácio de Sá Futebol Clube, which has a capacity of 6,000 people.

== Colors ==
The official colors are yellow, white and black.
