= Ademar Braga (football manager) =

Brazilian football manager (born 1945)

Personal information
- Full name: Ademar da Silva Braga
- Date of birth: 8 January 1945 (age 81)
- Place of birth: Rio de Janeiro, Brazil

Managerial career
- Years: Team
- 1999: Shenyang Haishi
- 2000–2001: Iran
- 2006: Corinthians
- 2008–2010: America FC

Ademar da Silva Braga (born 8 January 1945) is a Brazilian football manager who has managed Chinese side Changsha Ginde, the Iran national team, Brazilian Série A club Corinthians and America FC.

== Career ==
After gaining a degree in Physical Education he would move into assistant coaching and physical training where he initially gained his first job as an assistant with CR Vasco da Gama in 1983. He would broaden his horizons with a move to Asia where he gained experience in Kuwait and Japanese side Cerezo Osaka upon returning to Brazil.

In 1999 Ademar took his first permanent Head coach position with top tier Chinese side Shenyang Haishi where he guided them to eleventh within the league. This was soon followed by a move to the Iran national team where despite winning all three of the games he was in charge of he was soon replaced for a more high-profile manager in Miroslav Blažević.

Ademar would return to Brazil where he continued to be an assistant before joining Brazilian Série A side Corinthians as an assistant coach in 2005. On 14 March 2006 he became their care-taker coach where he replaced Antônio Lopes before he was appointed as manager. By 10 May 2006 he was replaced by Geninho and Ademar soon returned to assistant coaching with Mirassol Futebol Clube.

== Honours ==
America FC

- Campeonato Carioca - Série B: 2009
