= Adhemar Bultheel =

Belgian mathematician and computer scientist

Adhemar François Bultheel (born 1948) is a Belgian mathematician and computer scientist, the former president of the Belgian Mathematical Society. He is a prolific book reviewer for the Bulletin of the Belgian Mathematical Society and for the European Mathematical Society. His research concerns approximation theory.

== Education and career ==
Bultheel was born in Zwijndrecht, Belgium on December 14, 1948. He earned a licenciate in mathematics in 1970 and another in industrial mathematics in 1971, both from KU Leuven. He remained at KU Leuven for a bachelor's degree in 1975 and a PhD in mathematics in 1979. His dissertation, Recursive Rational Approximation, was jointly supervised by Patrick M. Dewilde and Hugo Van de Vel.

Except for a year of military service, he was employed at KU Leuven for his entire career, retiring as a professor emeritus of computer science in 2009. He was president of the Belgian Mathematical Society for 2002–2005.

== Books ==
Bultheel is the author of:

- Laurent Series and their Padé Approximations (Operator Theory: Advances and Applications 27, Birkhäuser, 1987)
- Linear Algebra, Rational Approximation and Orthogonal Polynomials (with Marc van Barel, Studies in Computational Mathematics 6, North-Holland, 1997)
- Orthogonal Rational Functions (with Pablo González-Vera, Erik Hendriksen, and Olav Njåstad, Cambridge Monographs on Applied and Computational Mathematics 5, Cambridge University Press, 1999)
- Inleiding tot de numerieke wiskunde (Acco, 2006)
