= Ottmar Luscinius =

Alsatian Catholic Humanist

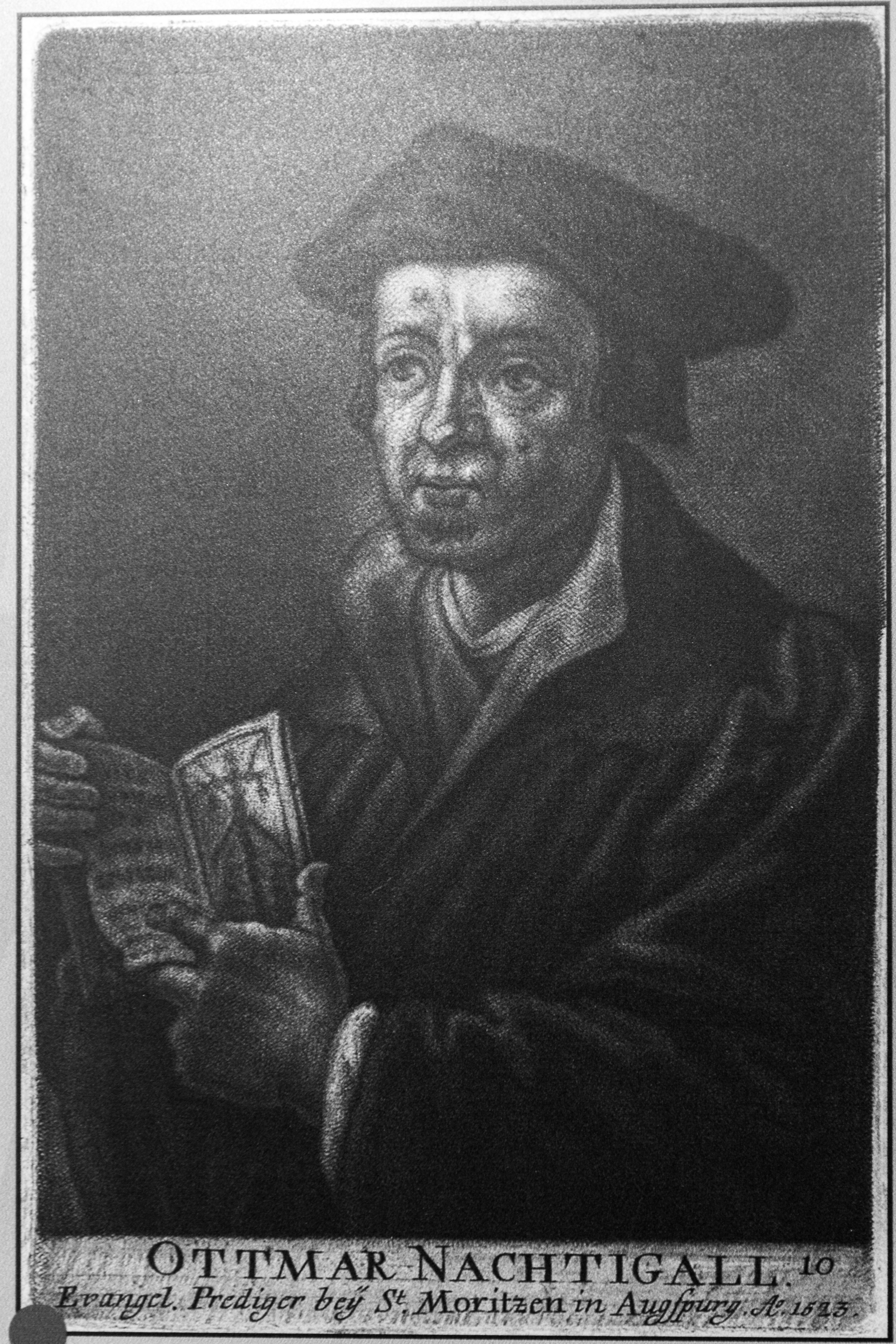
Ottmar Nachtgall (1480-1537).

Ottmar Luscinius (also called Othmar or Otmar Nachtgall) was an Alsatian Catholic Humanist who wrote Biblical commentaries; 1478 in Strasbourg – 1537 in Freiburg.

== Biography ==
After receiving instruction in Strasbourg from Jacob Wimpheling, he went in 1508 to Paris, where he studied Latin under Faustus Andrelini and Greek under Hieronymus Aleander. He then studied canon law at the Catholic University of Leuven, in Padua, and Vienna, and in the last city music also under Wolfgang Grefinger. Subsequently he travelled in Greece and Asia Minor, returning to Strasbourg in 1514. Here he became associated with Wimpheling and Sebastian Brant and mingled in literary circles. In 1515 he was appointed organist at the church of St. Thomas, and also received a vicariate, as he was a priest. In addition he taught both in the school of the Knights Hospitallers and in the cathedral school.

He spread in Strasbourg his own enthusiasm for the Greek language and literature, and published Greek manuals, collections of examples, and an edition of Lucian with a translation. In 1515 he also published a book on the elements of music (Institutiones musicae), and in 1516 issued a revised edition of the Rosella of Baptista Trovamala's compendium of cases of conscience. Luscinius went to Italy and there received the degree of Doctor of Law. In 1520 he lost his position at St. Thomas's, and failed to obtain a prebend which he had expected, but he was soon made a canon of St. Stephen's in Strasbourg. In 1523 he went to Augsburg, and there became a teacher of the Bible and of Greek at the monastery of St. Ulrich.

Although a zealous Humanist and an opponent of Scholasticism, Luscinius did not become a supporter of the Protestant Reformation. For a time, however, he certainly seems to have been friendly to it, and to have approved of the doctrine of salvation by faith alone. But he held such disputes to be specious quibbling over words, and thus at the beginning he avoided taking sides. After 1525, however, he was regarded as a reliable Catholic. The Fugger family made him preacher at the church of St. Moritz, and he became the most important champion of Catholicism in Augsburg, his sermons arousing the ill-will of the Protestants. In 1528, after he had repeatedly called the Evangelical preachers heretics, he was arrested and confined to his own house. In 1529 he was made cathedral preacher in Freiburg im Breisgau. Towards the end of his life he wished to enter the Carthusian monastery near Freiburg, but he was prevented by death.

== Other published works ==
- an edition (1518) of the Commentary on the Pauline Epistles, then ascribed to Bishop Haimo of Halberstadt. In the introduction Luscinius condemns Scholasticism and champions the study of the Bible;
- an exposition and translation of the Psalms (1524)
- a harmony of the Gospels in Latin and German (1523–25)
- the dialogue Grunnius sophista (1522), a defence of Humanistic studies
- a collection of anecdotes called Loci ac sales mire festivi (1524), written chiefly for scholarly circles and intended rather to entertain than to be satirical. It contains extracts from Greek and Roman authors, quotations from the Bible and the Church Fathers, and moral applications.
