= Amalia (given name) =

Name list

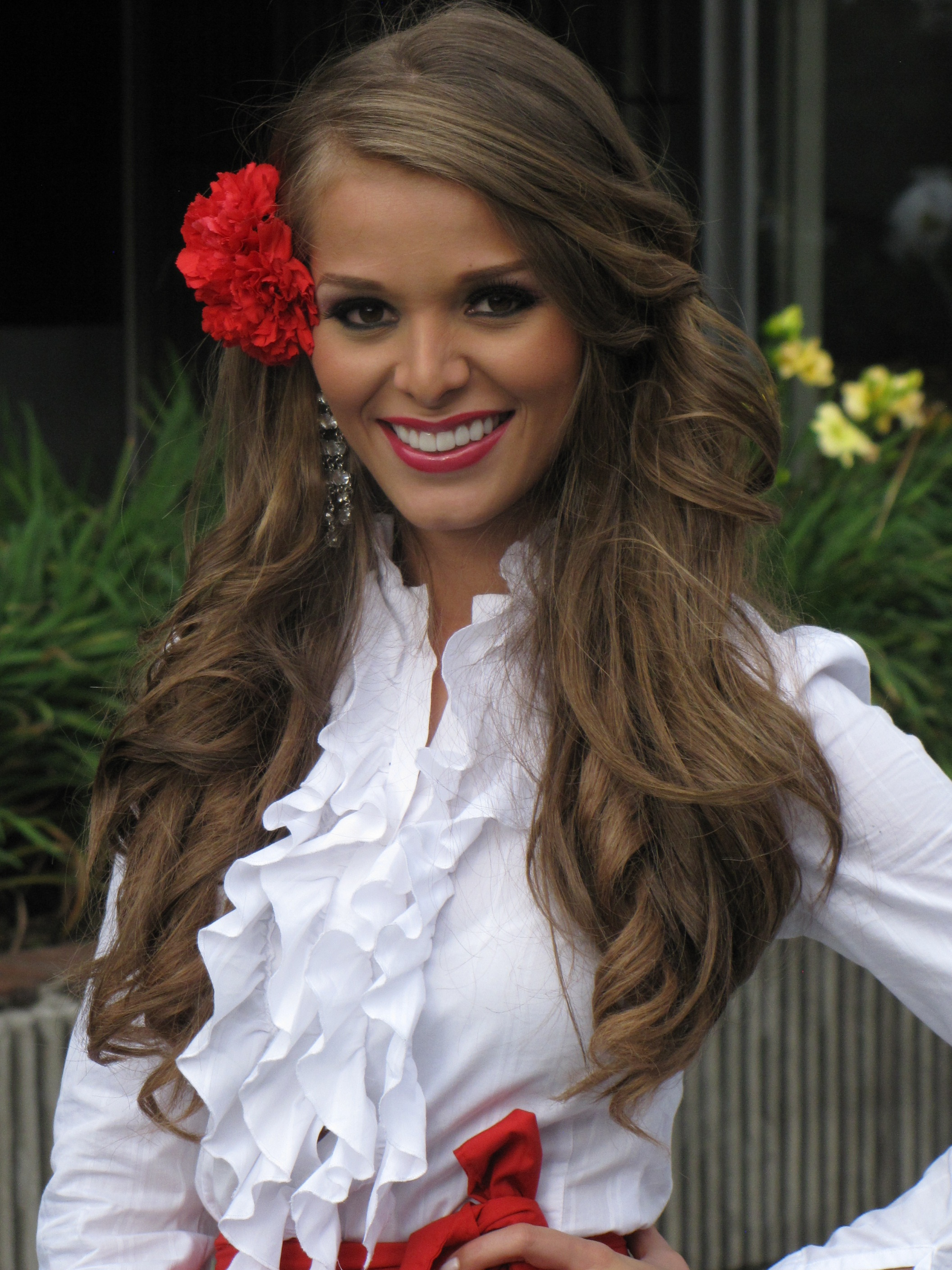
- Amalia Matamoros, Costa Rican model and beauty pageant titleholder
- Pronunciation: /əˈmɑːliə/
- Gender: Female
- Name day: 10 July (Greece)

Origin
- Languages: Germanic, Latin/Greek

Other names
- Variant forms: Amalie, Amelia, Amélie
- Short forms: Ama, Lia

Amalia is a female given name, derived possibly from Germanic amal, with meanings "vigorous, active, work", specifically the woman's name Amalberga. Its popularity is attributed to the Belgian Saint Amalberga of Maubeuge. Other origins of the name Amalia have often been associated with those of Emilia and Emily, both of which in fact originate from the Latin nomen Aemilia, or with Amalthea, which originated from the Greek name "tender goddess". In Greece, the name is celebrated on 10 July in honour of Saint Amalia.

Amalia has several variants, including Amelia in English, Amália in Portuguese, Amélia in Spanish, Amélie in French, Amalie in German, Amálie in Czech, and Amalka, a diminutive form of the name used in Slavic languages.

== Notable people ==
- Amalia Anglès y Mayer (1827–1859), Spanish soprano, guitarist
- Amalia Assur (1803–1889), Sweden's first female dentist
- Amalia Bernabé (1895–1983), Argentine actress
- Amália Bezerédj (1804–1837), Hungarian writer
- Amalia Calzavara (born 1966), Italian sprint canoer
- Amalia Carneri (1875–1943), Austrian opera singer
- Cora Amalia Castilla (born 1961), Mexican politician
- Amalia Domingo Soler (1835–1909), Spanish novelist and feminist
- Amalia Eriksson (1824–1923), Swedish business person
- Amalia Ercoli Finzi (born 1937), Italian engineer and professor
- Amalia Ferraris (1828–1904), Italian dancer
- Amalia Fleming (1912–1986), Greek activist and politician
- Amalia Freud (1835–1930), mother of Sigmund
- Amalia Fuentes (1940–2019), Filipino actress
- Amalia García (born 1951), Mexican politician
- Amalia Ghigoarță (born 2007), Romanian artistic gymnast
- Amalia González Caballero de Castillo Ledón (1898–1986), Mexican Cabinet Minister and feminist
- Amalia Guglielminetti (1881–1941), Italian poet and writer
- Amalia von Helvig (1776–1831), German-Swedish artist, writer and socialite
- Amalia Hernández (1917–2000), Mexican ballet choreographer
- Amalia Holst (1758–1829), German writer and feminist
- Amalia de Isaura (1887–1971), Spanish actress
- Amalia Kahana-Carmon (1926–2019), Israeli author and literary critic
- Amalia Kessler, American lawyer
- Amalia Küssner Coudert (1863–1932), American miniaturist
- María Amalia Lacroze de Fortabat (1921–2012), Argentine executive and philanthropist
- Amalia Lică (born 2009), Romanian rhythmic gymnast
- Amalia Lindegren, (1814–1891), Swedish painter
- Amalia Puga de Losada (1866–1963), Peruvian writer, poet, novelist and essayist
- Amalia Matamoros (born 1989), winner of Miss World Costa Rica in 2008
- Amalberga of Maubeuge (died c. 690), Lotharingian saint (modern-day Belgium)
- Amalia Mendoza (1923–2001), Mexican actress and singer
- Amalia Mesa-Bains (born 1943), American psychologist and author
- Amalia Miranzo (1939–2014), Spanish politician
- Amalia Molina (1881–1956), Spanish tonadillera and dancer
- Amalia Pachelbel (1688–1723), German painter and engraver
- Amalia Paoli (1861–1941), Puerto Rican opera singer
- Amalia Pellegrini (1873–1958), Italian actress
- Amalia Pérez (born 1977), Mexican powerlifter
- Amalia Pica (born 1978), Argentine artist
- Amalia Planck (1834–1908), Swedish entrepreneur
- Amalia Del Ponte (born 1936), Italian artist and designer
- Amalia Post (1836–1897), American suffragist
- Amalia Ramírez (1834–1918), Spanish singer
- Amalia Riégo (1850–1926), Swedish opera singer
- Amália Rodrigues (1920–1999), Portuguese singer
- Amalia Sánchez Ariño (1839–1969), Argentine actress
- Amalia Sartori (born 1947), Italian politician
- Amalia Solórzano (1911–2008), former First Lady of Mexico
- Amália Sterbinszky (1950–2025), Hungarian handball player
- Amalia Streitel (1844–1911), German religious sister
- Amalia Tătăran (born 1994), Romanian fencer
- Amalia Ulman (born 1989), Argentine artist
- Amalia Uys (born 1984), South African actress
- Maria Amália Vaz de Carvalho (1847–1921), Portuguese writer and poet
- Amalia de la Vega (1919–2000), Uruguayan singer
- Amalia Williamson (born 1999), Canadian actress
- Amalia Yoo (born 2002), American actress

=== Nobility and royalty ===
- Amalia Catharina (1640–1697)
- Amalia de Llano (1822–1874)
- Amalia Golitsyna (1748–1806)
- Amalia Margaretha van Brederode (1625–1663)
- Amalia of Cleves (1517–1586)
- Amalia of Neuenahr (1539–1602)
- Amalia of Oldenburg (1818–1875), Queen of Greece (1836–1862)
- Amalia of Saxony, Duchess of Bavaria (1436–1501)
- Amalia of Solms-Braunfels (1602–1675)
- Amalia von Dyhrn (1790–1866)
- Amalia von Hatzfeld (1560–1628)
- Amalia Wilhelmina Königsmarck (1663–1740)
- Anna Amalia of Baden-Durlach (1595–1651)
- Anna Amalia, Abbess of Quedlinburg (1723–1787)
- Archduchess Maria Amalia of Austria (1746–1804)
- Archduchess Maria Amalia of Austria (1780–1798)
- Catharina-Amalia, Princess of Orange (born 2003)
- Charlotte Amalia of Nassau-Dillenburg (1680–1738)
- Duchess Anna Amalia of Brunswick-Wolfenbüttel (1739–1807)
- Hedvig Amalia Charlotta Klinckowström (1777–1810)
- Infanta María Amalia of Spain (1779–1798)
- Józefina Amalia Mniszech (1752–1798)
- Maria Amalia of Courland (1653–1711)
- Maria Amalia of Naples and Sicily (1818–1857)
- Maria Amalia of Nassau-Dillenburg (1582–1635)
- Maria Amalia of Saxony (1724–1760)
- Maria Amalia von Brühl (1736–1772)
- Maria Amalia, Holy Roman Empress (1701–1756)
- Maria Josepha Amalia of Saxony (1803–1829)
- Princess Amalia of Nassau-Dietz (1710–1777)
- Princess Amalia of Saxe-Weimar-Eisenach (1830–1872)
- Princess Amalia of Sweden (1805–1853)
- Princess Anna Amalia of Prussia (1723–1787)
- Princess Frederica Amalia of Denmark (1649–1704)
- Princess Henriëtte Amalia of Anhalt-Dessau (1666–1726)
- Princess Maria Amalia of Bourbon-Two Sicilies (1818–1857)
- Princess Maria Amalia of Saxony (1757–1831)
- Sophia Amalia Marschalk (17th century)

== Fictional characters ==
- Víla Amálka - Fairy Amalka, from Czech animated fairy tale with this name

== See also ==
- Amalia (disambiguation)
- Princess Amalia (disambiguation)
