= Amalie (given name) =

- Pronunciation: /amaːljə/
- Gender: Female
- Language: German, North Germanic languages Scandinavian

Origin
- Meaning: "Work"

Other names
- See also: Amalia, Amelia, Amélie

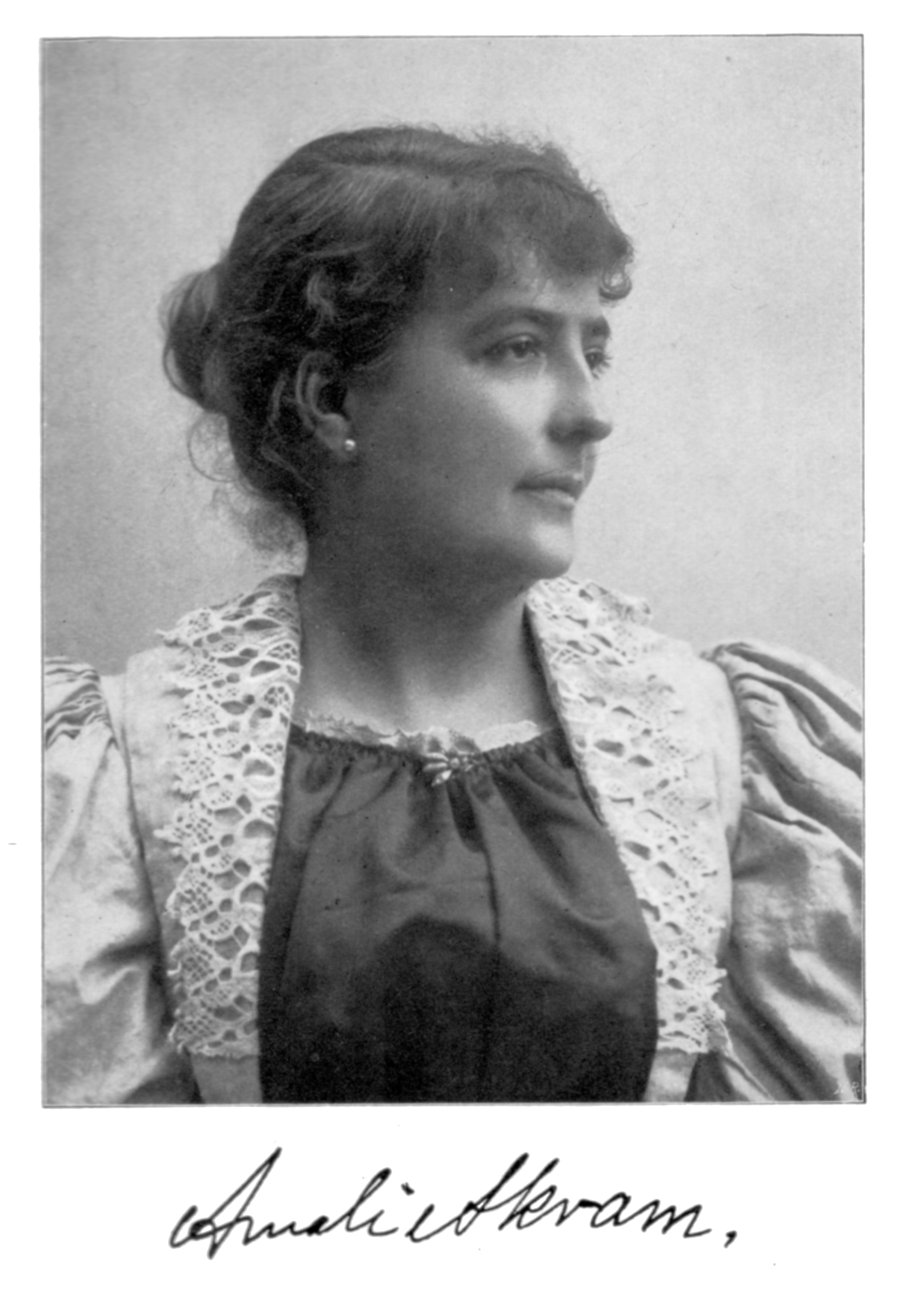
Amalie Skram

Amalie is a feminine given name. It is a German variant of the name Amalia. It is derived from the root word 'amal', meaning 'work' in German, 'hope' in Arabic and 'water' in Scots-Gaelic.

Notable people with the name include:

- Amalie Andersen (born 1999), Danish ice hockey player
- Amalie Andersen (actress) (1861–1924), Norwegian actress
- Cristiane Luise Amalie Becker (1778–1797), German actress
- Amalie Benjamin (born 1982), American sportswriter
- Amalie Bruun, (born 1985), Danish singer and songwriter
- Amalie Sara Colquhoun (1894–1974), Australian landscape and portrait painter
- Amalie Dietrich (1821–1891), German naturalist
- Amalie Grøn Hansen (born 1996), Danish handballer
- Amalie Hofer (1820–1872), German revolutionary
- Amalie Kass (1928–2019), American historian
- Amalie Konsa (1873–1949), Estonian actress
- Amalie von Lasaulx (1815–1872), German nun
- Amalie Malling (born 1948), Danish classical pianist
- Amalie Nacken (1855–1940 Munich), German philanthropist
- Amalie "Emmy" Noether (1882–1935), German mathematician
- Lisbeth Cathrine Amalie Rose (1738–1793), Danish actress
- Amalie Schoppe (1791–1858), German writer
- Klara Amalie Skoglund (1891–1978), Norwegian politician
- Amalie Skram (1846–1905), Norwegian author and feminist
- Amalie Wichmann (born 1995), Danish handball player
- Amalie Winter (1803–1879), German writer

== Nobility and royalty ==
- Archduchess Amalie Theresa of Austria (1807), daughter of Francis II, Holy Roman Emperor
- Amalie Auguste of Bavaria (1801–1877), Princess of Bavaria and Queen of Saxony
- Sophie Amalie of Brunswick-Lüneburg (1628–1685), queen-consort of Denmark and Norway
- Duchess Louise Amalie of Brunswick-Wolfenbüttel (1722–1780), daughter of Ferdinand Albert II, Duke of Brunswick-Lüneburg
- Frederikke Amalie of Denmark (1649–1704), duchess of Holstein-Gottorp
- Landgravine Amalie of Hesse-Darmstadt (1754–1832), daughter of Ludwig IX, Landgrave of Hesse-Darmstadt and Henriette Karoline of Palatine-Zweibrücken
- Landgravine Elisabeth Amalie of Hesse-Darmstadt (1635–1709), Electress Palatine
- Charlotte Amalie of Hesse-Kassel (or Hesse-Cassel) (1650–1714), Danish queen consort
- Sophie Amalie Moth (1654–1719), countess of Samsø
- Amalie Zephyrine of Salm-Kyrburg (1760–1841), German princess
- Amalie, Princess of Saxony (1794–1870), German composer and Princess of Saxony
- Amalie von Wallmoden, Countess of Yarmouth (1704–1765), mistress of George II of Great Britain

== See also ==
- Amalie (disambiguation)
- Amélie (given name)
- Amalia (given name)
