= Amélie (given name) =

- Pronunciation: /ameˈli/
- Gender: Female
- Language: French

Origin
- Origin: Germanic
- Meaning: "Work"

Other names
- Short forms: Amy, Lia
- See also: Amalia, Amelia, Amalie

Amélie is a French feminine given name, ultimately derived from the Germanic name Amalia.

The variant form Amelie is used outside the Francophone world, sometimes by French people.

== People with the given name ==
- Amélie Beaury-Saurel (1849–1924), French painter
- Amelie Beese (1886–1925), German aviator
- Amélie Belin, French painter and pastellist
- Amélie Cocheteux (born 1978), former French professional tennis player
- Amélie Coquet (born 1984), French football player
- Amélie Cordeau (born 2005), French archer
- Amélie d'Orléans (1865–1951), the eldest daughter of Prince Philippe, Count of Paris
- Amelie Delagrange (1982–2004), French murder victim
- Amélie Diéterle (1871–1941), French actress and opera singer
- Amélie Gex (1835–1883), Savoyard poet
- Amélie Goudjo (born 1980), French handball player
- Amélie Goulet-Nadon (born 1983), Canadian short track speed skater
- Amélie Jakobovits (1928–2010), British charity patron
- Amelie Kober (born 1987), German snowboarder
- Amélie Kuhrt (1944–2023), historian and specialist in the history of the ancient Near East
- Amélie Lacoste (born 1988), Canadian figure skater
- Amélie Le Fur (born 1988), French Paralympian athlete
- Amélie of Leuchtenberg (1812–1873), Empress of Brazil as the wife of Emperor Pedro I
- Amélie Linz (1824–1904), German author
- Amélie Lundahl (1850–1914), Finnish painter
- Amélie Mauresmo (born 1979), retired professional tennis player
- Amelie Muthsam (born 2002), Austrian politician
- Amélie Nothomb (born 1967), Belgian writer
- Amélie Perrin (born 1980), French female hammer thrower
- Amélie Plume (born 1943), Swiss writer
- Amelie Posse (1884–1957), Swedish writer
- Amélie Rives Troubetzkoy (1863–1945), American novelist and poet
- Amélie Sarn (born 1970), French author, comic book writer and translator
- Amelie von Strussenfelt (1803–1847), Swedish novelist
- Amelie Veiller Van Norman (1844–1920), French-born American educator

== Fictional characters ==
- Amélie Lacroix, better known as Widowmaker, a character in the video game Overwatch
- Amelie Planchard, a character in the anime series Strike Witches
- Amélie Poulain, protagonist of the film Amélie
- Lady Amelie Graham de Vanily, a character in the cartoon Miraculous: Tales of Ladybug & Cat Noir

== See also ==
- Amélie (disambiguation)
- Amélie, a French film
- Amalie (given name)
- Amelia (given name)
