= Amalia =

Amalia may refer to:

== People ==
- Amalia (given name), feminine given name (includes a list of people so named)
- Princess Amalia (disambiguation), several princesses with this name

== Films and television series ==
- Amalia (1914 film), the first full-length Argentine film
- Amalia (1936 film), an Argentine remake of the 1914 movie
- Amália (film), a 2008 Portuguese film biography of singer Amália Rodrigues
- Amalia, a South African television series
- Amalia Sheran Sharm, one of the main protagonists in the animated television series Wakfu

== Places ==
- Amalia, New Mexico, US
- Amalia, North West, South Africa

== Other uses ==
- Amalia (novel), an Argentine novel written by José Mármol
- "Amalia" (Schubert), D 195, Op. 173 No. 1, song by Franz Schubert, based on a text by Schiller
- Amalia (steamship), a general cargo steamship built by J&G Thomson for the Papayanni Brothers in 1861
- 284 Amalia, a large main belt asteroid
- Laelia, a genus of orchids, formerly called AMALIA)

== See also ==
- Amalie (disambiguation)
- Amélie (disambiguation)
