= Malling =

Malling may refer to:

== Places ==
- Malling, Denmark
- Malling, Moselle, France
- Malling, Queensland
- Malling Rural District, a former district of Kent, England
- East Malling, a village in Kent, England
- West Malling, a market town in Kent, England

== People ==
- Amalie Malling (born 1948), Danish classical pianist
- Jens Malling (1909–1969), Swedish diplomat
- Otto Malling (1848–1915), Danish composer
- Rasmus Malling-Hansen (1835–1890), Danish inventor, minister and principal at the Royal Institute for the Deaf
- Søren Malling (born 1964), Danish actor

== Other uses ==
- Malling series, rootstocks for apple trees, classified at the East Malling Research Station
