= Princess Amelia =

Princess Amelia or Princess Amelie may refer to:

== People ==
- Princess Amelia of Great Britain (1711–1786), daughter of George II of Great Britain
- Princess Amelia of the United Kingdom (1783–1810), daughter of George III of the United Kingdom
- Princess Amélie Louise of Arenberg (1789 - 1823), member of the Palatinate-Birkenfeld-Gelnhausen line of the House of Wittelsbach, grandmother of Empress Elisabeth of Austria
- Princess Louise Amelie of Baden (1811 - 1854), daughter of Karl, Grand Duke of Baden and his wife Stéphanie de Beauharnais
- Princess Marie Amelie of Baden (1817 - 1888), youngest daughter of Karl, Grand Duke of Baden and Stephanie de Beauharnais, the adopted daughter of Napoleon I of France

== Other ==
- HMS Princess Amelia, ships of the Royal Navy named after one of the above
- Princess Amelia (1634 ship), a Dutch West India Company ship
- Amelia Wil Tesla Seyruun, a character from the light novel series Slayers

== See also ==
- Princess Amalia (disambiguation)
