= Amalie =

Amalie may refer to:

- Amalie (given name), a female given name, derived from Amalia
- Benchmark International Arena, a hockey stadium in Tampa, Florida formerly known as Amalie Arena
- Amalie Oil Company, American motor oil producer
- MV Amalie, an Estonian and former Norwegian ferry

== See also ==
- Amélie (disambiguation)
- Amalia (disambiguation)
- AmaLee (born 1992), U.S. singer and voice actress
- Charlotte Amalie, U.S. Virgin Islands, capital of the territory
