= Amália Bezerédj =

Hungarian writer

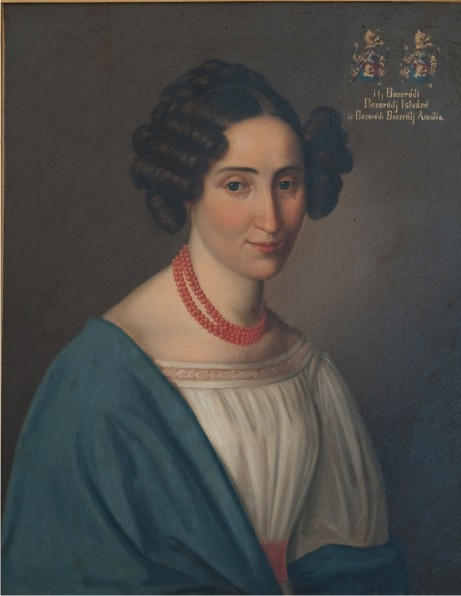
- Born: April 15, 1804; Szentivánfa, Austrian Empire
- Died: September 21, 1837 (aged 33); Szentivánfa, Kingdom of Hungary, Austrian Empire
- Occupation: Writer
- Spouse: István Bezerédj
- Writing career
- Pen name: Malby
- Genre: Children's literature
- Notable work: Flóri könyve (1836)

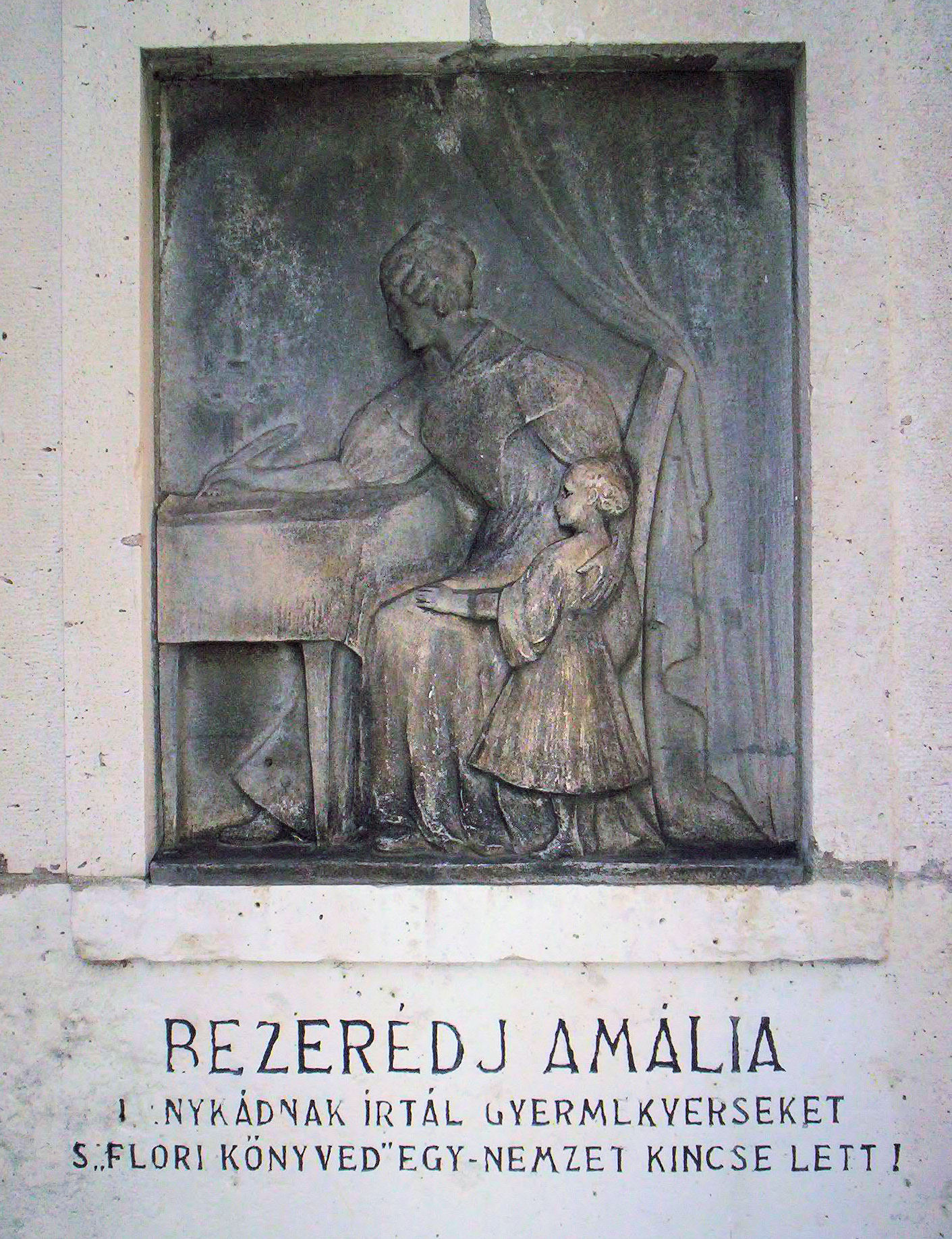
Amália Bezerédj

Amália Bezerédj (1804–1837) was a Hungarian writer. She founded a school on her husband's estate and wrote Flóri könyve, 'Flori's Book' for her daughter. This is considered the first significant Hungarian children's book, although it and her other work, a reader for village children, were not published until three years after her death.
