= Amalie Benjamin =

American sportswriter

- Born: Newton, Massachusetts
- Occupation: Sports journalist/television personality
- Title: NHL.com staff writer formerly Boston Red Sox beat reporter / general assignment sports reporter for The Boston Globe
- Website: https://www.nhl.com/news/

Amalie Zara Benjamin is a writer for the National Hockey League, having previously written for The Boston Globe as a Boston Red Sox beat reporter. She graduated from Northwestern University in 2004 with a degree in English. She lives in the Allston neighborhood of Boston.

== Journalism career ==
Benjamin began her journalism career in 2001, as a stringer for the Community Newspaper Company in Needham, Massachusetts. Over the next three years she interned at the Worcester Telegram & Gazette in Worcester, Massachusetts, The Times-Picayune in New Orleans, Louisiana, and The Washington Post''. While in college, she was a contributor and sports editor for the Daily Northwestern’s weekly football magazine, Gameday.

She joined The Boston Globe after graduating from college, and she initially covered high school sports. After the departure of Chris Snow from the Globe in 2006, she started covering the Red Sox as the backup beat reporter and also worked as a general-assignment sports reporter. When Gordon Edes left in August 2008, the Globe promoted her to Red Sox beat writer. Benjamin announced in November 2010 that she had left her position as Red Sox beat reporter and would become a feature writer for the Globe.

In addition to her columns in the Globe, Benjamin regularly appeared on the New England Sports Network's (NESN) Red Sox pre-game show to discuss the team.

Benjamin married Kenneth Gantz in 2010, and changed roles at the Globe to avoid a beat writer's travel during her marriage. The couple later separated. In August 2014, she married Daniel Barbarisi. She also worked as the beat writer covering the Boston Bruins for the Globe.

In March 2016, Benjamin left the Globe to write for NHL.com, the website of National Hockey League.
