= Amalie Winter =

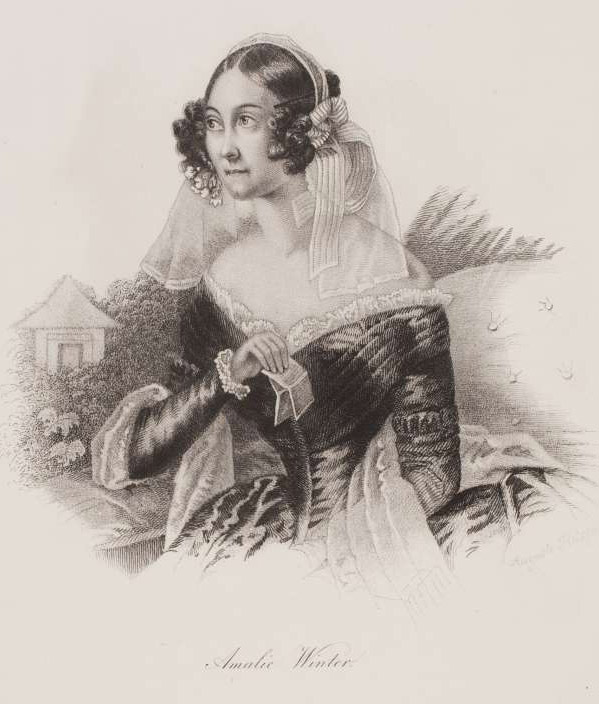
Amalie Winter. Portrait by Auguste Hüssener.

Amalie Winter was the pen name used by Amalie Karoline Charlotte Wilhelmine Henriette von Seebach (1802–1879), a German poet and novelist.

== Biography ==
Amalie Karoline Charlotte Wilhelmine Henriette von Seebach was born in Weimar, Germany, 1802. Her father was Prussian major general Friedrich Johann Christian Heinrich von Seebach (1767–1847); her mother was Henriette Sophie Wilhelmine von Seebach, née von Stein-Nordheim (1773–1817).

In early life, she became acquainted with Johann Wolfgang von Goethe, and her taste and mind were formed under his influence. In 1821, the day she turned 19, she married Ludwig Albrecht Joseph Gabriel Freiherr von Groß (1793–1857), who later became privy financial advisor of Saxony.

At the age of 27, her writing appeared as contributions to a popular Weimar journal Chaos (1829–1832). In 1838, she published "Pictures of German Life,” and afterwards novelettes: Pictures of Women; Recollections of a Leaden Soldier, for children from ages 8 to 10 (1840); Recollections of a Berlin Doll, for children from ages 5 to 10 and their mothers (1844); Fairytales of Nature; and The Diadem and the Scepter. She wrote a great many works for children and poems. She also translated English works of Lady Blessington (1841), Charles Dickens (1841) and Thomas De Quincey (1840) into German.

== Sources ==
- A Cyclopaedia of Female Biography (1857) by Henry Gardiner Adams
- Initials and Pseudonyms: A Dictionary of Literary Disguises (1885) by William Cushing
- FrauenGestalten Weimar-Jena um 1800. Ein bio-bibliographisches Lexikon. Edited by Stefanie Freyer, Katrin Horn, Nicole Grochowina. Heidelberg: Universitaetsverlag Winter, 2009.
