= Amalie Nacken =

German philanthropist

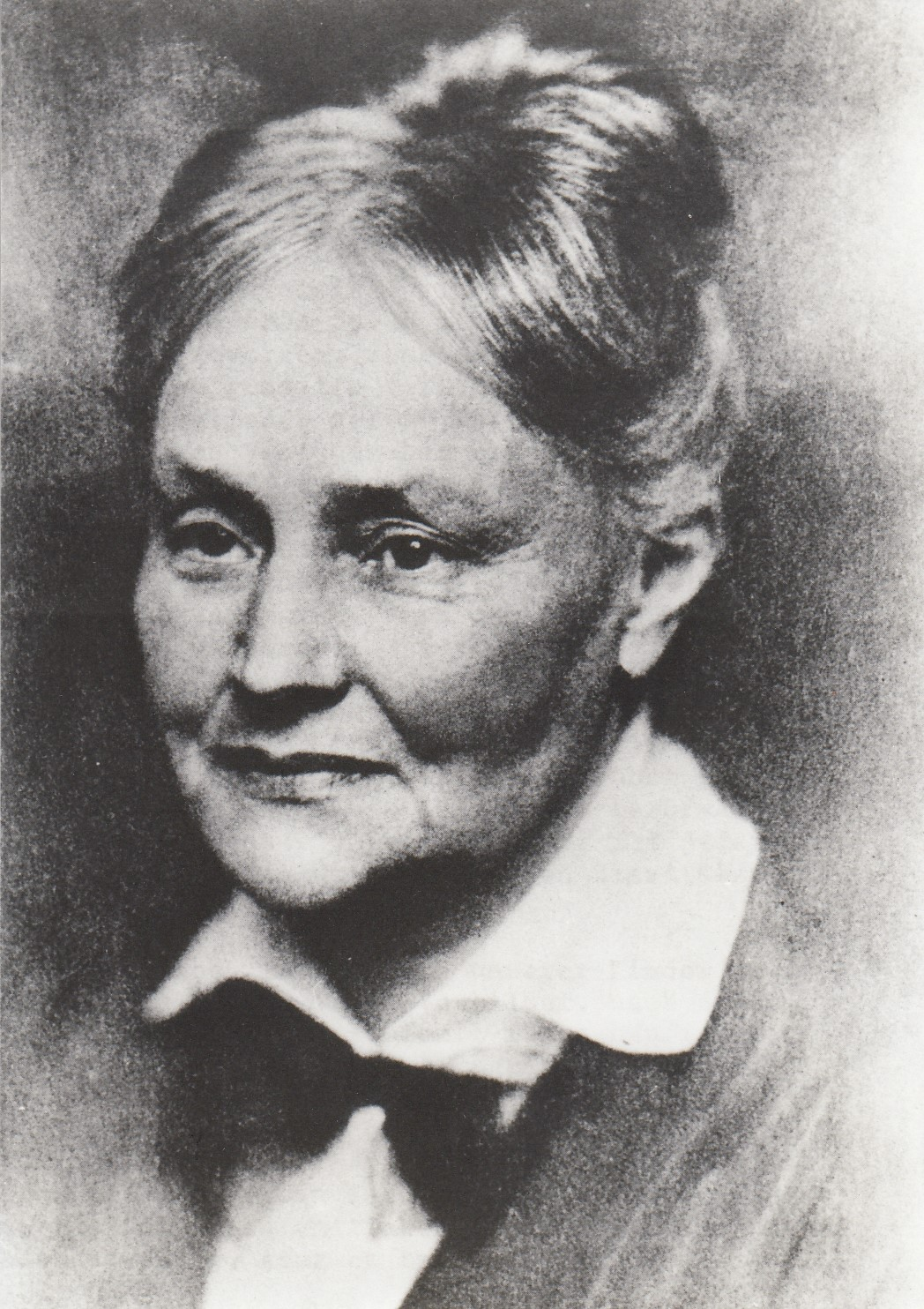
- Nacken (circa 1920)
- Born: 17 April 1855; Gillrath
- Died: 6 September 1940 (aged 85); Munich, Germany
- Occupation: Philanthropist

Amalie Nacken (born 17 April 1855 in Gillrath; died 6 September 1940 in Munich) was a German philanthropist who was an abolitionist and protected German youth against neglect and maltreatment. In 1924–1925, she used her own fortune to establish two homes for children.

== Life and work ==
She was the daughter of a landowner and received a private education until the age of 15. Afterwards, Amalie Nacken led the life of a "housemaid". At the age of 45 she decided to live on her own and moved to Munich. There Amalie Nacken became involved in the "Association for Women's Interests", which was founded in 1894 under the name "Society for the Promotion of Women's Intellectual Interests". Within the "Association for Women's Interests", which still calls itself today, she was responsible for the "Youth Group Department" and the "Local Group Commission". She worked closely with Ika Freudenberg, Sophia Goudstikker, Julie Kerschensteiner, Helene Sumper, Rosa Kempf and Luise Kiesselbach, among others. Furthermore, Amalie Nacken volunteered in public youth welfare:

"Wir sehen sie unermüdlich als eine der ersten Gemeindewaisenrätinnen jahrelang wirken. Ebenso arbeitete sie viele Jahre als Schöffin am Jugendgericht. Später war sie langjähriges Mitglied des Geschäftsausschusses im Jugenddienst und im Sitzungsausschuß des Wohlfahrtsamtes. Besonders am Herzen lag ihr auch der Verein für weibliche Vormundschaften... Auch der Verein für Frauen, Mädchen, der Jugendfürsorgeverein, der Verein Helene Sumperheim, das Prinzessin-Ludwig-Kinderheim u. a., alle diese zählten sie zu ihren Mitgliedern."

(in English: We see her working tirelessly as one of the first municipal orphan councillors for many years. Likewise, she worked for many years as a juror at the juvenile court. Later she was a long-standing member of the business committee in the youth service and the meeting committee of the welfare office. The association for female guardianships was also particularly close to her heart.... She was also a member of the Association for Women, Girls, the Youth Welfare Association, the Helene Sumperheim Association, the Princess Ludwig Children's Home and others")

In addition, she was chairwoman of the Bavarian branch of the "International Abolitionist Federation" and an active co-initiator of the "Stadtbund Münchner Frauenvereine", founded in 1914, today: "Stadtbund Münchner Frauenverbände", of which she was chairwoman from 1929 to 1932. She was particularly interested in the association Kinderschutz e. V., founded in Munich in 1901, which still exists today:

She joined the board as early as 1905, then became deputy chairwoman, then first chairwoman in 1912 and remained so until she was elevated to honorary chairwoman in 1934. The purpose of the association is to protect German youth against neglect and maltreatment.

When the Paritätische Wohlfahrtsverband (Parity Welfare Association) was founded in Munich in 1924, Amalie Nacken was instrumental in getting the association Kinderschutz e. V. to become a member. In 1924/25, she used her private fortune to found two children's homes, a girls' home in Dachau (in the former Carl Bössenroth Villa), which bore her name from 1958 until its closure at the historic site (2010), and a boys' home in Munich-Pasing. For both homes, she handed over the sponsorship to the "Verein Kinderschutz e. V.". When the National Socialists came to power, Amalie Nacken withdrew from public life as a Jewish woman, but continued to work "quietly" for needy children.

The boys' home in Pasing was closed in 1939, the Amalie Nacken children's home in Dachau in 2010.

In the Munich district of Freiham, a street was named after Amalie Nacken.

== Bibliography ==
- Der Stadtbund Münchner Frauenvereine, in: Bayerische Frauenzeitung 1929/H. 4, S. 12–13
- Manfred Berger: Nacken, Amalie – Gründerin von Erziehungsheimen, in: Hugo Maier (Edit.): Who is who der Sozialen Arbeit, Freiburg/Brsg. 1998, P. 423
- Florentine Rickmers: Gedenkrede für Amalie Nacken, Munich 1940
