= Amélie Lundahl =

Finnish artist (1850–1914)

Helga Amélie Lundahl
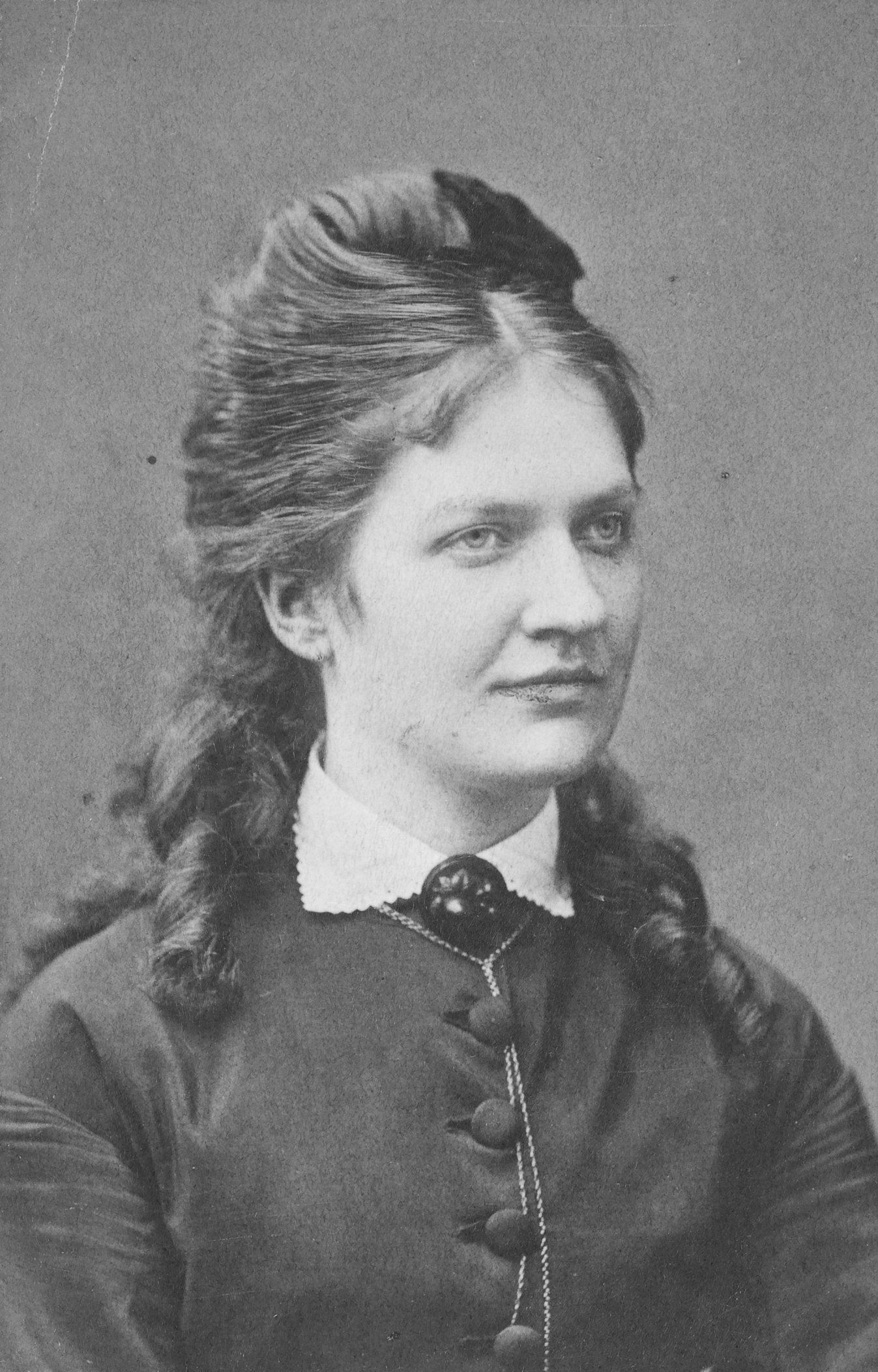
- Lundahl in the 1880s
- Born: 26 May 1850; Oulu, Finland
- Died: 20 August 1914 (aged 64); Helsinki, Finland
- Known for: Painting

Helga Amélie Lundahl (26 May 1850 – 20 August 1914) was a Finnish painter.

== Biography ==
She was born in Oulu, the youngest of eleven children. Her mother died when she was three months old and her father, Abraham, a Town Representative (public prosecutor) died when she was eight.

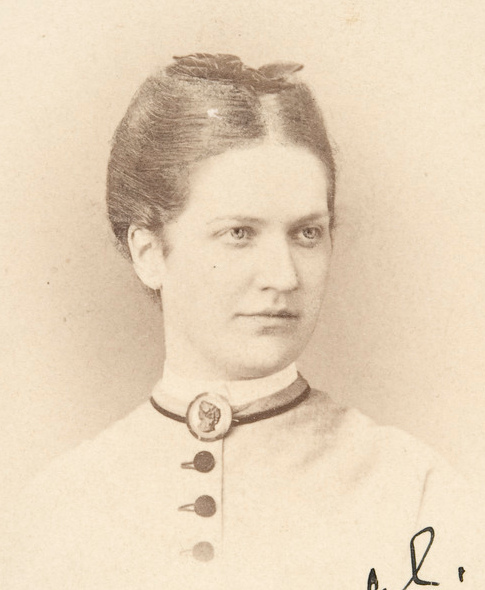
Lundahl in 1860–1875

From 1860 to 1862, she attended the "Svenska Privatskolan" in Oulu. From 1872 to 1876 she studied at the Academy of Fine Arts, Helsinki, with a brief stay at the School of Art and Design in Stockholm, which was made possible by a travel grant. Another travel grant enabled her to go to Paris, where she studied at the Académie Julian with Tony Robert-Fleury, among others, from 1877 to 1881. She stayed there for twelve years altogether, and Brittany became her favorite location for painting.

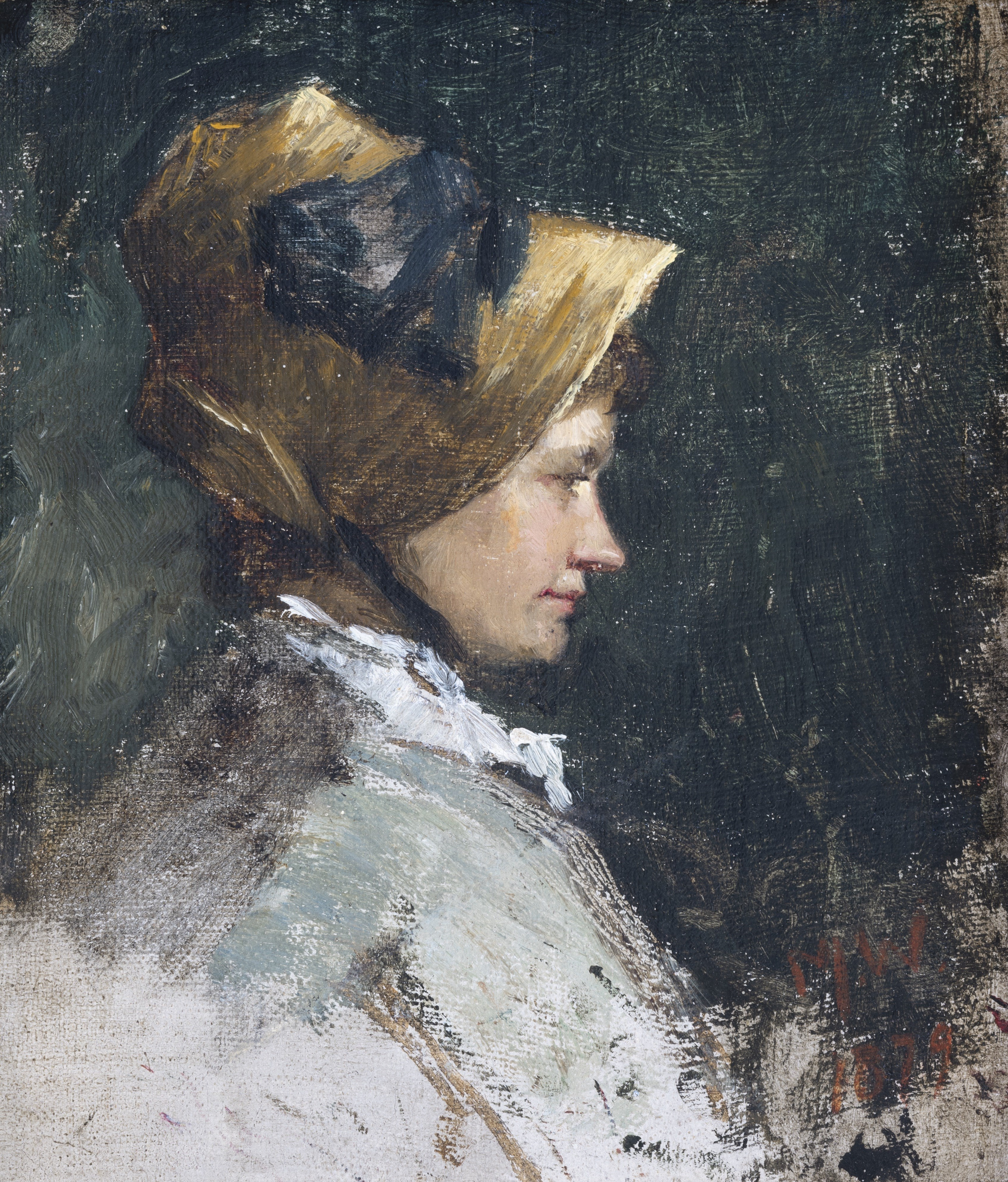
Portrait by Maria Wiik, 1879

After returning to Finland in 1889, she and Victor Westerholm helped to found the "Önningebykolonin", an art colony in the village of Önningeby in Åland.

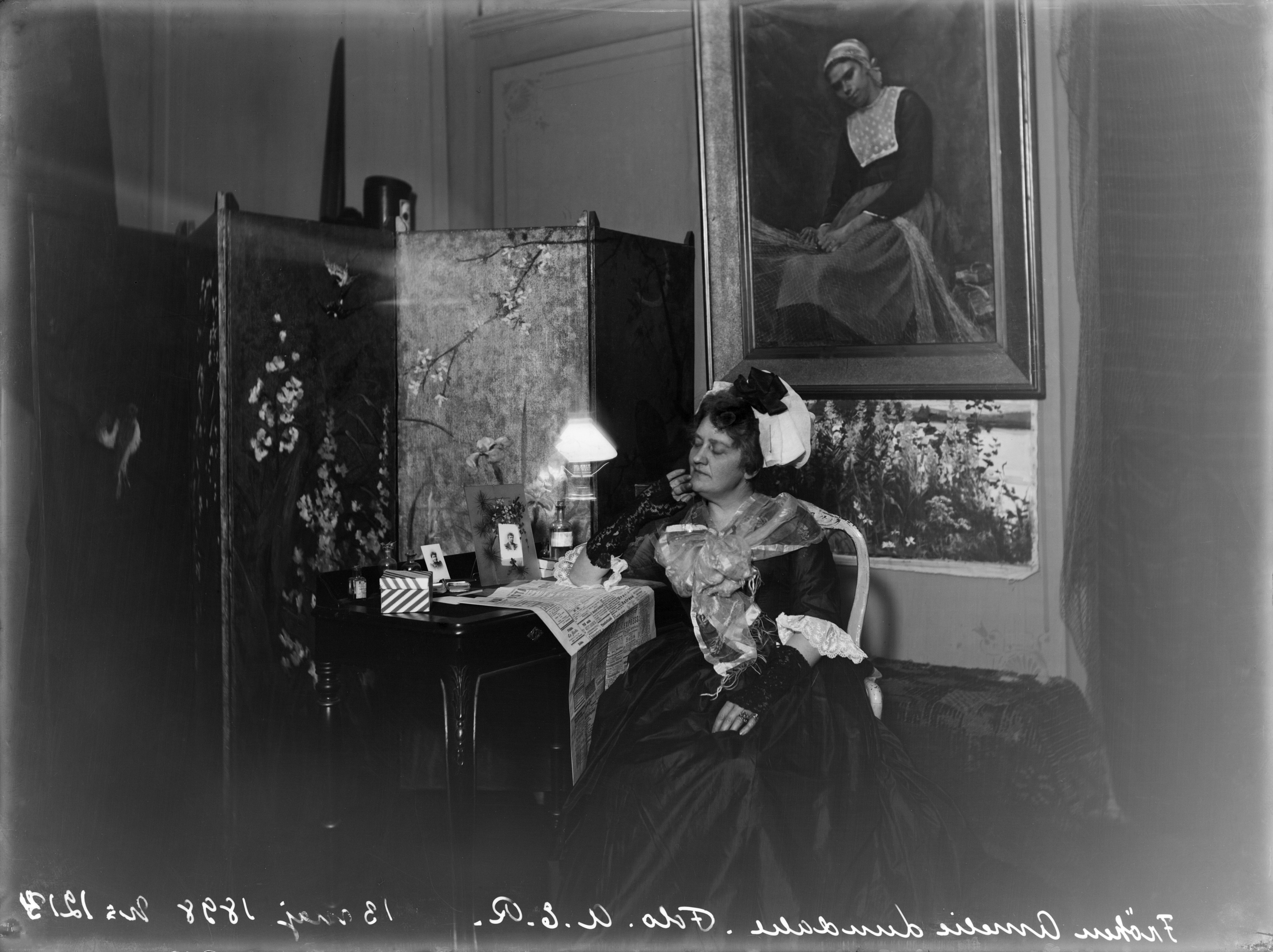
At her home in 1898

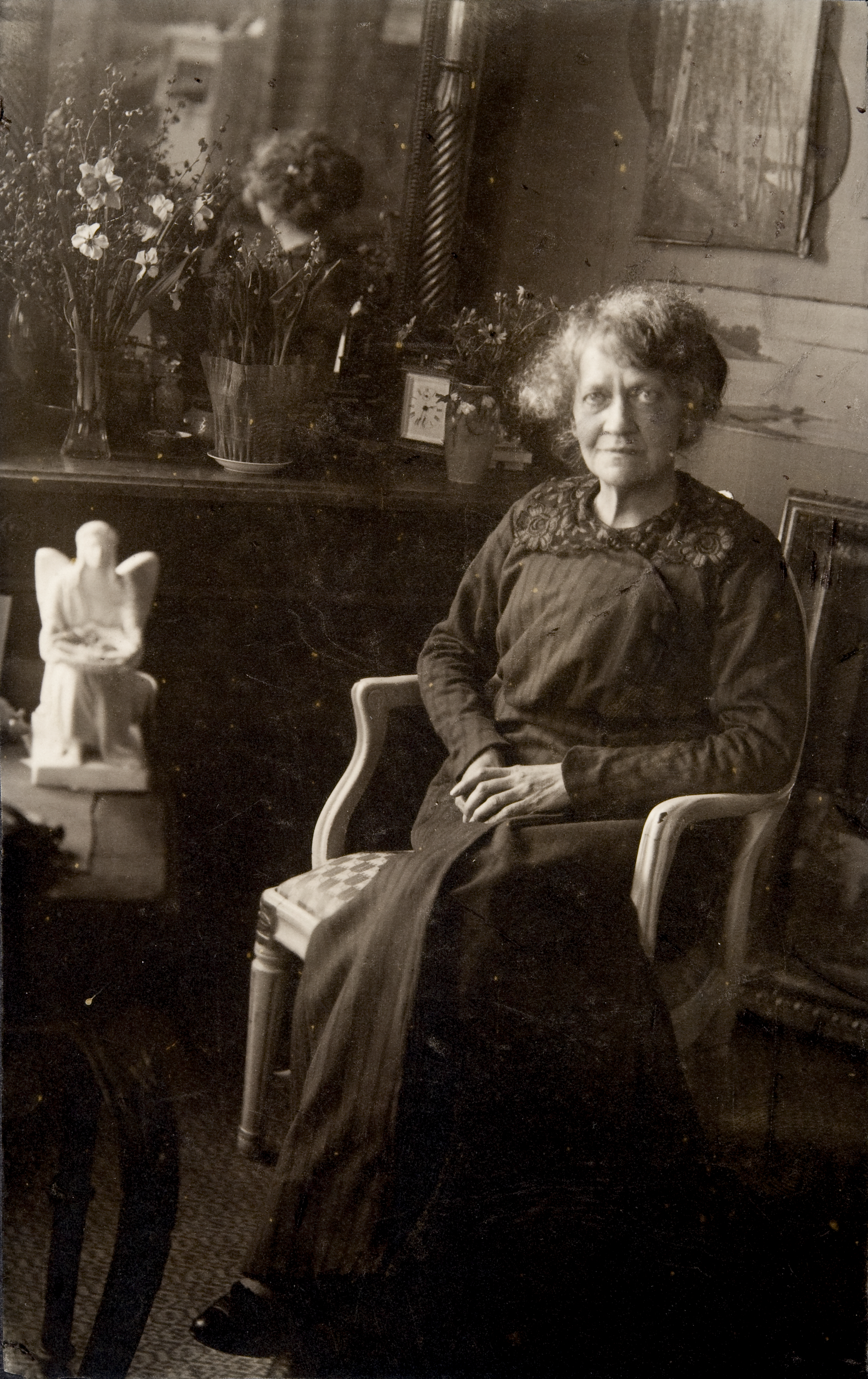
Lundahl in 1914

She died in 1914 in Helsinki. It is believed that her death was caused by leukemia.

== Gallery ==
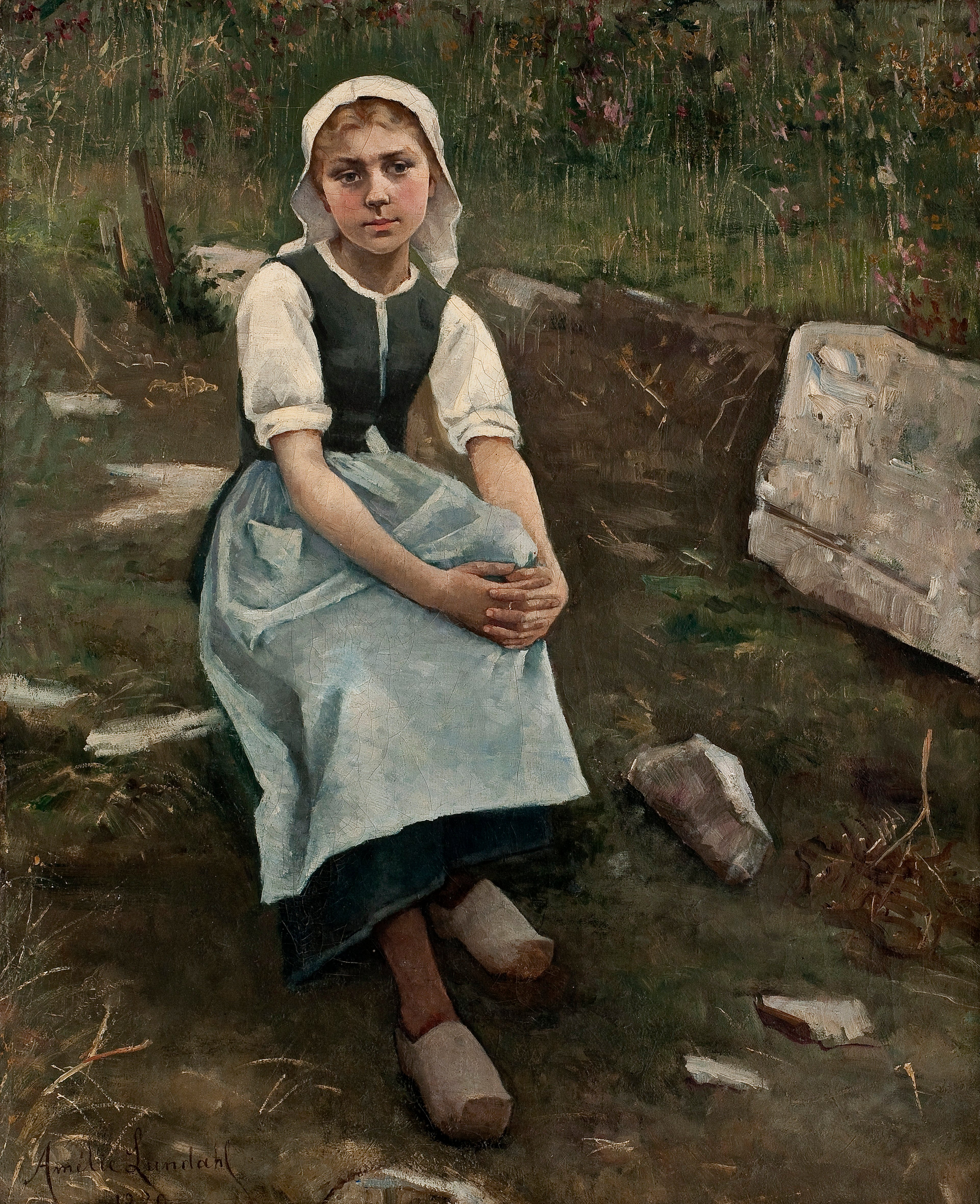
Girl from Brittany, 1880

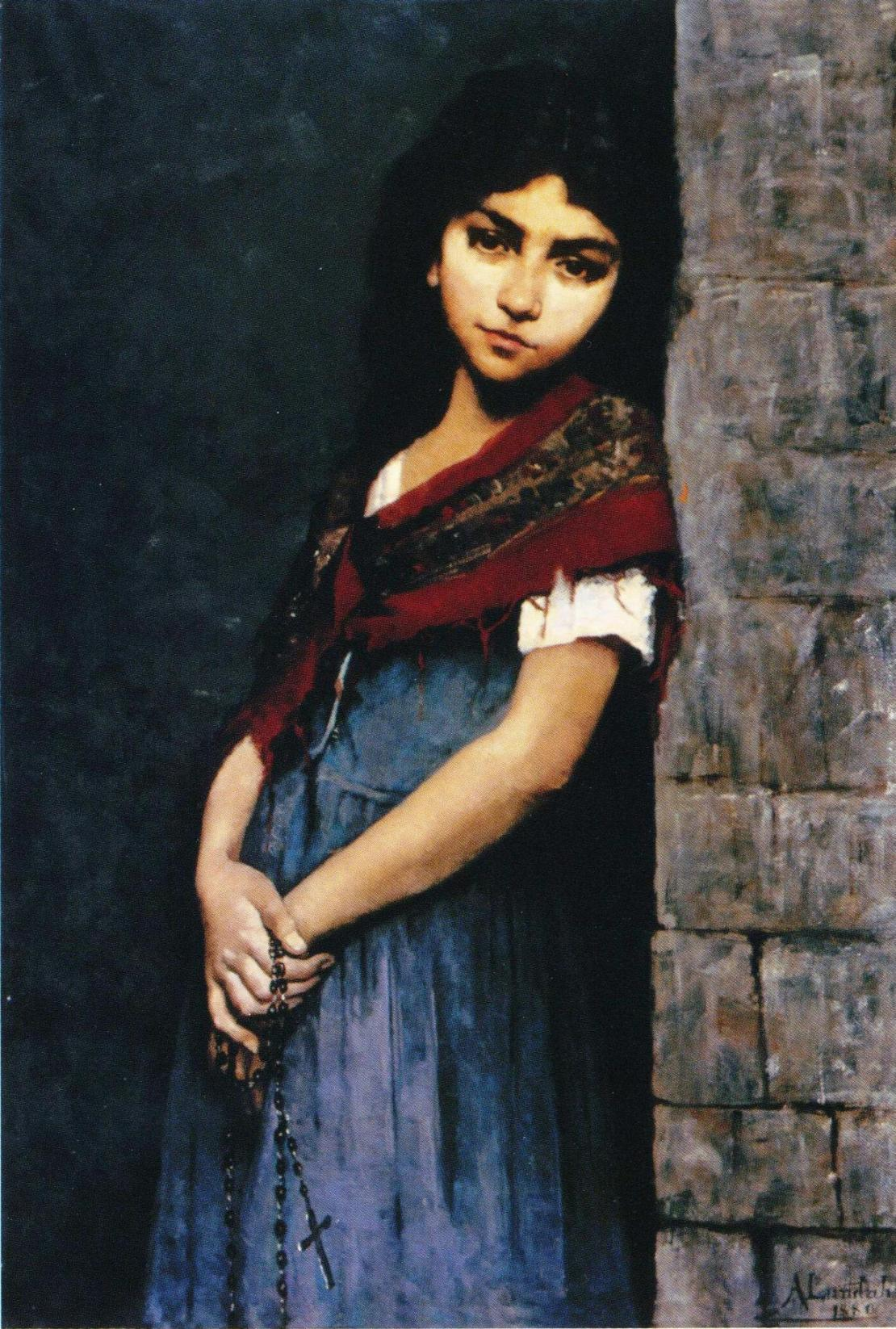
Outside the Church, 1880

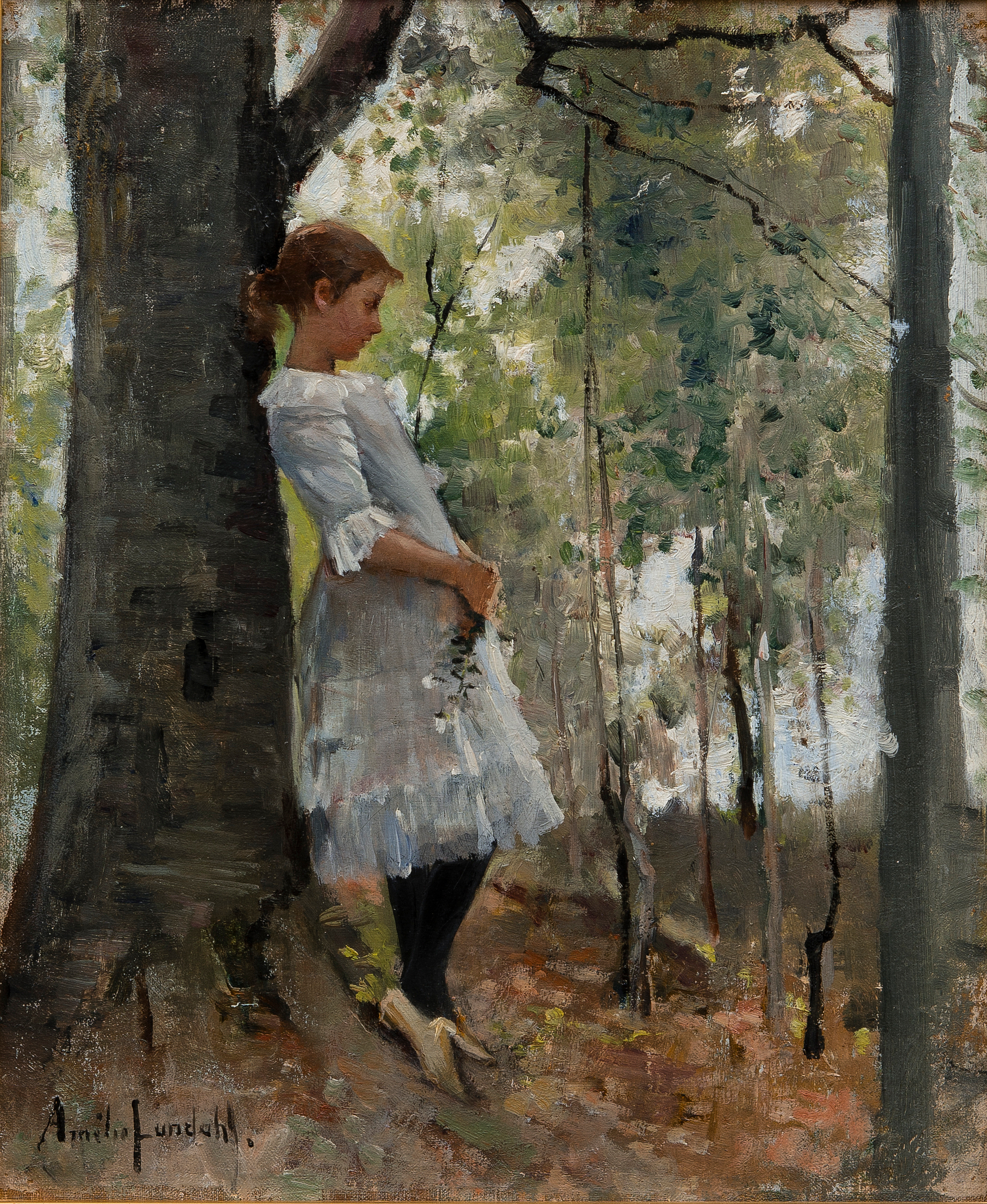
Girl in a Leaf Forest, early 1880s

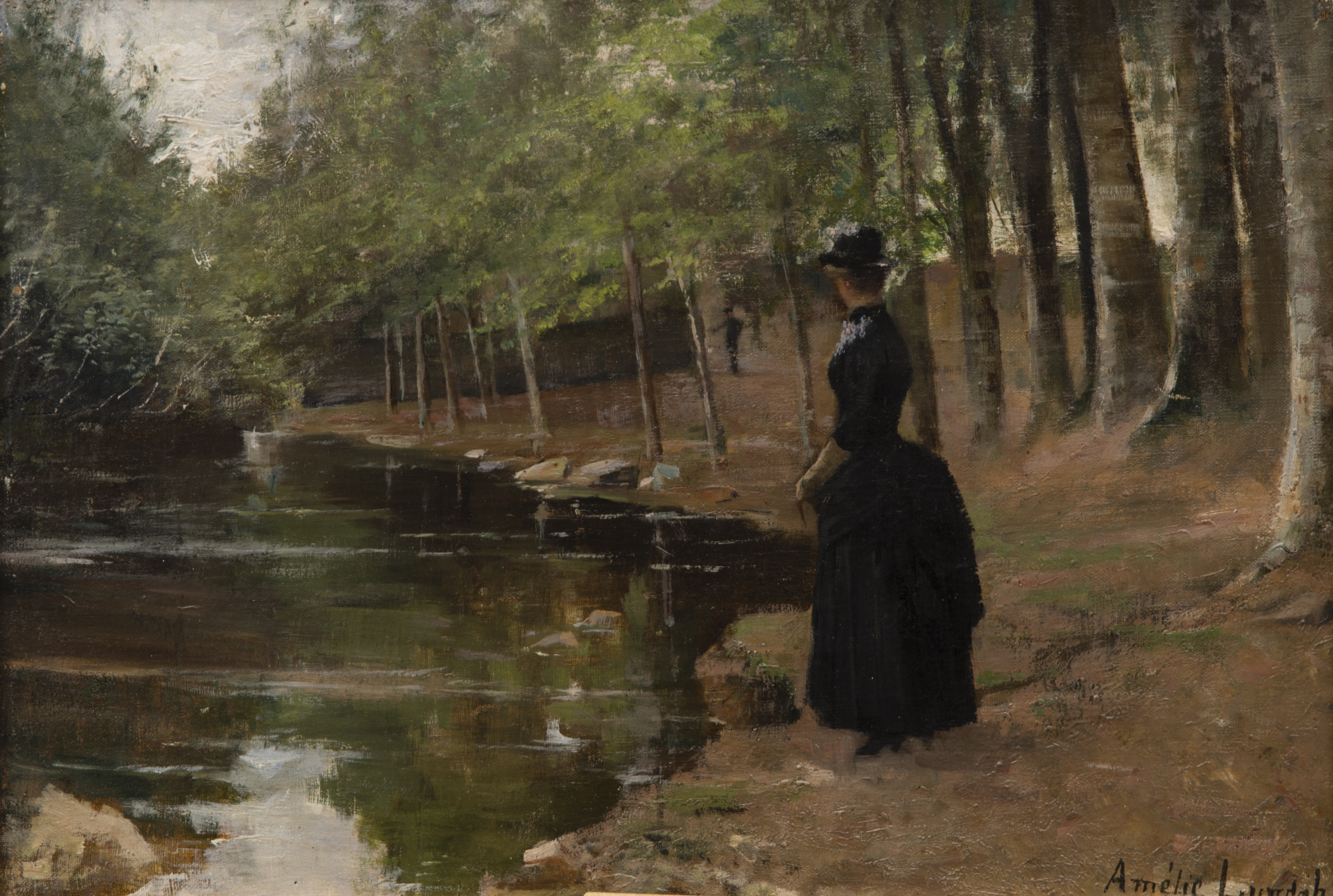
Rendez-vous, 1880s

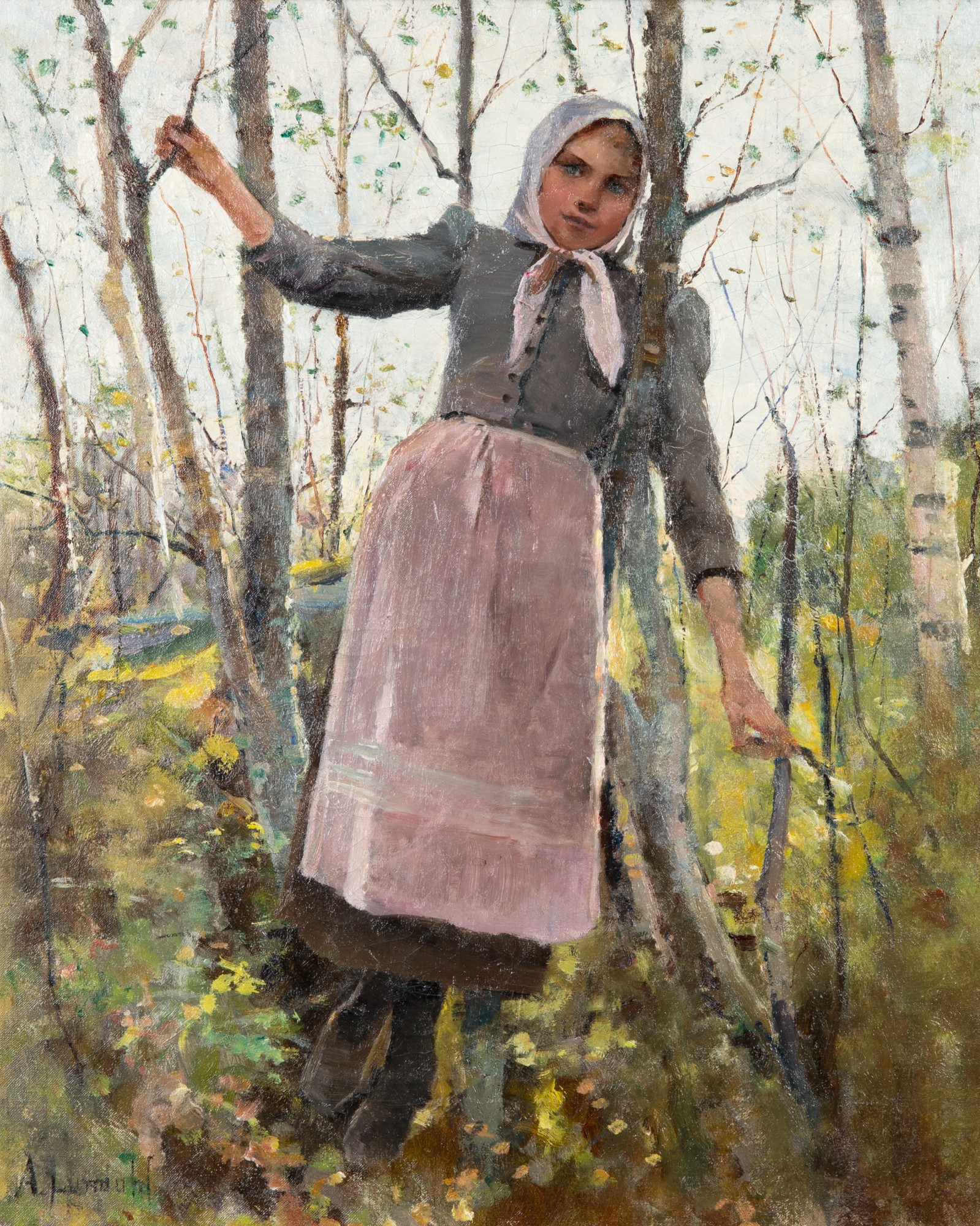
Spring; Girl in a Birch Forest, unknown date

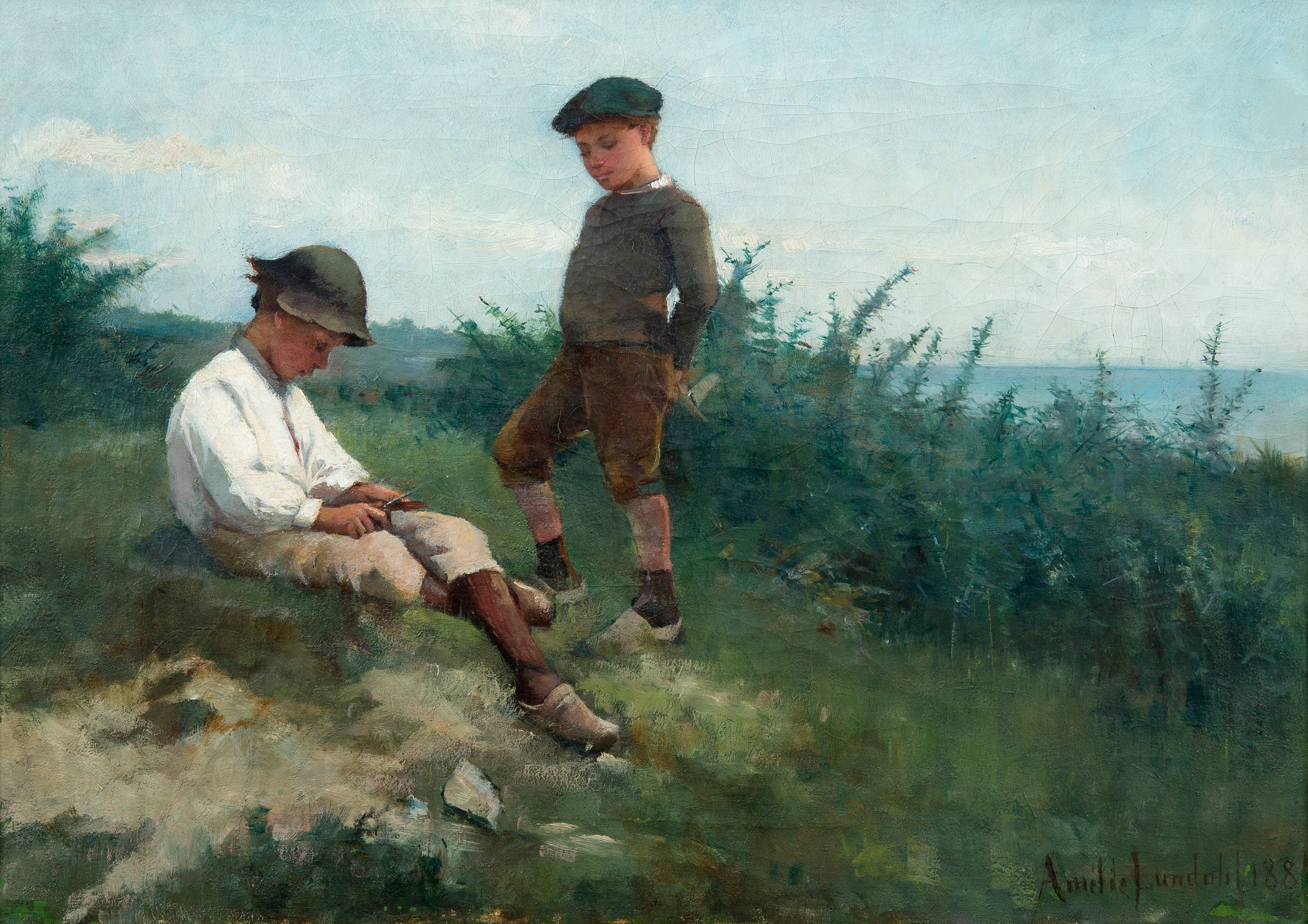
Boys by the Shore, 1881

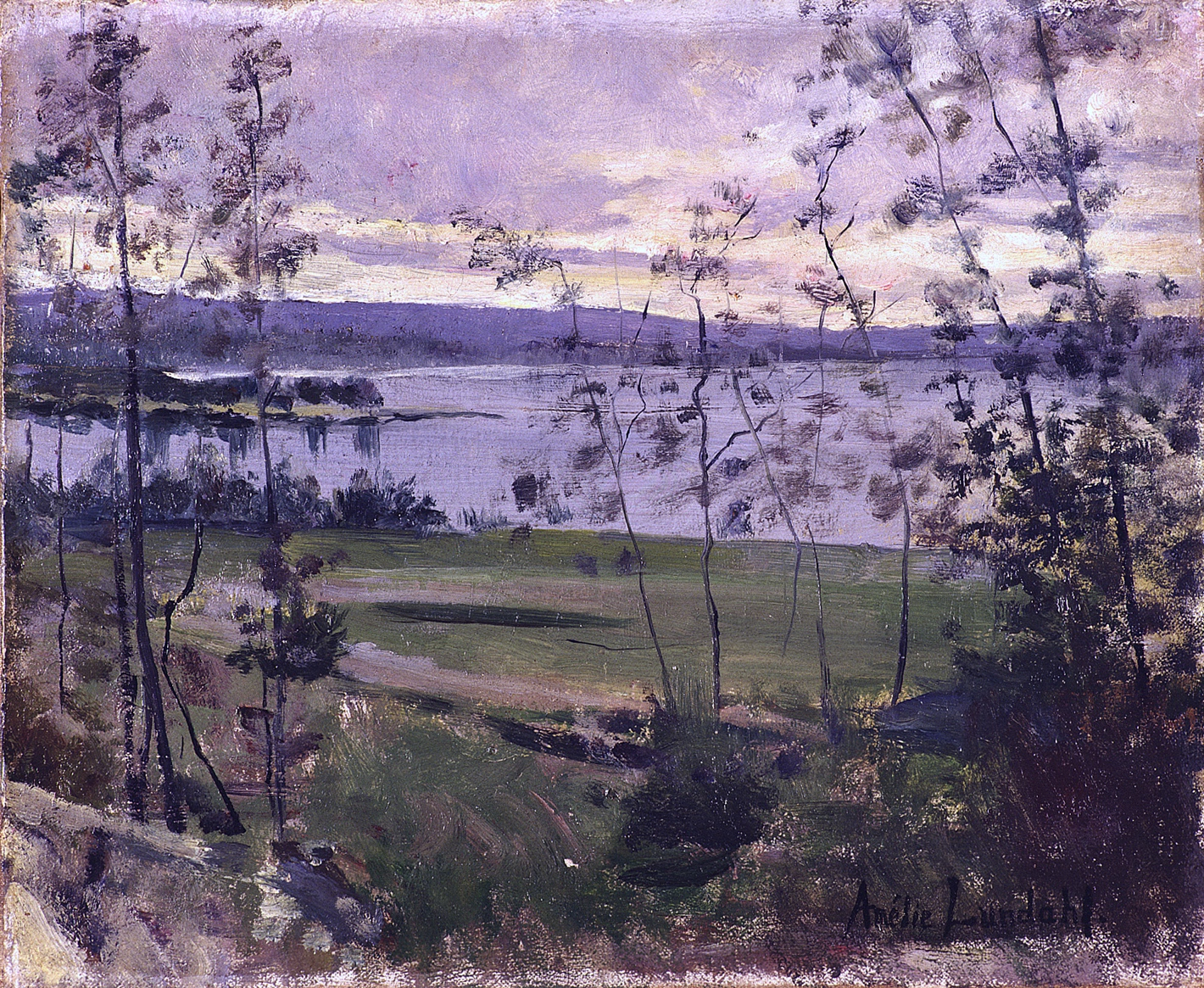
Landscape, 1881

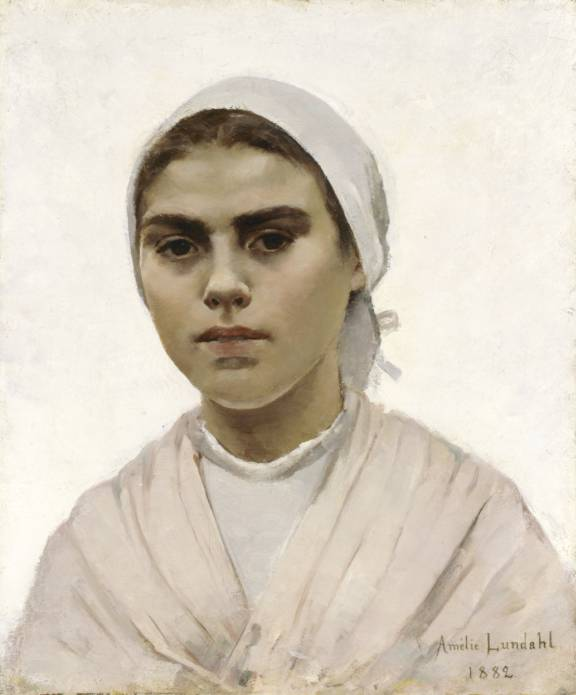
Head of a Girl, Brittany, 1882

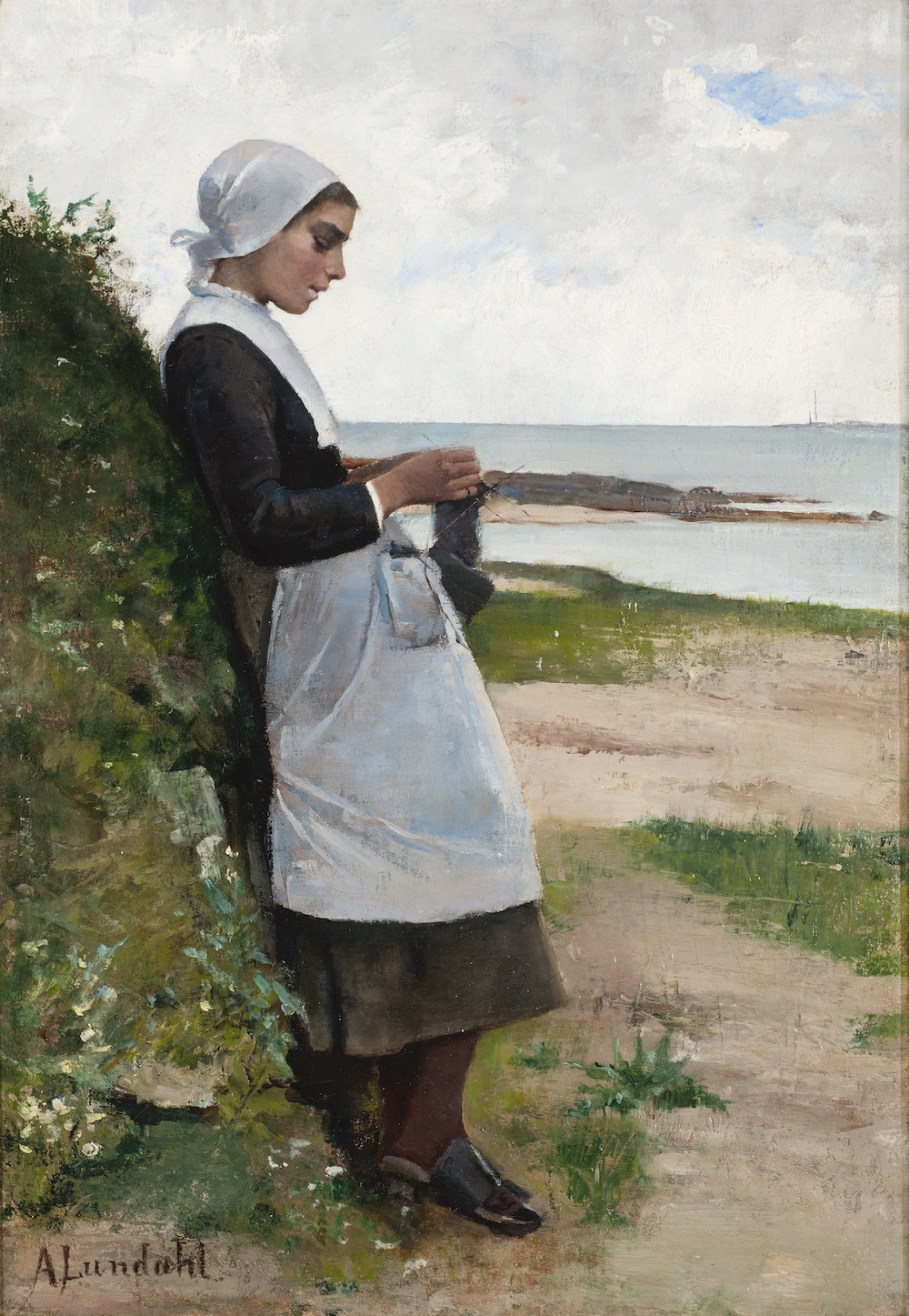
Breton Girl (Sock Knitter), 1883

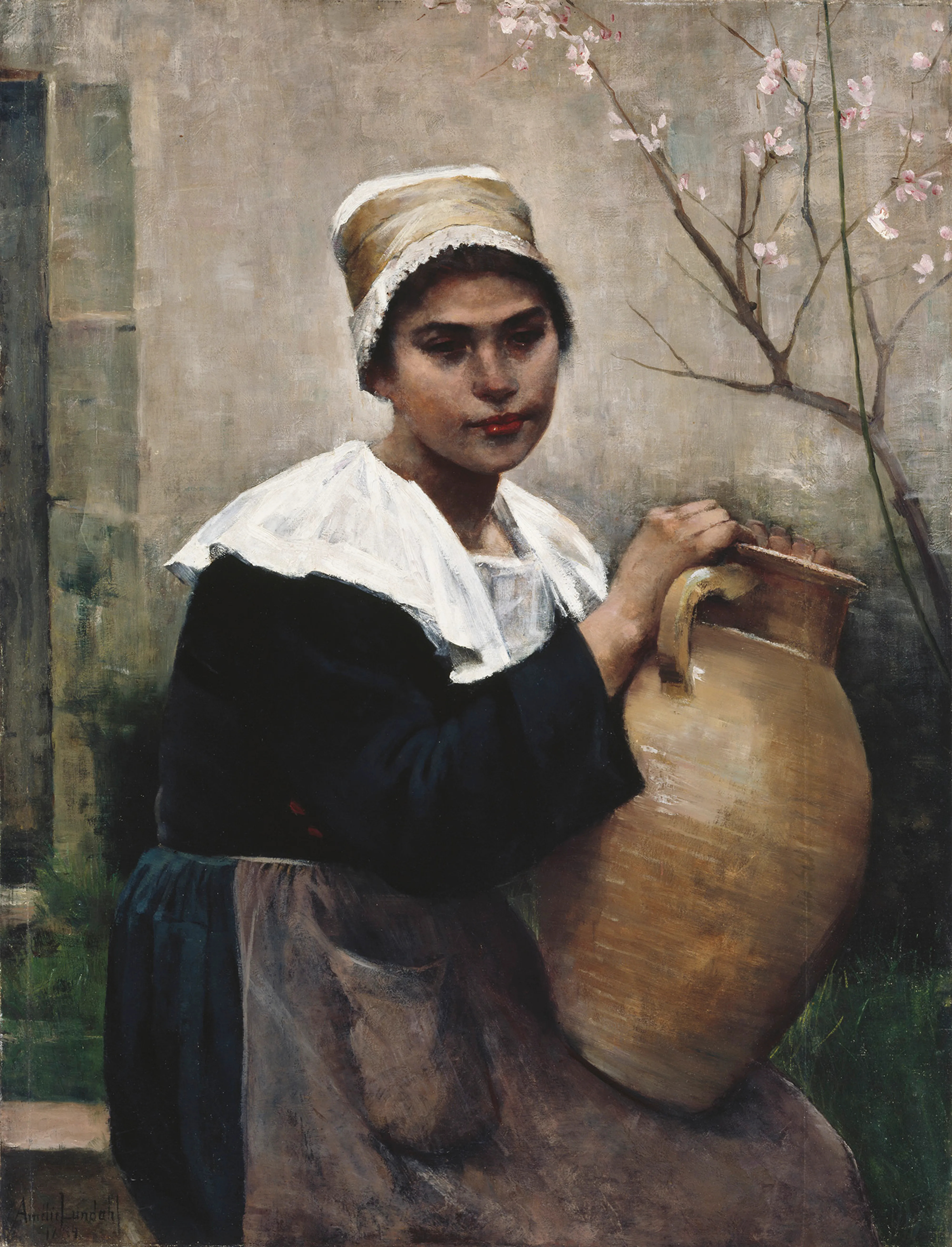
Breton Girl Holding a Jar, 1884

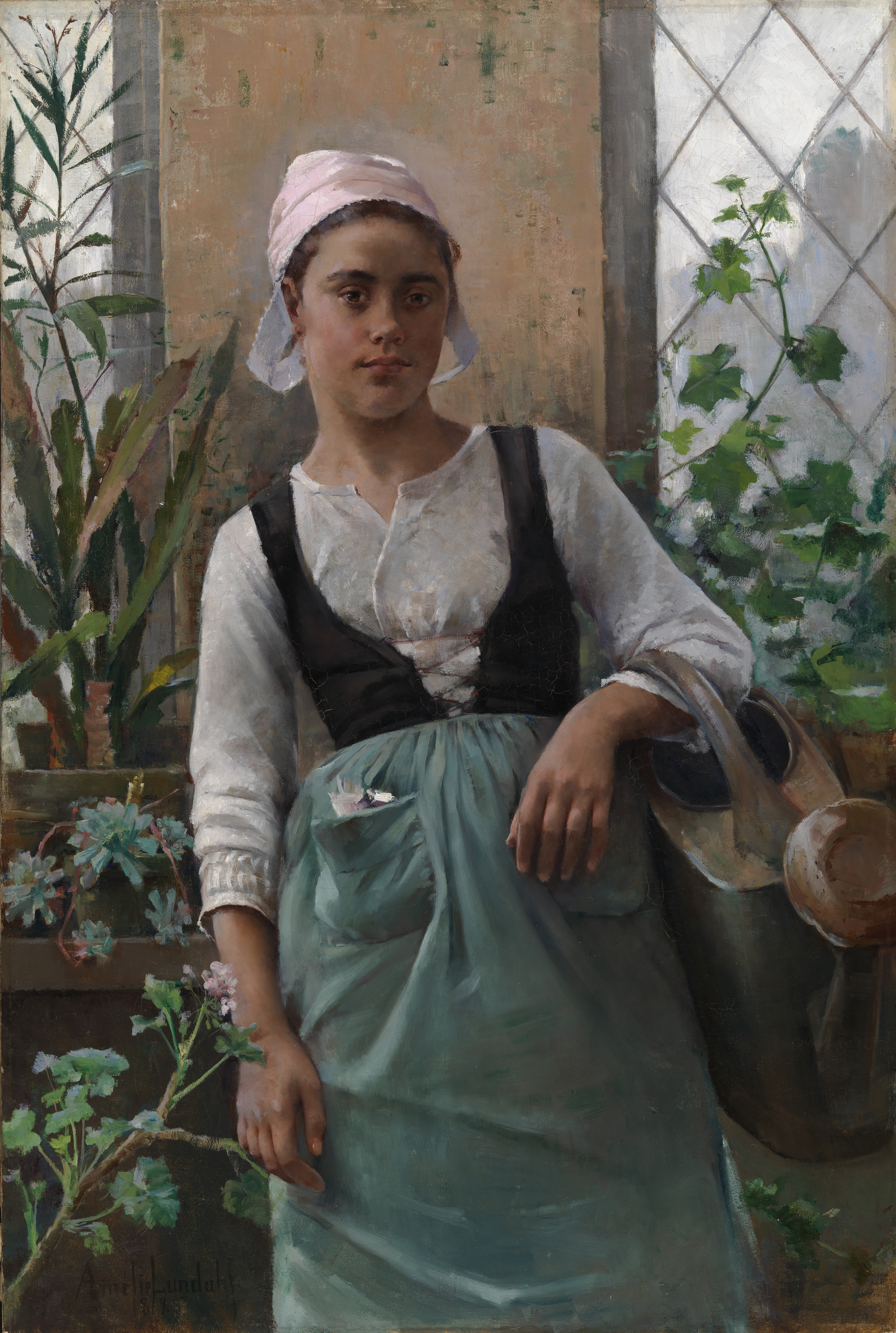
The Garden Girl, 1885

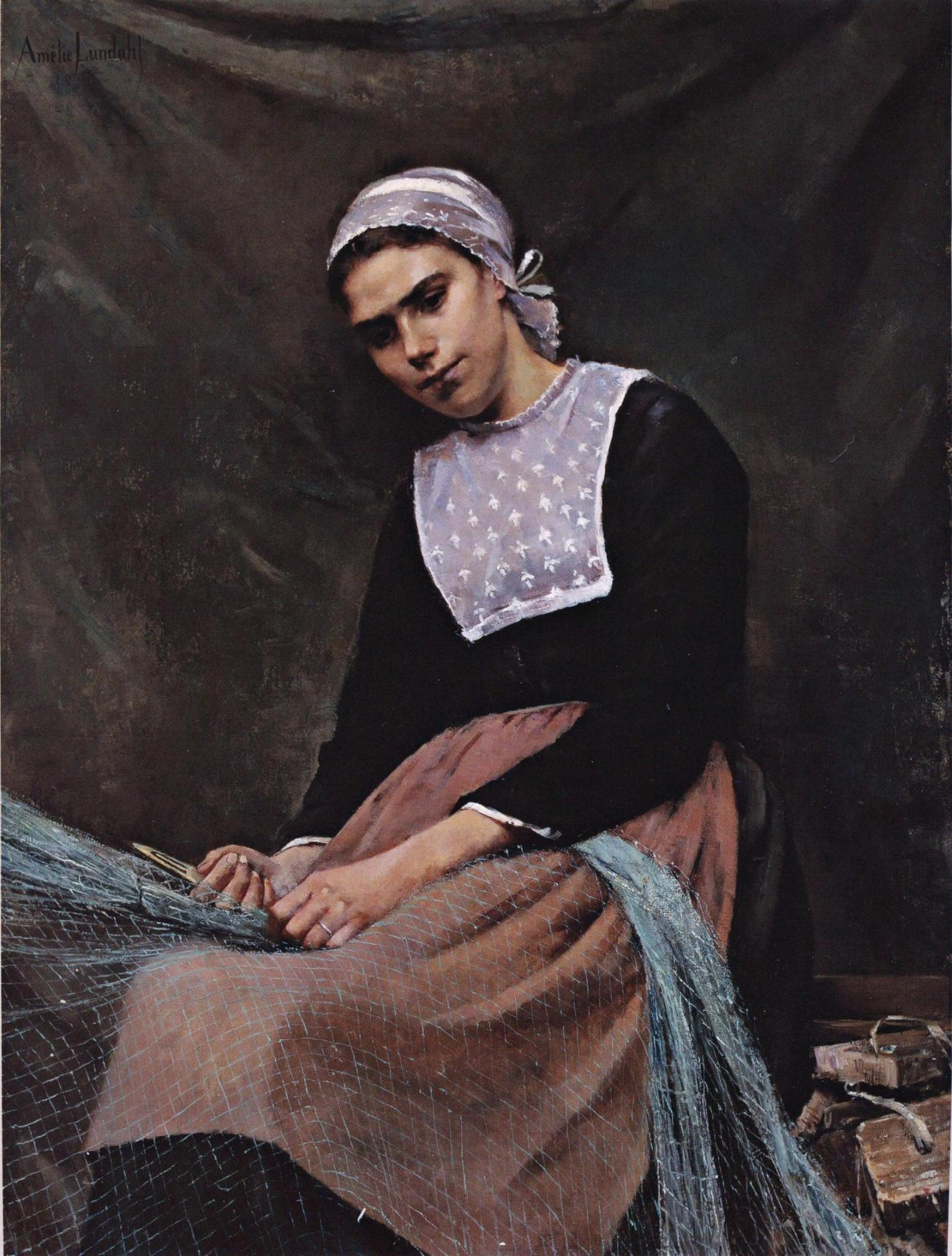
Fisher Girl, 1880s

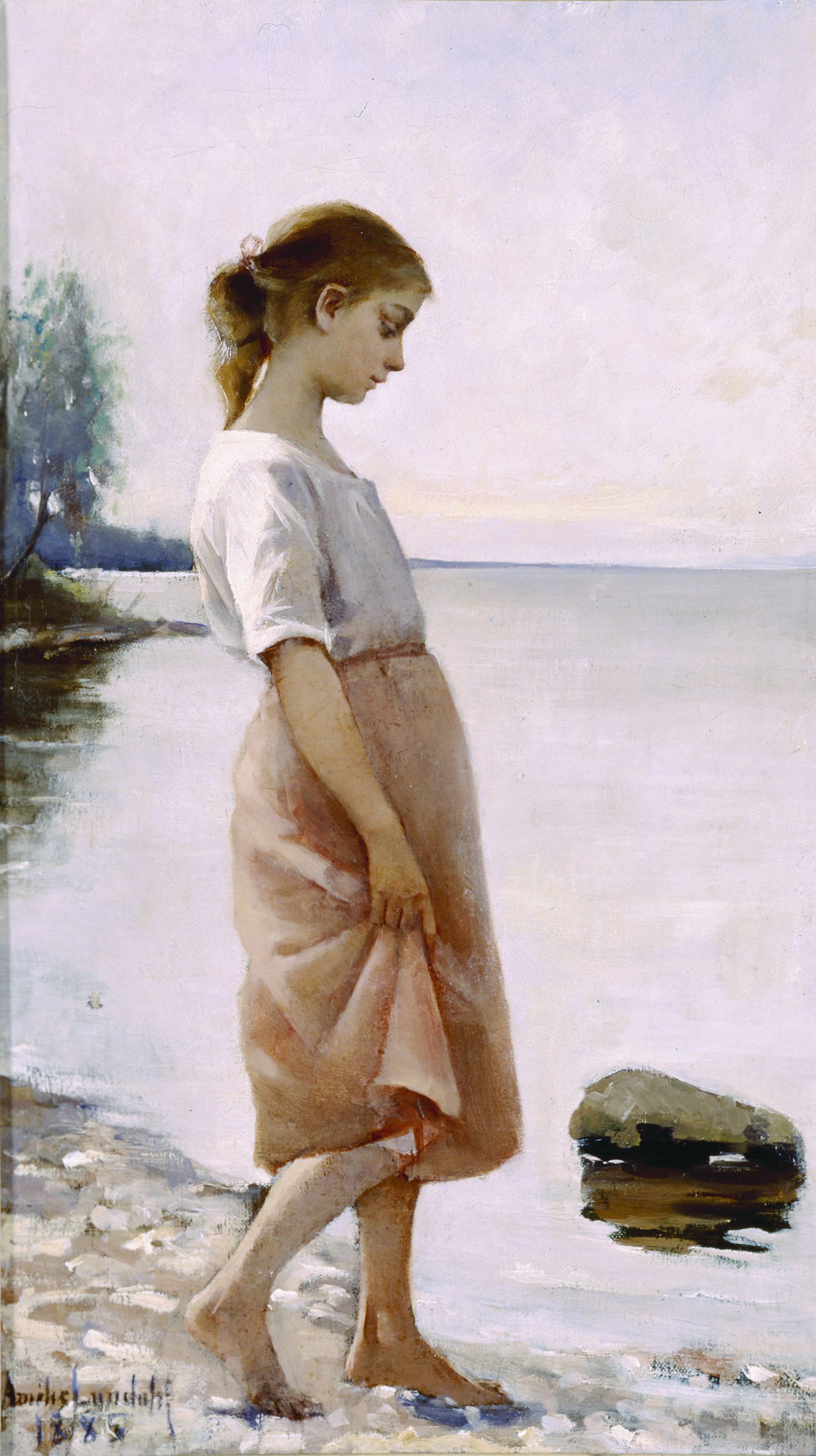
Before a Swim, 1885

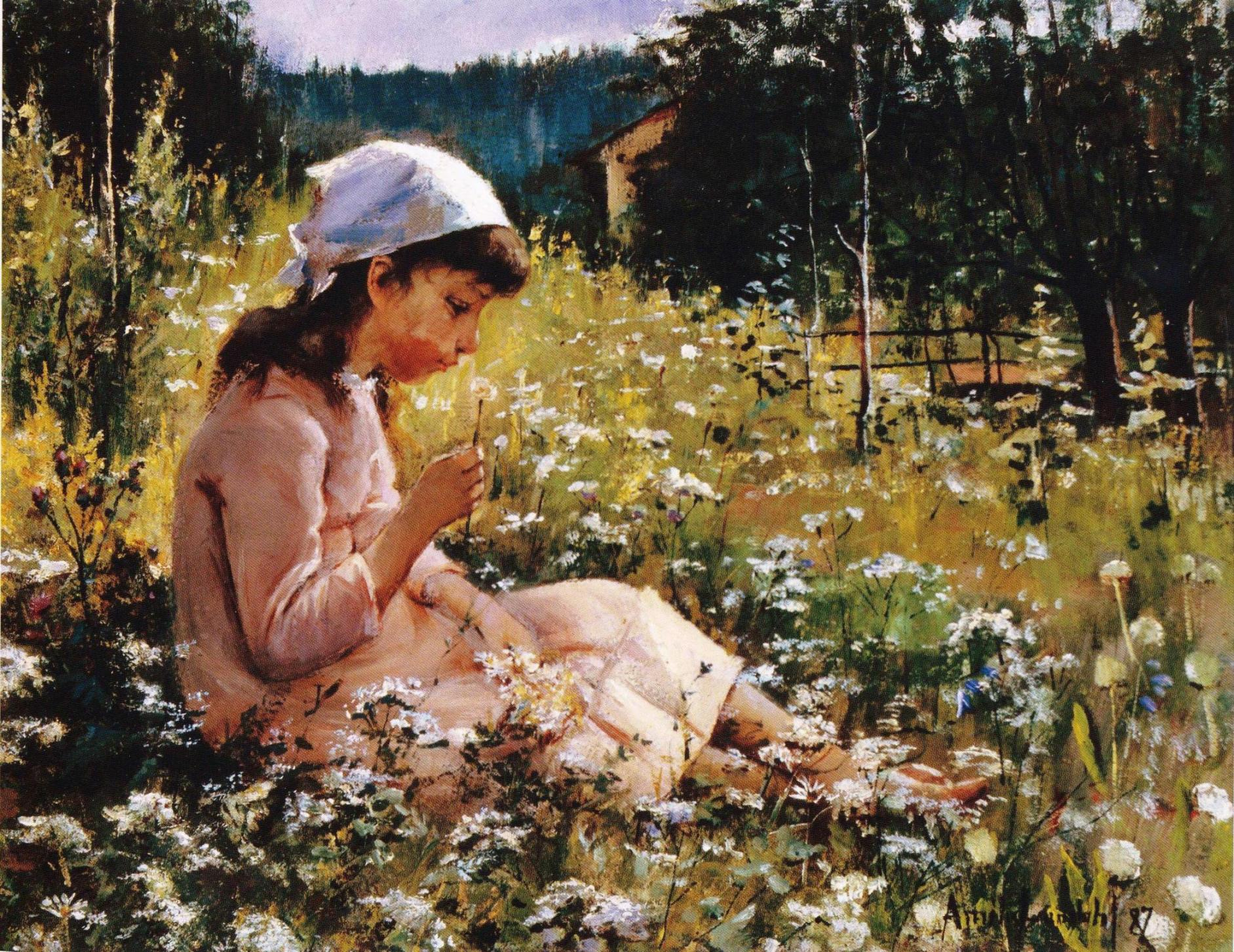
In the Midst of Flowers, 1887

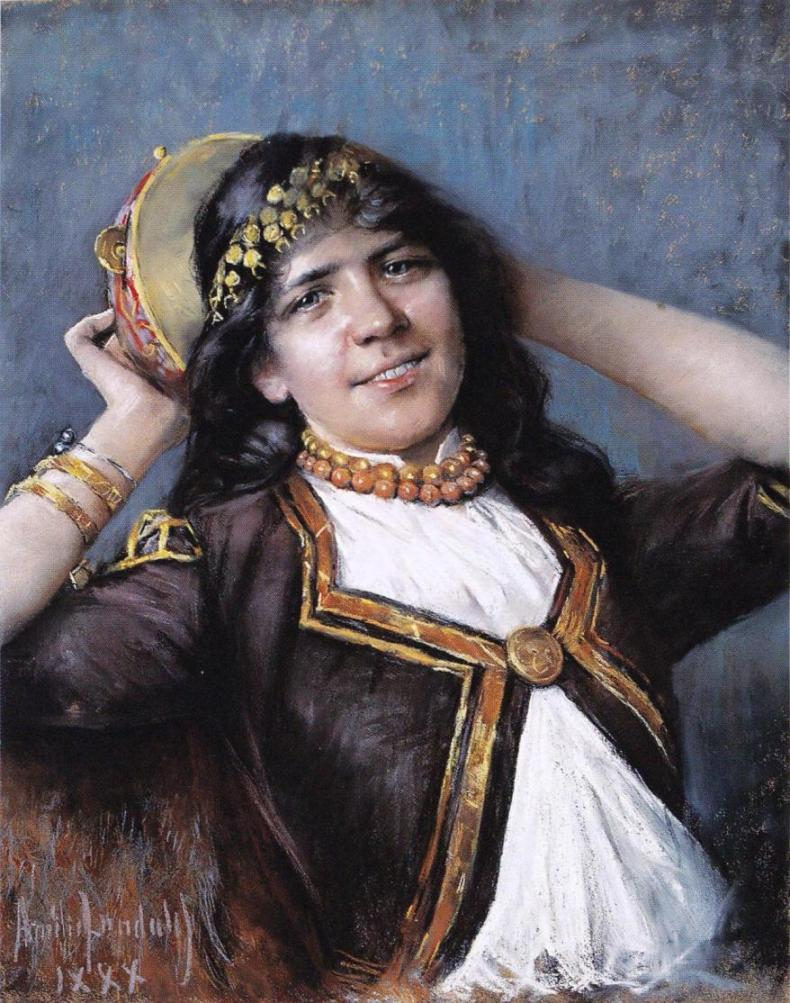
Tambourine Dancer, 1888

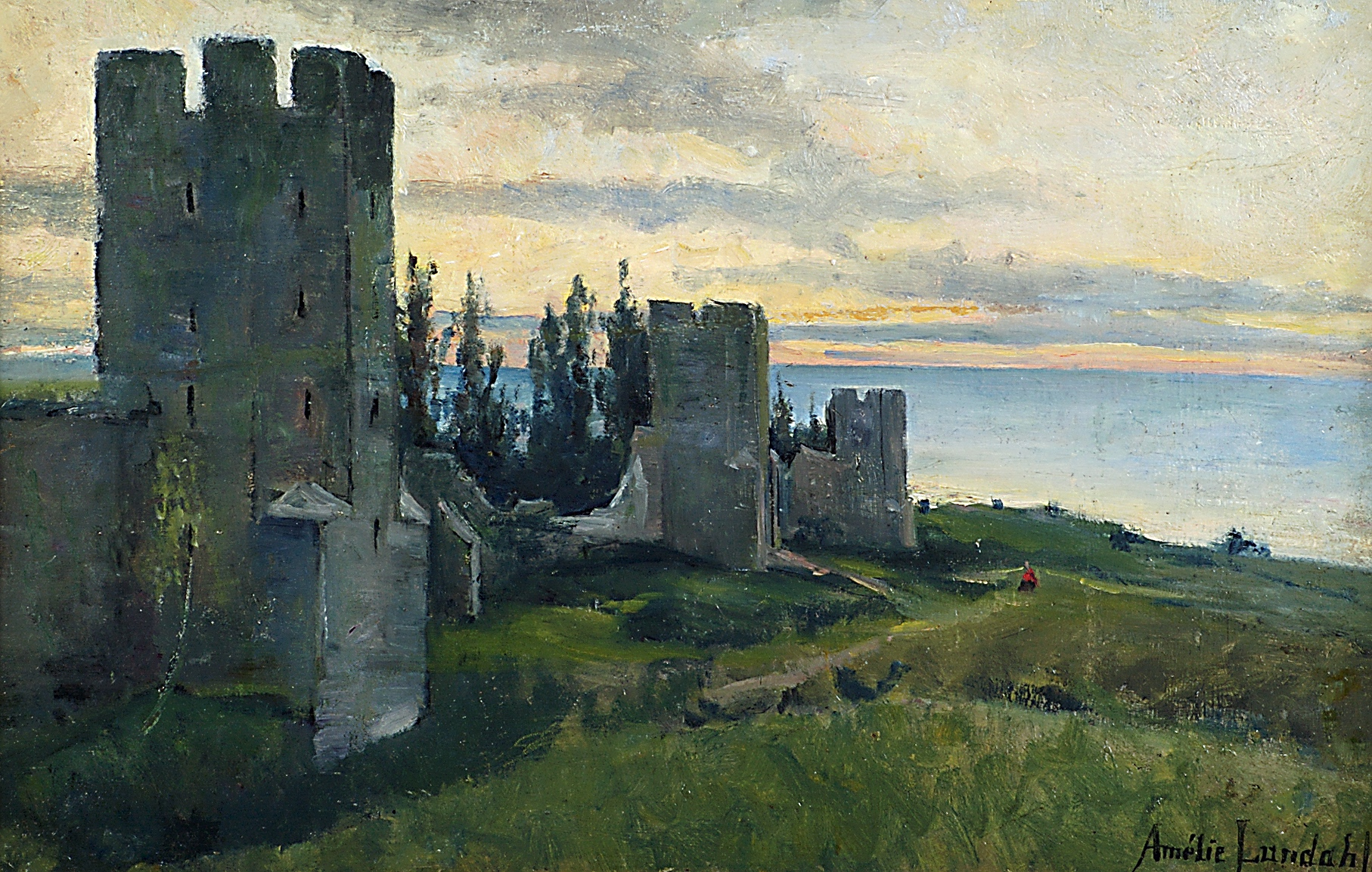
Castle Ruins (Visby City Wall), possibly 1888

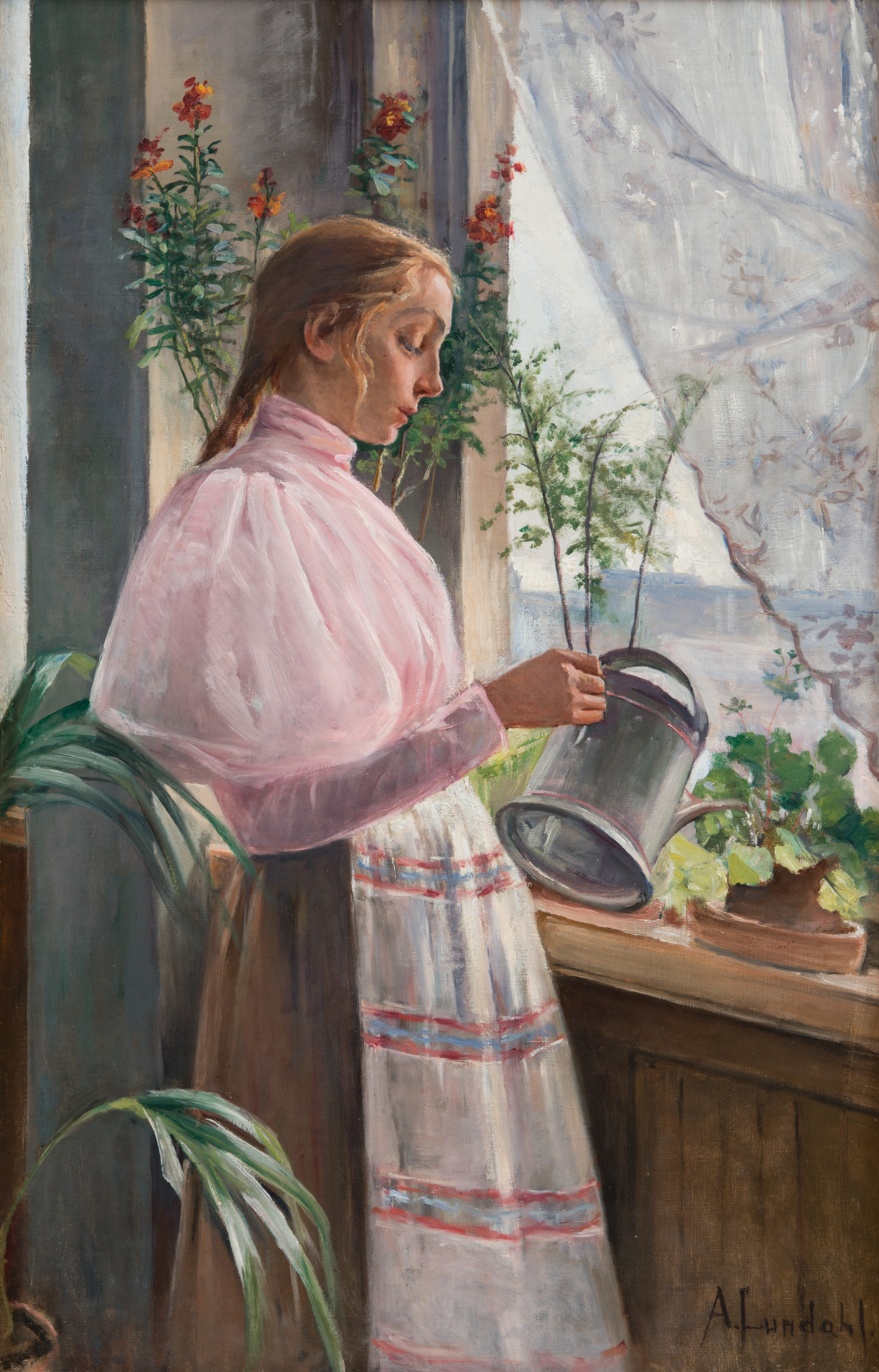
Girl Watering Flowers, possibly early 1890s

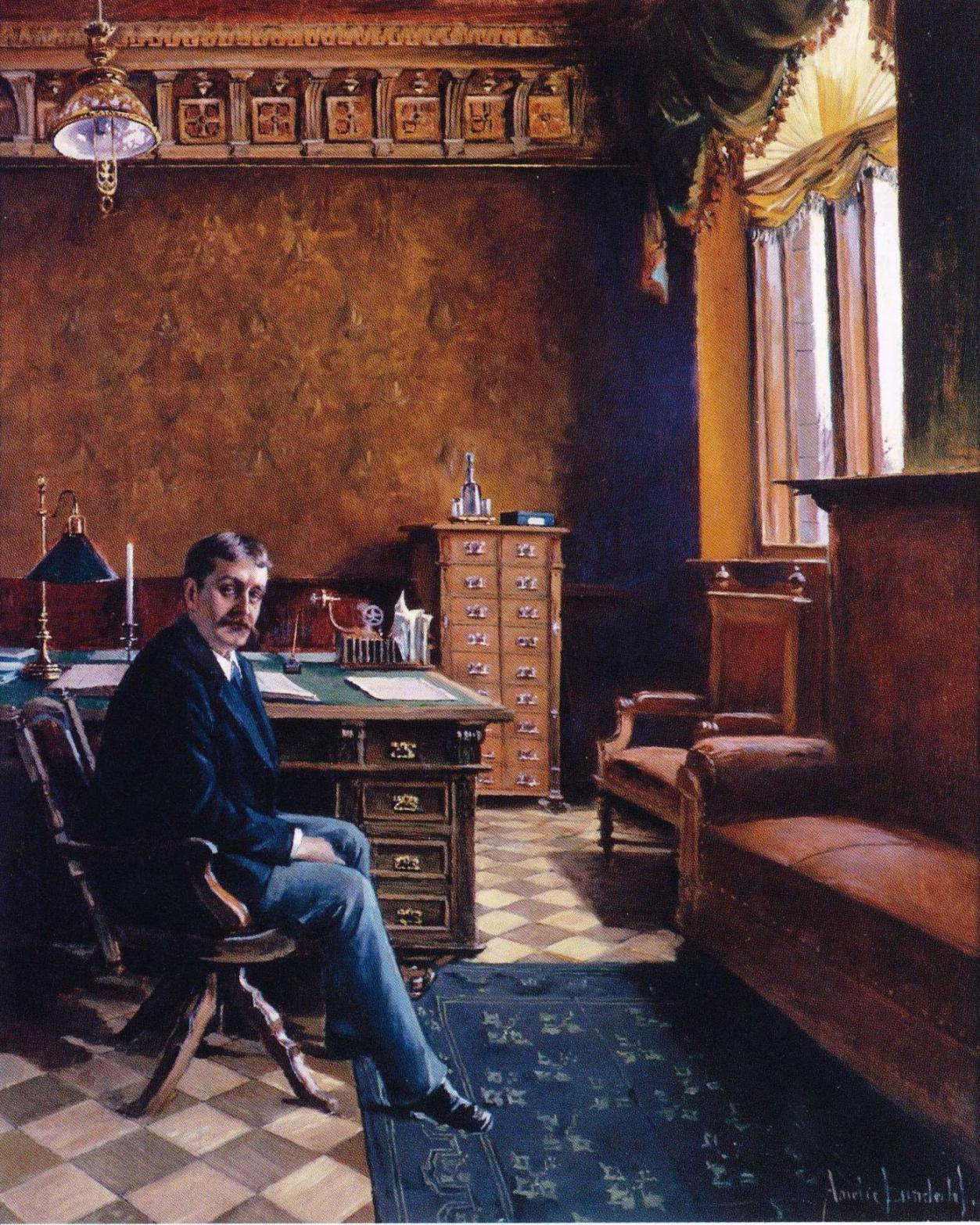
Portrait of Edvin Kaslin, around 1900

== See also ==
- Golden Age of Finnish Art
- Finnish art
