= Amélie (disambiguation) =

Amélie may refer to:

- Amélie (given name)
- Amélie, a 2001 French film
  - Amélie (soundtrack) from the film
  - Amélie (musical), a musical based on the 2001 film
- French frigate Amélie (1808), a 46-gun Pallas-class frigate of the French Navy
- "Amelie", song by Gracie Abrams from Good Riddance
- "Amelie", song by Mercury Rev from The Light in You
- "Amelie", a 2007 song by Mr. J. Medeiros
- Amélie et la métaphysique des tubes, a 2025 French animated film, released in English as Little Amélie or the Character of Rain

== See also ==
- Amelia (disambiguation)
- Amalie (disambiguation)
- Charlotte Amalie, U.S. Virgin Islands, capital of the territory
