= Amélie Linz =

German author (1824–1904)

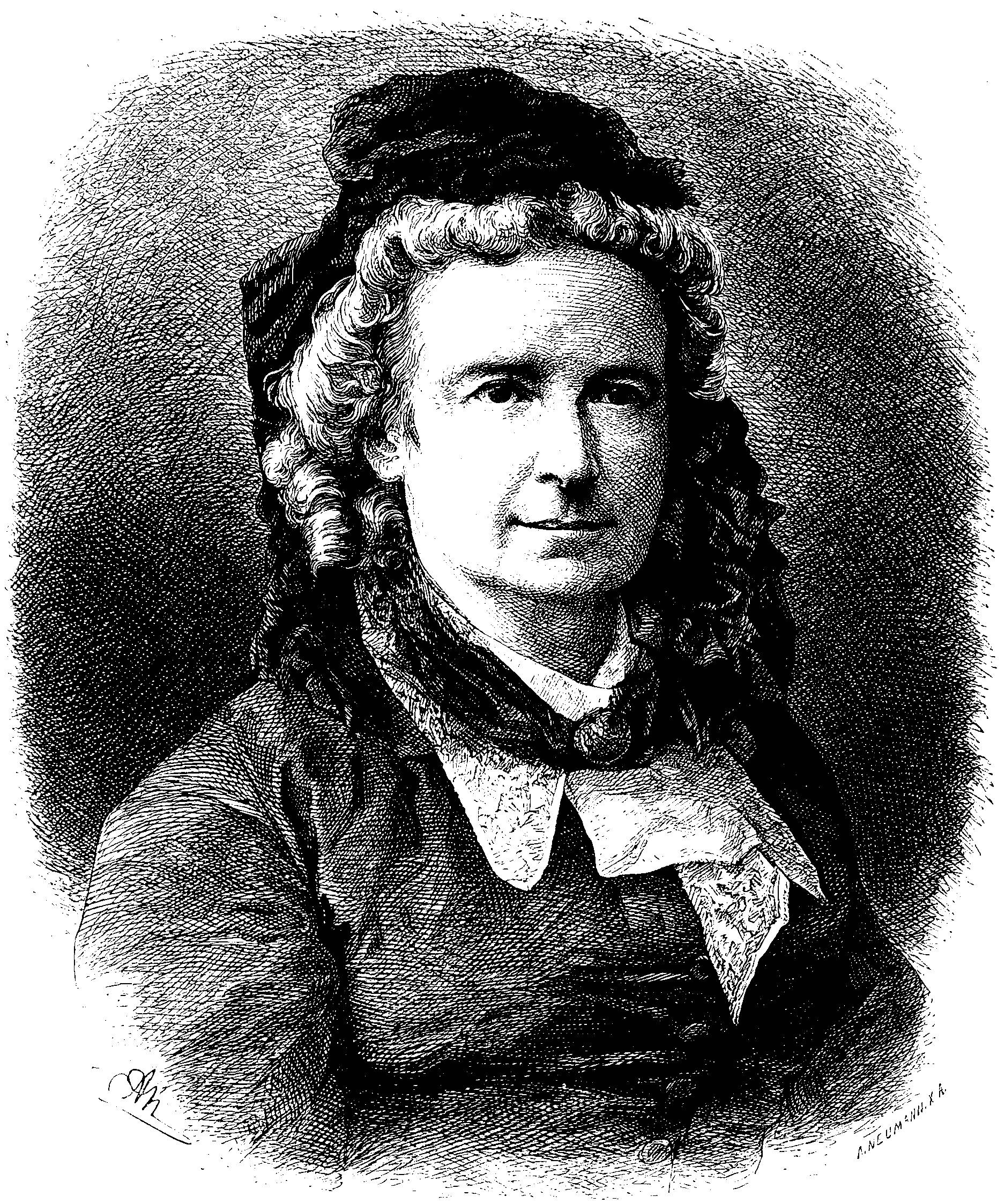
Amélie Linz

Amélie Linz (1824–1904) was a German author who wrote books for children and adults.

== Biography ==
She was born at Bamberg. She married an officer of engineers and four years after his death (1870) settled in Munich. Her literary work, largely under the influence of Paul Heyse, published under the name Amélie Godin, includes the novels Eine Katastrophe (1862), Frauenliebe und Leben.. (1874), Gräfin Lenore (1882), Freudvoll und Leidvoll (1883), Fahre wohl (1886), Mutter und Sohn (1897), and Dora Reval (1901). She wrote collections of fairy tales, such as Märchen von einer Mutter erdacht (fourth edition, 1860), Slavische Märchen (1879), Polnische Volksmärchen (1880), Grosses Märchenbuch (fourth edition, 1886), Märchenkranz, and others.
