= Amalia Kessler =

American lawyer

Amalia D. Kessler is the Lewis Talbot and Nadine Hearn Shelton Professor of International Legal Studies and Professor (by courtesy) of History at Stanford University and is currently serving as the law school's Associate Dean for Advanced Degree Programs. Her research focuses on law, markets, and dispute resolution in France and the United States from the early modern period through to the twentieth century. Among her publications are the award-winning books A Revolution in Commerce: The Parisian Merchant Court and the Rise of Commercial Society in Eighteenth-Century France and Inventing American Exceptionalism: The Origins of American Adversarial Legal Culture, 1800-1877. She is the founding director of the Stanford Center for Law and History and the recipient of several scholarly fellowships and awards, including a Guggenheim Fellowship in 2021. She received her AB from Harvard College, JD from Yale Law School, and MA and PhD from Stanford University.
