= Amalia de la Vega =

Uruguayan singer

Amalia de la Vega (January 19, 1919 – August 25, 2000) was a Uruguayan singer.

== Biography ==
She was born Maria Cecilia Martínez Fernández on January 19, 1919, in Melo, Uruguay. She started her career on radio Radio Carve and Radio El Espectador. She was best known for singing classical and popular music. Accompanied by the unforgettable pianist, Beba Ponce de Leon, she travelled through her native Uruguay, Argentina, Brazil and Chile and often vocalized poems from her favorite poets, Tabaré Regules, Juana de Ibarbourou and Fernán Silva Valdés. She recorded several 78 and 33 rpm records with record labels, such as, Sondor, Antar, Orfeo y Telefunken. She died on August 25, 2000.

== Discography ==
- A mi rancho (Sondor SLP-041)
- Amalia de la Vega (Antar PLP 5029. 1963. Editado como "Señora del folclore" en Argentina por el sello Diapasón GL4030)
- Mate amargo (Antar PLP 5042)
- Amalia de la Vega (EP. Antar FP 33-087)
- El lazo de canciones (Sondor 33016)
- Amalia la nuestra (Orfeo SULP 90589. 1975)
- Mientras fui dichosa (1975)
- Manos ásperas (Orfeo SULP 90589. 1978)
- Colonia del Sacramento (Orfeo SULP 90622)
- Juana de América (Orfeo 90628. 1980)
- Poetas nativistas orientales (Orfeo SCO 90674. 1982)
