= Princess Amalia =

Princess Amalia or Princess Amalie may refer to:

== People ==
- Amalia of Solms-Braunfels (1602–1675), princess consort of Orange
- Princess Amalia of Nassau-Dietz (1710–1777), hereditary princess of Baden-Durlach, wife of Frederick, Hereditary Prince of Baden-Durlach, daughter of John William Friso;
- Anna Amalia, Abbess of Quedlinburg (1723–1787), princess of Prussia, princess-abbess of Quedlinburg, composer and music curator, sister of Frederick the Great;
- Maria Amalia, Duchess of Parma (1746–1804), also duchess of Piacenza and Guastalla, infanta of Spain, born an Archduchess of Austria, Princess of Hungary, Bohemia, and Tuscany, wife of Ferdinand, Duke of Parma, daughter of Maria Theresa;
- Princess Amalie Zephyrine of Salm-Kyrburg (1760–1841), princess of Hohenzollern-Sigmarignen, wife of Anton Aloys, Prince of Hohenzollern-Sigmaringen, daughter of Philip Joseph, Prince of Salm-Kyrburg;
- Princess Amalie of Saxony (1794–1870), composer and dramatist, daughter of Maximilian, Hereditary Prince of Saxony;
- Amalie Auguste of Bavaria (1801–1877), queen consort of Saxony, born a princess of Bavaria, wife of John of Saxony and daughter of Maximilian I Joseph of Bavaria;
- Princess Amalia of Sweden (1805–1853), daughter of Gustav IV Adolf;
- Archduchess Amalie Theresa of Austria (1807), also princess of Hungary and Bohemia, daughter of Francis II, Holy Roman Emperor;
- Princess Amalia of Saxe-Weimar-Eisenach (1830–1872), princess of the Netherlands, wife of Prince Henry of the Netherlands, daughter of Prince Bernhard of Saxe-Weimat-Eisenach;
- Amélie of Leuchtenberg (1812–1873), empress consort of Brazil, born a princess of Leuchtenberg, wife of Pedro I of Brazil, daughter of Eugène de Beauharnais;
- Princess Amalie of Hohenzollern-Sigmaringen (1815–1841), princess of Saxe-Altenburg, wife of Prince Eduard of Saxe-Altenburg, daughter of Karl, Prince of Hohenzoller-Sigmaringen;
- Princess Amalie of Saxe-Coburg and Gotha (1848–1894), duchess in Bavaria, wife of Duke Maximilian Emanuel in Bavaria, daughter of Prince August of Saxe-Coburg and Gotha;
- Amélie of Orléans (1865–1951), queen consort of Portugal, born a princess of Orléans, wife of Carlos I of Portugal, daughter of Prince Philippe, Count of Paris;
- Catharina-Amalia, Princess of Orange (born 2003), princess of the Netherlands, heir apparent to the Dutch throne.

== Other ==
- SS Prinses Amalia, a Dutch steam ship built for the Netherland Line
- Princess Amalia Wind Farm, an offshore wind farm in the Netherlands
- Princess Amalia Sheran Sharm, a character from the French animated series Wakfu
- Princess Amalia Flickerfoot, a character from The Unicorn Chronicles by Bruce Coville

== See also ==
- Amalia (given name)
- Princess Amelia (disambiguation)
