= Amalia Miranzo =

Spanish politician

- Born: 31 October 1939; Cuenca, Spain
- Died: 20 June 2014 (aged 74)
- Occupation: Politician
- Political party: Spanish Socialist Workers' Party

Amalia Miranzo Martínez (31 October 1939 – 20 June 2014) was a Spanish politician from the Spanish Socialist Workers' Party. In 1977 she was elected as member of the Senate Constituent Cortes, being the only female Socialist politician to do so. She also served as member of the Senate of Spain in its two first legislatures (1979–1986).
