= Amélie Belin =

French painter

Amélie Belin was a French painter and pastellist active during the 18th century. From Toulouse, she studied in that city with Bonnemaison and Jacquemin, and in 1787 was awarded the prix de la peinture for her work. That same year, she exhibited a number of portraits in pastel at the Salon de Toulouse.
