= Uraiújfalu =

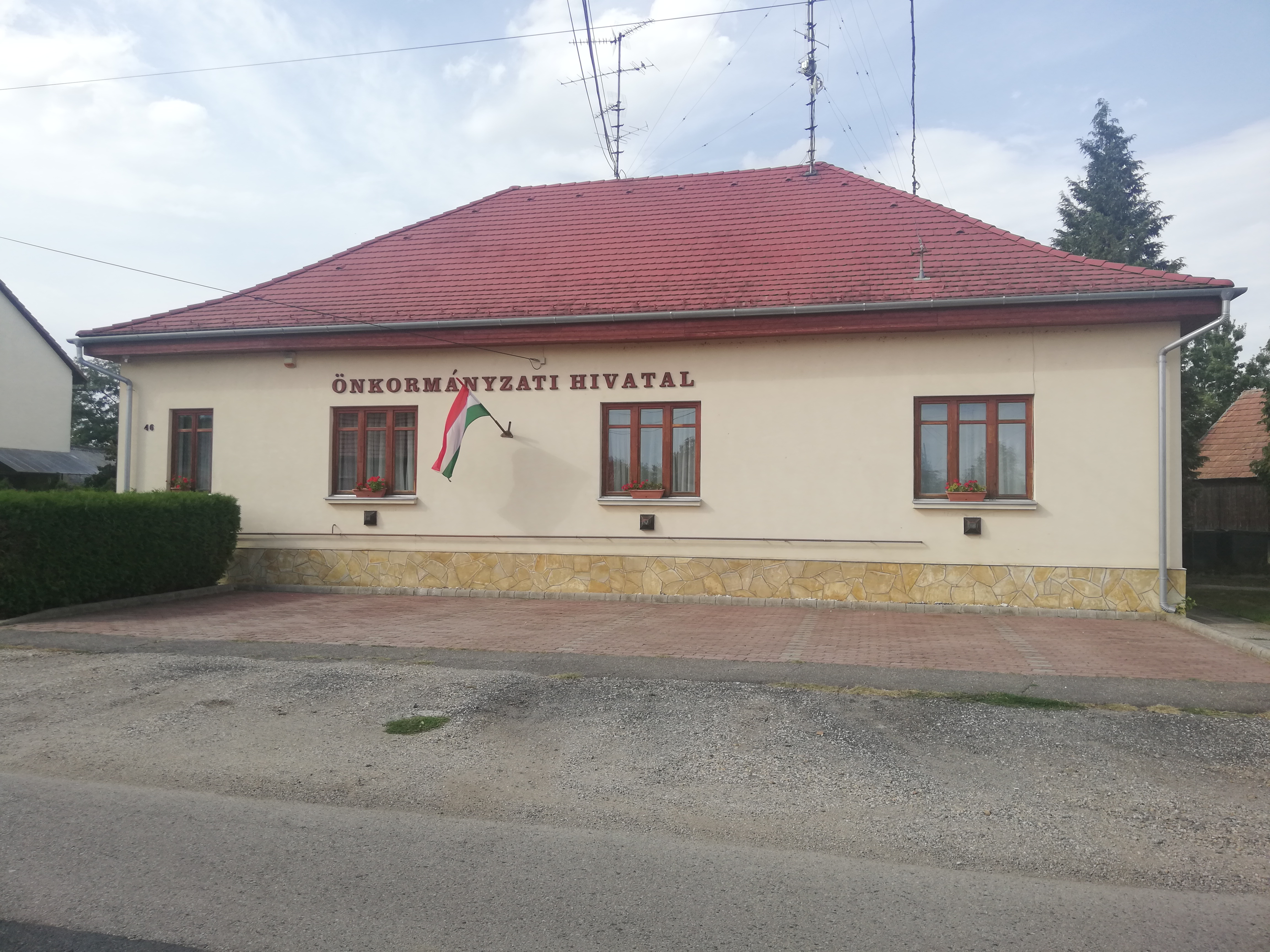
- Village hall

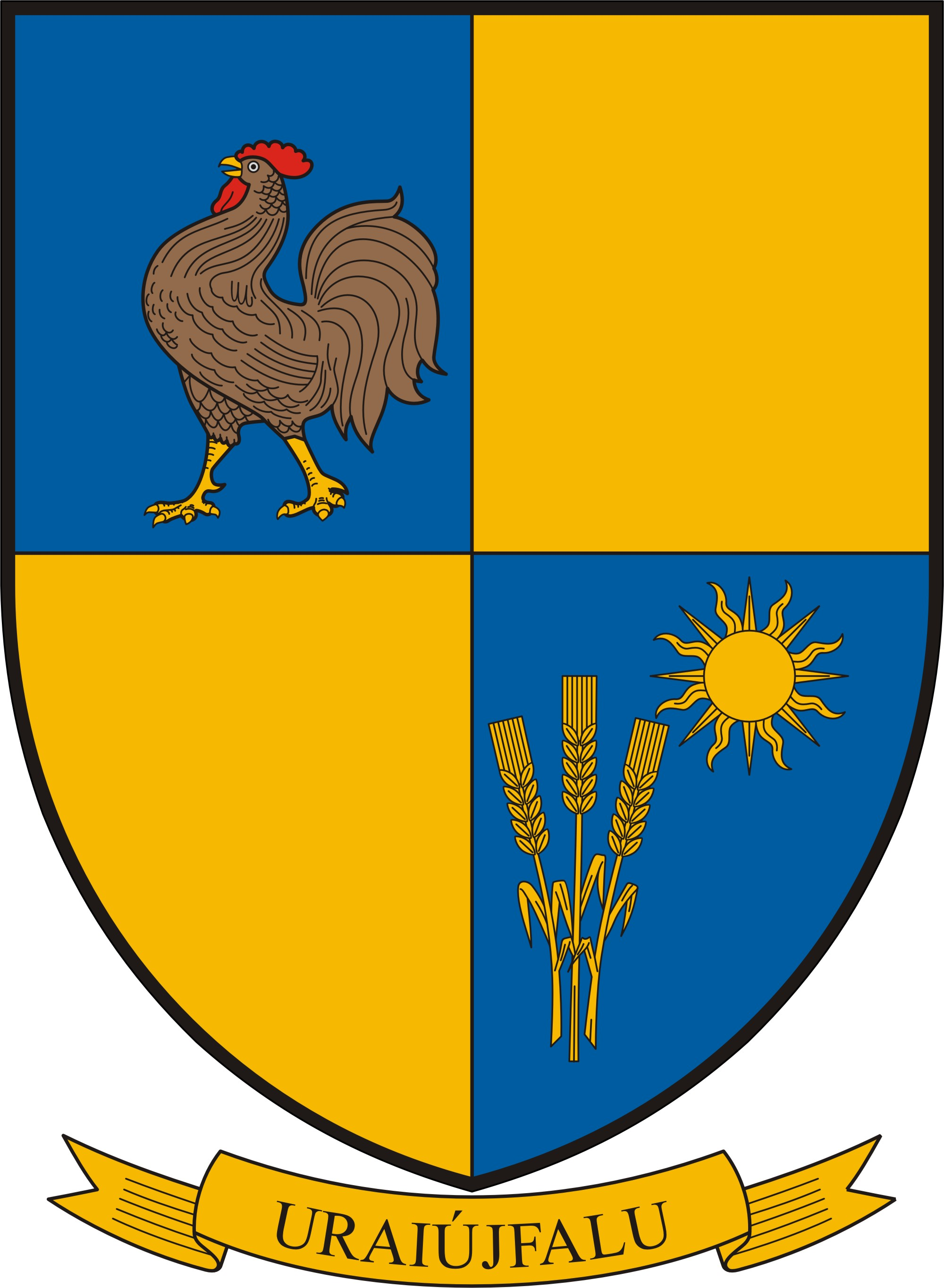
- Coat of arms

- Location of Uraiújfalu in Hungary
- Coordinates: 47.37219°N 16.98544°E
- Country: Hungary
- Region: Western Transdanubia
- County: Vas
- Subregion: Sárvári
- Rank: Village

Area
  - Total: 19.08 km^{2} (7.37 sq mi)

Population (1 January 2008)
  - Total: 890
  - Density: 47/km^{2} (120/sq mi)
- Time zone: UTC+1 (CET)
  - Summer (DST): UTC+2 (CEST)
- Postal code: 9651
- Area code: +36 95
- KSH code: 21537
- Website: https://uraiujfalu.hu/

Uraiújfalu is a village in Vas county, Hungary.
