= Amalie Malling =

Amalie Malling (born 1948, Lübeck) is a Danish classical pianist.

== Life ==
She studied under Herman David Koppel and then at the Hanover conservatoire and regularly worked with Alfred Brendel. She then moved to Denmark in 1961, where she won the first prize in the Scandinavian Piano Competition, then gave a series of recitals and concerts. Moving towards contemporary music, she performed several pieces dedicated to her by Danish composers. In 1981 she became a professor at the Royal Danish Academy of Music.

== Discography ==
- 1980 Mozart, Jersild, etc. (LP, Paula - 5)
- 1991 Heise chamber music (with Morten Zeuthen, etc.) (Dacapo - DCCD 9113)
- 1994 Abrahamsen, Ruders, Nielsen, Gade (Dacapo - 8.224019)
- 1995 Robert Schumann: Piano Works Op. 6 and Op. 20 (Kontrapunkt - 32201)
- 1998 Otto Malling: Piano concerto and Piano Trio (with DR-RadioUnderholdningsorkestret) (Dacapo - 8.224114
- 2002 Rovsing Olsen: Music for cello and piano (with Morten Zeuthen) (Dacapo - 8.224222)
- 2005 Beethoven: Sonatas for cello and piano (with Morten Zeuthen) (Classico - CLASSCD660-61)
- 2006 Mozart: Piano Works (Classico - 650)
