= Winter (surname) =

Winter is a surname.

== Geographical distribution ==
As of 2014, 40.7% of all known bearers of the surname Winter were residents of Germany (frequency 1:992), 22.9% of the United States (1:7,932), 9.5% of England (1:2,952), 4.4% of Austria (1:974), 3.9% of Australia (1:3,034), 3.4% of Brazil (1:30,666), 3.0% of Canada (1:6,132), 1.7% of the Netherlands (1:4,879), 1.4% of South Africa (1:20,013) and 1.3% of France (1:26,529).

In Austria, the frequency of the surname was higher than the national average (1:974) in the following states:

1. Lower Austria (1:671)
2. Salzburg (1:798)
3. Vienna (1:802)
4. Styria (1:848)

In Germany, the frequency of the surname was higher than the national average (1:992) in the following states:

1. Bremen (1:674)
2. Mecklenburg-Vorpommern (1:695)
3. Hesse (1:719)
4. Saxony-Anhalt (1:737)
5. Saarland (1:831)
6. Saxony (1:839)
7. Bavaria (1:887)
8. Brandenburg (1:895)
9. Thuringia (1:910)
10. Lower Saxony (1:977)

In England, the frequency of the surname was higher than the national average (1:2,952) in the following counties:

1. East Sussex (1:1,284)
2. County Durham (1:1,291)
3. Isle of Wight (1:1,470)
4. Cumbria (1:1,521)
5. Northumberland (1:1,597)
6. East Riding of Yorkshire (1:1,637)
7. Tyne and Wear (1:1,638)
8. Somerset (1:1,698)
9. Bristol (1:1,766)
10. Lincolnshire (1:1,864)
11. Hampshire (1:2,018)
12. Dorset (1:2,102)
13. Norfolk (1:2,143)
14. Surrey (1:2,150)
15. Rutland (1:2,232)
16. Kent (1:2,259)
17. Hertfordshire (1:2,270)
18. Gloucestershire (1:2,288)
19. Cambridgeshire (1:2,464)
20. Bedfordshire (1:2,476)
21. Wiltshire (1:2,581)
22. Buckinghamshire (1:2,592)
23. Berkshire (1:2,593)
24. Devon (1:2,596)
25. South Yorkshire (1:2,780)
26. West Sussex (1:2,835)
27. North Yorkshire (1:2,910)
28. Nottinghamshire (1:2,922)

== Disambiguation pages ==
- Edward Winter (disambiguation), multiple people
- John Winter (disambiguation), multiple people
- Michael Winter (disambiguation), multiple people
- Ralph Winter (disambiguation), multiple people
- Robert Winter (disambiguation), multiple people
- William Winter (disambiguation), multiple people

== Arts and entertainment ==
- Agnes-Nicole Winter (born 1956), Swedish television personality
- Alex Winter (born 1965), British-American actor and director
- Amalie Winter (1802–1879), poet and novelist
- Andrew Winter (1893–1958), American artist
- Andy Winter, British comics writer
- Ariel Winter (born 1998), American actress and voice actress
- Cameron Winter (born 2002), American singer and songwriter
- Carl Winter (art historian) (1906–1966), British art historian and museum curator
- Chelsea Winter, New Zealand celebrity chef, entrepreneur, food writer, and television personality
- Claude Winter (1931–2011), actress
- Cris Winter, radio personality
- Damon Winter (born 1974), New York-based photographer
- David Alexandre Winter (born 1943), Dutch-born pop singer
- Donovan Winter (?–2015), British film director, actor, and writer
- Dorothea Winter (1949–2012), German recorder player and recorder teacher
- Edgar Winter (born 1946), American musician
- Eric Winter (born 1976), American actor
- Ethel Winter (1924–2012), American dancer and dance instructor
- Ezra Winter (1886–1949), prominent American muralist
- Faith Winter (artist) (1927–2017), British sculptor
- Faye Winter (born 1995), English television personality
- Fritz Winter (1905–1976), German painter
- Glen Winter, Canadian television director, cinematographer, and producer
- Guilherme Winter (born 1979), Brazilian actor
- H. Edward Winter (1908–1976), American enamel artist
- Harald Winter (born 1953), artist
- Harry Winter (1914–2001), German-Austrian singer, musician, and band director
- Harry A. Winter (1889–1969), lawyer, journalist, judge, and political figure
- Jens Winter (born 1965), German film and theatre actor of British descent
- Johnny Winter (1944–2014), American singer, songwriter, musician
- Judy Winter (born 1944), German actress
- Julia Winter (born 1993), Swedish-British actress
- Katia Winter (born 1983), Swedish actress
- Kurt Winter (1946–1997), Canadian guitarist
- Laska Winter (1905–1980), American actress
- Ophélie Winter (born 1974), French singer and actress
- Paul Winter (born 1939), American musician
- Pedro Winter (born 1975), French record producer, DJ, and record label owner
- Peter Winter (1754–1825), German dramatic composer
- Ralph Winter (producer) (born 1952), American film producer
- Ronnie Winter, lead singer of The Red Jumpsuit Apparatus
- Samira Winter (born 1991), singer in the pop band Winter
- Sarah Winter (born 1993), British film and television actress
- Terence Winter (born 1960), Emmy Award-winning American screenwriter and television producer
- Thelma Frazier Winter (1908–1977), American ceramist
- Veronika Winter (born 1965), German soprano
- Vincent Winter (1947–1998), Scottish child actor

== Business ==
- Benjamin Winter, Sr. (1882–1944), American real estate developer
- Edwin Winter (1845–?), president of Northern Pacific Railway
- Eirik Winter, international banker

== Journalism and literature ==
- Alice Ames Winter (1865–1944), American litterateur, author, clubwoman, suffragist
- Brenno de Winter (born 1971), Dutch ICT and investigative journalist
- Douglas E. Winter (born 1950), American author and editor
- Henry Winter (born 1963), British journalist
- John Strange Winter (1856–1911), pen name of Henrietta Eliza Vaughan Stannard, English novelist
- Lee Winter, Australian novelist
- Samuel Vincent Winter (1843–1904), Australian newspaperman and mayor of Richmond, Victoria
- Zikmund Winter (1846–1912), Czech novelist and historian

== Military ==
- August Winter (1897–1979), German general
- Donald C. Winter (born 1947), US secretary of the Navy
- Ormonde Winter (1875–1962), British general and intelligence officer

== Politics and law ==
- Beth Winter, British member of Parliament elected 2019
- Bob Winter (born 1937), lord provost of Glasgow
- Brad Winter (born 1952), American politician from the state of New Mexico
- Christian Winter (born 1987), German politician
- Elmer Winter (1912–2009), American lawyer who co-founded Manpower Inc.
- Ernst Florian Winter (1923–2014), American historian and political scientist
- Ernst Karl Winter (1895–1959), Austrian sociologist
- Faith Winter (1980–2025), U.S. legislator
- Frank Winter (1906–1976), South Island Māori leader
- Gonzalo Winter, Chilean lawyer and politician, congressman representing the 10th district of Santiago
- Gordon Arnaud Winter (1912–2003), Canadian politician from Newfoundland
- Harrison Lee Winter (1921–1990), United States federal judge
- Harry A. Winter (1889–1969), Newfoundland judge and politician
- James A. Winter (1886–1971), Newfoundland lawyer and politician
- James Spearman Winter (1845–1911), premier of Newfoundland
- Klaus Winter (1936–2000), German judge
- Ludwig Georg Winter (1778–1838), German politician
- Martin Winter (mayor) (born 1962), mayor of Doncaster, England
- Ralph K. Winter Jr. (1935–2020), American judge
- Steven Winter (legal scholar), American law professor
- Ty Winter, American politician from Colorado

== Religion ==
- Allen Winter (1903–1997), Anglican bishop
- Bruce W. Winter (born 1939), conservative evangelical New Testament scholar
- Colin Winter (1928–1981), English Anglican bishop
- Cornelius Winter (1742–1808), Methodist preacher
- Daniel Winter, one of the three main founders of the Orange Order
- Miriam Therese Winter (born 1938), Catholic theologian
- Terry Winter (televangelist) (1942–1998), Canadian religious leader

== Sciences ==
- Andreas Winter (born 1971), German mathematician and mathematical physicist
- Ernő Winter (1897–1971), engineer who developed barium lamps
- Ernst Florian Winter (1923–2014), Austrian-American historian and political scientist
- George D. Winter (1927–1981), British medical researcher
- Sir Gregory Winter (born 1951), British antibodies researcher
- Hannspeter Winter (1941–2006), Austrian plasma physicist
- Heinrich Georg Winter (1848–1887), German mycologist
- Jean-Pierre Winter (1951–2025), French psychoanalyst and writer

== Sports ==
- Adrian Winter (born 1986), Swiss professional footballer
- Andy Winter (born 2002), Scottish footballer
- Aron Winter (born 1967), Dutch footballer
- Arthur Winter (1844–1937), English priest and cricketer
- Blaise Winter (born 1962), American football coach and former player
- Brian Winter (born 1968), Scottish former football referee
- Cecil Winter (1879–1964), English cricketer, teacher and RAF officer
- Cliff Winter (1884–1918), English footballer
- Elaine Winter (athlete) (born 1932), South African sprinter
- Elaine Winter (figure skater) (1895–?), German figure skater
- Fred Winter (1926–2004), British National Hunt racing racehorse jockey and trainer
- Margie Winter (born 2002), Micronesian swimmer
- Nick Winter (1894–1955), Australian athlete
- Peter Winter (athlete) (born 1971), Australian decathlete
- Stefan Winter (ski mountaineer) (born 1988), German national ski mountaineering coach and alpine sports author
- Tex Winter (1922–2018), American basketball coach
- Trevor Winter (born 1974), American basketball player

== Other ==
- Christopher Winter (pirate), English pirate active in the Caribbean
- David A. Winter (1930–2012), distinguished professor emeritus of the University of Waterloo
- Ella Winter (1898–1980), Australian-British journalist and activist
- Elly Winter (1898–1987), German communist and notable political activist
- Howie Winter (1929–2020), American convicted criminal
- Jay Winter (born 1945), professor of history
- Miriam Winter (1933–2014), German Nazi Holocaust survivor
- Solomon Winter (1778–1859), Hungarian philanthropist
- Timothy Winter (born 1960), British Islamic scholar

== See also ==
- Winters (name)
- Winterson
- De Winter (surname)
- Wynter (disambiguation), includes list of people with the name Wynter
