= Georg Herber =

- Born: Johann Georg Herber; 30 January 1763; Winkel, Nassau-Weilburg, Holy Roman Empire (Germany)
- Died: 11 March 1833 (aged 70); Eltville, Nassau, German Confederation
- Education: Mainz
- Occupations: Jurist; Government legal official parliamentarian President of the "estates" (lower house of parliament)
- Known for: Leading parliamentary (and broader) opposition to the Duke of Nassau in the Domains Dispute
- Spouse: Margarethe Travers (1769-1826)
- Children: y
- Parents: Johann Georg Anton Herber (?-1794) (father); Klara Elisabeth Gerster (1736-1825) (mother)

Georg Herber (30 January 1763 - 11 March 1833) was a child of The Enlightenment and jurist who entered government service, becoming a politician in his late middle age. He came to prominence in the Duchy of Nassau as a member of the duchy's "estates" (bicameral parliament). Though small in terms of territory, the duchy was not without influence in Germany due, in part, to the status of its ruler as a senior archbishop and as a prince-elector of the empire. Herber sat as a member of the lower house between 1818 and 1832, during most of which period he served, between 1819 and 1832, as president of the chamber.

== Life and career ==
Johann Georg Herber was born at Winkel, a small town stretched out along the north bank of the Rhine between Rüdesheim and Wiesbaden. Johann Georg Anton Herber, his father, is described as a cooper (maker of wine barrels) and the owner of a winery, indicating that the boy was born into circumstances of at least some modest financial security. Herber studied Jurisprudence, probably across the river at Mainz, and in 1785 entered the service with the "Kurfürst" (loosely, "Prince-elector-archbishop") of Mainz. For the next fifteen years he was employed in an administrative capacity, probably working in the justice system. Like many contemporaries who had grown up as believers in Enlightenment ideals, Herber was nevertheless appalled by the bloodshed and "Revolutionary Wars" unleashed following the French Revolution. From his time as a government justice official several hand-written reports survive in which he advocates a curtailing of the privileges of the aristocracy, and the introduction of a new social order based on equality before the law. From the much changed perspective of the twentieth century, an admiring commentator has been able to identify Herber as an outstanding representative of moderate bourgeois liberalism in Nassau. Taking what is known of his career in the round, however, there is no indication that he ever renounced the monarchical principle, and he later emerged as a resolute defender of the constitutional rights of the state parliament.

It is known that Herber served as an "Amtsvogt" (or "local bailiff" - a senior local administrator) for Geisenheim (another town on the right bank, upriver of Rüdesheim. In 1801 he accepted the more senior position as Amtskeller, for nearby Eltville. Since 1797 political influence over Nassau had increasingly been in the hands of the French, although the adoption of a collaborative approach preserved a certain level of local autonomy. This was somewhat diminished following a series of major territorial adjustments imposed in 1803 by the "Imperial Diet" under irresistible pressure from an increasingly assertive government in Paris, and in the context of the so-called Reichsdeputationshauptschluss. Despite the many high level political changes taking place, Herber retained his position at Eltville as Amtskeller. In 1805 his job titles became "Amtmann" and in 1808 "Justizrat", but he remained at Eltville: it is not clear whether or how far his duties in respect of justice administration changed.

1814 was a year of changes. In September 1814 a new liberal constitution was set introduced in Nassau. Herber's view of it is not known, but according to one report he faced a disciplinary investigation on account of "oppositional utterances", following which, in 1815, he "voluntarily" resigned from government service, forfeiting his entitlement to any pension. This is not wholly incompatible with an alternative report of the matter, according to which he was offered the opportunity to transfer from Eltville to the Justice Department facility at Höchst, near Frankfurt (into which the little town has subsequently been subsumed). It was after he turned down the transfer offer that, in May 1815, he was dismissed from office without a pension. Despite the absence of a pension, he was evidently not greatly impoverished by this development, since he immediately purchased the Draiser Hof, a formerly monastic farm estate on the edge of Eltville, which would presumably have provided an income. The estate had been "secularised" during the reforms of 1803, passing to the Duke of Nassau who had managed to remain closely allied to Napoleon. The Duke had gifted it to his valued representative at the "Imperial Diet", Hans Christoph Ernst von Gagern, and it was from Gagern that Georg Herber acquired it.

The final defeat of Napoleon in 1815 was followed by a period of conservative retrenchment across Europe. However, the radical ideas that had inspired the French Revolution, and the ensuing quarter century, could not be undone. The Holy Roman Empire had been abolished in 1806, and despite more than half a century of uncertainty and debate over how it might be replaced, there was no serious suggestion that it could be reinstated as before. For Georg Herber's career of public service, the outlook turned out more positively. The remarkably "modern" 1814 constitution had outlived the war, and just four years after its promulgation, in 1818, the new duke, influenced by an increasingly intense petitions and demands from citizens, scheduled elections to the lower house of "the estates" (the term generally applied in English language sources for the duchy's new parliament). The voters of the Wiesbaden electoral district comprised a group of substantial local land owners who were responsible for electing approximately a third of the members in the assembly. Georg Herber was one of those elected. During the next fourteen years he very quickly emerged as a resolute defender of the rights of the parliament, which placed him in frequent opposition to the duke, who evidently viewed parliamentary intervention in the business of government as an unwelcome challenge to his own ducal rights. The next year Herber took over from his fellow parliamentarian, the former Theology professor Christian Wilhelm Snell, as president of the assembly. He was re-elected to the parliament in 1825, at which point his presidency of the chamber was re-confirmed.

In 1824 he was appointed to the distinction of a privy councillor in recognition of his contributions as president of the chamber. During the next parliamentary session, after 1825, he took trouble to preserve it, although the second half of the 1820s proved more fractious, as the so-called Domains Dispute heated up. Despite its complexity, the underlying issue was a simple one: in 1806, when the Duchy of Nassau was set up in the form in which it would exist largely unchanged till 1866, Chief Minister von Bieberstein carefully disentangled the assets of the duchy in order to create a clear fiscal separation between, on the one hand, the duke's personal assets, such as manors and other properties, mineral springs and remaining personal tithes and rents, which were to be treated as the private assets of the duke, and on the other hand, the "Generaldomänenkasse" ("General Domain Treasury") and state tax receipts. The separation had been contentious from the outset, and triggered repeated disputes as the duke himself grew in confidence, and defended with greater determination the "understanding" that the ducal "household assets" should neither be applied to fund government expenditure nor subjected to any sort of oversight or determination by "the estates" (parliament). Disputes arose regularly, not helped by the fact that the creation of the Duchy of Nassau in 1806 had resulted from a merger of Nassau-Weilburg, Nassau-Usingen, parts of Orange-Nassau and a number of smaller territories, each of which came to the merged duchy with a different set of traditions when it came to the relationship between the ruler, his property and the people over whom he ruled. During the later 1820s there was a growing flow of citizens' petitions and press reports triggered by "Domains Disputes" arising under these arrangements. Domains Dispute issues featured ever more prominently on the parliamentary agenda. The president of the lower house, Georg Herber, took a lead in standing up for the rights of the parliament, becoming the most important liberal representative of the liberal opposition to the duke's government. Nor did he restrict himself to the parliament chamber. His book on "Der Domänenstreit im Herzogtum Nassau", preceded by a succession of legal and political treatises, created something of a sensation, convincing many parliamentarians and influential citizens of the liberal position, and earning admiration from liberal circles in states beyond the frontiers of Nassau. It also made him the enemy of the duke.

The success of the 1830 July Revolution in Paris intensified the nervousness of rulers and their governments across much of western Europe, while those keen to move on from absolutist government were also encouraged by regime change in France. As leader of the liberal faction in the elected part of the bicameral Nassau parliament, Herber asserted to the duke that parliament was entitled to reject government tax measures. The exchange took place in the presence of Chief Minister von Bieberstein. Herber was neither a dangerous democrat nor any sort of a regicidal republican. In terms of many of the ideas that the French Revolution had, for a time, legitimised, and in terms of many of the radical ideas that resurfaced during the revolutions of 1830, Herber was very moderate in his own reformist agenda. The duke's The duke's hostility against him nevertheless grew. During 1931 a handwritten memorandum in which Herber set out his proposals for constitutional reform found their way to the media. A printed version of the memorandum was published as a supplement with the "Hanauer Zeitung", a "foreign newspaper" produced in the adjacent Electorate of Hesse, on 20 October 1831. There was no suggestion that Herber had either wished or known that his constitutional proposals would appear in the newspaper. By the end of 1831 the Ducal Appellate court ("Hof- und Appellationsgericht") of Nassau was working on criminal charges to be brought against Herber. As government pressure intensified, Herber remained robust in sharing is views. In 1832 Herber was one of 15 members of the "estates" who boycotted the chamber as a protest against the government's anti-democratic "Pairsschub", which involved appointing additional members to the upper (nominated) house of parliament in order to increase the balance of support in favour of the government. The government responded by withdrawing his parliamentary mandate, thereby removing him permanently from his parliamentary seat. The landed gentlemen of Wiesbaden elected a man called Nikolaus Kunz, of whom relatively little is known, to take his place and remained a member of the chamber till 1838.

Georg Herber appeared before The Ducal Appellate court at the end of 1832. The charge was that he had insulted both The Duke and his Chief Minister. The trial was a low-key affair. In view of the heightened political temperature, the court had recently taken the precaution of relocating from the city of Wiesbaden to more remote premises in the little country town of Usingen. Herber was convicted and on 3 December 1832 sentenced to a three year prison term. Overnight on 4/5 December 1832 he was arrested in his bed and taken to a place of detention. On 7 January 1833 he was released on bail while his defence attorney, August Hergenhahn sought to obtain a reduction in the sentence. (Note: August Hergenhahn was both a lawyer and a liberal politician who would later serve as a member of the Frankfurt Parliament and himself lead Nassau's short-lived revolutionary government in 1848/49.)

No reduction in sentence was obtained. However, by this time Heber was seriously ill, and before he could be returned to prison he died, at Eltville, on 11 March 1833. His body is buried in the local cemetery.
