= Rafael Joseffy =

Hungarian Jewish pianist, teacher and composer (1852–1915)

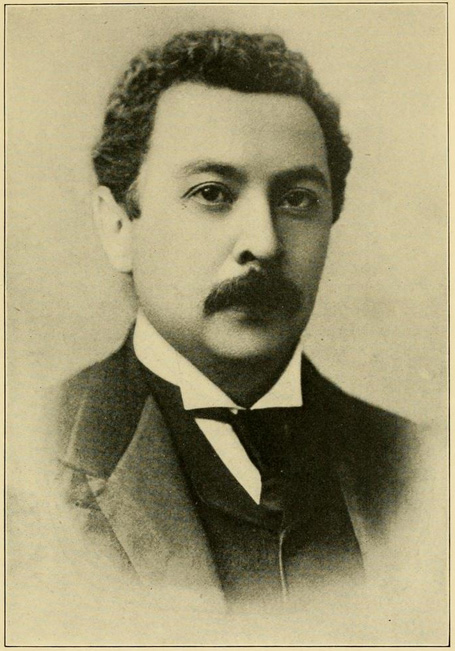
Rafael Joseffy

Rafael Joseffy (July 3, 1852 – June 25, 1915) was a Hungarian Jewish pianist, teacher and composer.

== Life ==
Rafael Joseffy was born in Hunfalu, Szepes County (now Huncovce, Slovakia) in 1852. His youth was spent in Miskolc, and he began his study of the piano there at the age of eight. He studied in Budapest with Friedrich Brauer, the teacher of Stephen Heller. In 1866, he went to Leipzig, where his teachers were Ignaz Moscheles and Ernst Ferdinand Wenzel. In 1868, he became a pupil of Karl Tausig in Berlin, remaining with him for two years. Later he spent two summers with Franz Liszt in Weimar. He made his debut in Berlin in 1872.

He moved to the United States in 1879, where he lived in New York City. Joseffy made his American debut in New York in 1879, with an orchestra under Leopold Damrosch. He soon after played with the New York Philharmonic Orchestra, and subsequently made many appearances in New York and other American cities with Theodore Thomas and the Theodore Thomas Orchestra. In December 1889 he was a soloist with the Boston Symphony Orchestra under Arthur Nikisch for the grand opening of Lincoln Music Hall in Washington, D.C.

Joseffy was soloist for the inaugural concerts of the Chicago Symphony Orchestra on October 16 and 17, 1891, performing Tchaikovsky's First Piano Concerto with Thomas conducting at the Auditorium Theatre in Chicago.

Joseffy produced numerous popular compositions for the piano as well as editing works of Frédéric Chopin and other composers for G. Schirmer music publishers. Several of his songs were translated from German to English by Helen Tretbar.

His students included the American composer and singer Florence Turner-Maley.

He died in New York City in 1915, aged 62.

== Sources ==
- Darryl Lyman: Great Jews in Music. J. D. Publishers, Middle Village, N.Y, 1986.
- Stanley Sadie, H. Wiley Hitchcock (Ed.): The New Grove Dictionary of American Music. Grove's Dictionaries of Music, New York, N.Y. 1986.
- Finding Aid for Rafael Joseffy Music and Personal Papers, 1899–1905 The Sousa Archives and Center for American Music
