= Stefan Winter =

Stefan Winter may refer to:

- Stefan Winter (ski mountaineer)
- Stefan Winter (historian)
- Stefan Winter (music producer)
