= Adolf Marschall von Bieberstein (politician, 1806–1891) =

German politician (1806–1891)

- Born: Adolf Ludwig Marschall von Bieberstein; 10 March 1806; Karlsruhe, Grand Duchy of Baden, Confederation of the Rhine (French empire)
- Died: 11 September 1891 (aged 85); Unteribental (Freiburg), Grand Duchy of Baden, Germany
- Occupations: Politician; Foreign Minister; Diplomat
- Spouse: Marie Luise Marschall von Bieberstein (1819–1904)
- Children: 3 including Adolf Marschall von Bieberstein (1848–1920)
- Parents: Karl Wilhelm Marschall von Bieberstein (1763–1817) (father); Wilhelmine von Reck (1782–1856) (mother)

Adolf Marschall von Bieberstein (10 March 1806 – 11 September 1891) was a Baden politician and diplomat.

== Biography ==
=== Provenance and early years ===
Adolf Ludwig Marschall von Bieberstein was born into a well-connected Protestant family at Karlsruhe, second of the three recorded sons of Karl Wilhelm Marschall von Bieberstein (1763–1817), a leading politician who himself served at various stages of the as Interior Minister of the Grand Duchy of Baden, following its creation in 1806. Adolf had a sister, a year younger than he was. The children's mother, born Wilhelmine von Reck (1782–1856), also came from an aristocratic family. In political terms the von Biebersteins were already among the leading families in the Grand Duchy, but the times were difficult. Adolf was born at the height of the Napoleonic Wars, and much of what later became Germany was part of the French Empire. Baden retained a measure of autonomy as part of the emperor's Confederation of the Rhine, but it was necessary for the government constantly to nurture the alliance with France assiduously. From the perspective of anglophone historiography Baden is generally perceived as having been just one more of Napoleon's many client states at the time of Adolf Marschall von Bieberstein was born, and indeed till 1813. August Marschall von Bieberstein] (1804–1888), Adolf's older brother, would also become a politicians-diplomat. The two were close companions while the boys were growing up and remained close, both as friends and as political allies, throughout their respective careers.

=== Education ===
Between 1813 and 1817 while his father was posted to the royal court at Württemberg, Adolf Marschall von Bieberstein attended the lyceum (secondary school) in Stuttgart. Following his father's death, his widowed mother returned with her children to Baden, and he attended the lyceum in Karlsruhe between 1817 and 1824. On 4 May 1824, despite the two year difference in their ages, Adolf Marschall von Bieberstein and his elder brother enrolled together as students at the University of Göttingen to study for a degree in “Staats- und Finanzwissenschaften” (‘’loosely, “statecraft and public financial administration”’’). The brothers were active members if the “Corps Bado-Württembergia” (student fraternity). On 5 May 1825, both brothers switched to Heidelberg University.

=== Public service ===
In 1828, having passed the necessary state exams, Marschall von Bieberstein entered the Grand Duchy's civil service, employed initially as a clerk in the regional administrative department for Freiburg and the surrounding region, located at the southern end of Baden. He was soon transferred back to Karlsruhe, the capital, where he was employed at the Ministry of Finance. He moved again in 1833, this time to Mannheim where he was employed as an Assessor at the Ministry for Domestic Affairs. Here he was employed as a ministerial secretary, answerable directly to Ludwig Georg Winter, the minister. By this time the economic austerity that followed the war had lifted completely, and Mannheim was growing rapidly as a centre of commerce and industry and, importantly in terms of Marschall von Bieberstein's future interest in infrastructure creation, as a transport hub.

In 1833 the Mannheim entrepreneur Ludwig Newhouse came up with a detailed proposal for a railway line linking Mannheim to Basel. Trade routes up the Rhine valley were already being greatly improved through a massive scheme to channel the Rhine, providing for larger boats and greater reliability in respect of river transport between Switzerland and – via Baden – the Dutch coast and the North Sea. The railway proposal seemed to provide more questions and answers in terms both of engineering technology and of the necessary legal framework and land rights. The government in Karlsruhe was not, in the first instance, enthusiastic. Nevertheless, developments in England and Belgium persuaded governments in the more progressive states of Germany that in an age of rapidly advancing steam power the beneficial opportunities available from railway technology might become even greater than the challenges. In Baden a trusted full time government official was needed with the appropriate administrative and legislative education and experience to create a legislative framework within which a railway between Mannheim and Basel might be constructed. In 1837 Adolf Marschall von Bieberstein was appointed “Regierungsrat” (‘’loosely, “senior government advisor”’’) tasked with drawing up the necessary legislation. It is not clear whether, at this stage, the government or anyone else was aware of the scale of the task. By the end of 1838 at least five laws had been passed covering construction, funding and administration of the proposed railway as far as the Swiss frontier at Basel. The ”Ständeversammlung” (‘’parliament of the Grand Duchy’’) was summoned for an extraordinary (special) session of unprecedented duration, extending from 12 February 1838 till 26 March 1838. During that time there were four sittings for the upper house and ten for the second chamber, Marschall von Bieberstein attended the hearings in the second house as “government commissar”. This extraordinary parliament is also identified as later sources as “the railway parliament”. Marschall von Bieberstein remained in post as “Regierungsrat”, contributing leadership and a necessary eye for detail, till 1844, to the early development of Baden's railways. The first stretch of the line towards Basel, connecting Mannheim to Heidelberg, was opened in 1840. By 1845 it had reached as far south as Freiburg.

In 1844 Marschall von Bieberstein was appointed managing director at the government's “Oberdirektion des Wasser- und Straßenbaus” (‘’”Head office for water and land transport development”’’), a role he retained until the 1848/49 revolution culminated in two months of de facto civil war during May–July 1849 and the (short-lived) removal of the government and its supporting institutions by republican forces. His directorial duties embraced the continuing railway development but also the continuing project to channel the Rhine, which may have been a more time consuming responsibility. During the parliamentary session that ran from 1847 till 1849 Marschall von Bieberstein also sat as a member of the upper house of the Ständeversammlung, nominated to the parliament as the representative of the University of Freiburg.

=== Revolution in Baden ===
In the context of Germany in 1848/48, senior government officials risked being forced to transfer their allegiance to and work for revolutionary-republican governments (or worse) in the event of an existing government being overthrown. In Baden the risks appeared most acute during the first half of 1849, and at the end of April 1849 Marschall von Bieberstein crossed the Rhine with his young family and made a temporary home, like a number of other senior officials from Baden, in Lauterburg which (till 1871) was part of France). France was not unaffected by the revolutionary tide of 1848, but most of the fighting in France took place far to the west, in and around Paris, where the election to the presidency of the new republic of the popular demagogue Louis-Napoleon Bonaparte in December 1848 had put an end both to the July Monarchy and, for the time being, the street fighting. Marschall von Bieberstein was still in Lauterburg in early June when he received a hand-written note from the Grand Duke who had also found himself forced to flee, a couple of weeks after Marschall von Bieberstein had made his own move. Grand Duke Leopold had fled not to the west, however, but to the north. He had found refuge in Mainz, from where he had written his note on 31 May 1849. By this time a substantial army under Prussian leadership was approaching from the east, and it was widely – and correctly – assumed that within a few months the revolutionary militias in Baden would have been put to flight. Elsewhere, across much of Germany the revolutions of 1848 seemed already to be coming to an end. In anticipation of this development the Grand Duke Leopold was setting up a government in exile under the leadership of Friedrich Adolf Klüber, from his grand ducal refuge in Mainz. Marschall von Bieberstein was offered and accepted a position as Interior Minister in Klüber's government, with effect from 21 June 1849: this made him the second most senior member of the government after the uprisings had been quelled by the end of July 1849. He remained in post throughout the four-year term of the Klüber government.

=== Ministerial resignation ===
Friedrich Adolf Klüber retired in 1850 to be replaced as “prime minister” by Ludwig Rüdt, a younger man, widely perceived as being more conservative and more forthright than his predecessor. Two years later the Grand Duke Leopold died. A regency became necessary due to the mental incapacity of his son and heir. Meanwhile, the seeds were sown of the disagreements that evolved into the “Baden Kultukampf” when catholic bishops in the west of Germany agreed among themselves to launch a push-back against growing involvement by governments in the sensitive business of church appointments. In Baden the most prominent opponent of state interference in church personnel decisions was the Archbishop of Freiburg, Hermann von Vicari. Although the most visible origins of the dispute, lay to the north, it was in Baden that the church:state confrontation became most openly heated, especially after Prime Minister Ludwig Rüdt tried to settle the entire business by negotiating directly with the Pope, behind the backs of Baden's own episcopal leadership. Marschall von Bieberstein was not even a Roman Catholic, but he had close links with many leading figures in the Freiburg region, and had found himself increasingly out of sympathy with Ludwig Rüdt's negotiating tactics. Caught in the middle of a dispute not of his making, on 2 June 1853 he “retired” from his position as Interior Minister to be succeeded by Friedrich von Wechmar

=== Diplomat ===
At the time of his first “retirement” Marschall von Bieberstein had been aged just 47, and in May 1856 he accepted an invitation from the regent to return to government service, this time as a diplomat. He was sent to the Court of the King of Prussia in Berlin as the Ambassador of Baden. He served in this mission till 1864. His most high-profile achievement in Berlin which came at the start of his posting, was his conduct of the negotiations that preceded the marriage between the regent and, after 1858, Grand Duke of Baden and Princess Louise, the daughter of the Prussian king. Both politically and in terms of the success of the marriage in personal terms, it turned out to be an auspicious piece of match making. There was something of an intellectual awakening underway in Berlin at this time, and Ambassador Marschall von Bieberstein was able to get to know some of the leading German intellectuals of his generation, including Alexander von Humboldt, August Böckh and Alexander Braun. The spread of rail transport was greatly reducing journey times, and following his posting to Berlin Marschall von Bieberstein was also accredited as Baden's ambassador at the court of the kings of Saxony (in Dresden) and of Hanover. In Dresden, indeed, he succeeded in creating a personal friendship with King John. One of Marschall von Bieberstein's final special diplomatic missions took place in February 1863 when he travelled to St. Petersburg in connection with the marriage of Prince William, the younger brother of the Grand Duke, to the Princess Maria Maximilianovna of Leuchtenberg. In May 1864 he entered into a second early retirement, again at his own instigation. He had found himself at odds with the government policy pursued by the Foreign Minister, Franz von Roggenbach over the principal international issue of the time. Von Roggenbach was impatient for full German unification under the militarily strong leadership of Prussia, as a way to counter the military dominance of France and the Russian Empire. In the ongoing power rivalries with the church, von Roggenbach was implacably opposed to ultramontanism. It is not clear that Marschall von Bieberstein had ever been drawn to such an uncompromising approach to international relations. By 1864 he was, in any event, no longer prepared to go along with such a confrontational policy.

== Personal ==
On 27 October 1846 Adolf Ludwig Baronet Marschall von Bieberstein married Marie Luise Marschall von Bieberstein (1819–1904). They were first cousins: Conrad Otto Christoph Marschall von Bieberstein (1726–1796), was grandfather to both of them. Marie was the youngest of the eight recorded children of Adolf's uncle, Ernst Franz Ludwig Marschall von Bieberstein (1770–1834). The marriage was followed by the births of their two recorded sons and one daughter. One of their sons, Adolf Marschall von Bieberstein (1848–1920) served as Foreign Minister of the Grand Duchy of Baden between 1905 and 1911.

After his final retirement from public office in 1864, Adolf Marschall von Bieberstein relocated with his family to Freiburg im Breisgau, where his brother August was already living.
