= John Winters =

John Winters may refer to:

- John Winters (footballer) (born 1960), English footballer
- John D. Winters (1916–1997), American historian
- John W. Winters (1920–2004), American real estate developer, politician, and civil rights activist

== See also ==
- John Winter (disambiguation)
