= Anton von Schmerling =

Austrian statesman (1805–1893)

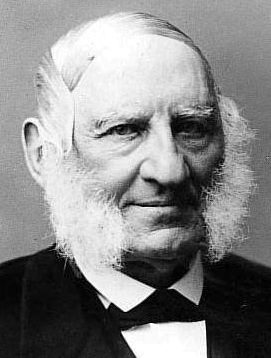
- Photograph of Schmerling, undated

Minister President of Germany
- In office 24 September 1848 – 15 December 1848
- Monarch: Johan, Regent of the Empire
- Preceded by: Karl zu Leiningen
- Succeeded by: Heinrich von Gagern

Interior Minister of the Austrian Empire
- In office 13 December 1860 – 26 June 1865
- Monarch: Kaiser Franz Josef
- Prime Minister: Count Johann Bernhard von Rechberg und Rothenlöwen (1860–1861); Archduke Rainer Ferdinand of Austria (1861–1865)
- Preceded by: Count Agenor Gołuchowski
- Succeeded by: Count Richard Belcredi

Personal details
- Born: 23 August 1805 Lichtental, Vienna, Austrian Empire
- Died: 23 May 1893 (aged 87) Vienna, Austria-Hungary
- Spouse: Pauline von Koudelka-Schmerling

Anton Ritter von Schmerling (23 August 1805 – 23 May 1893) was an Austrian statesman.

== Life ==
Von Schmerling was born in Vienna, where his father held a high position on the judicial side of the civil service.

After studying law at Vienna, in 1829 Schmerling entered the public service, and during the next eighteen years was constantly occupied, chiefly in Lower Austria. In 1847, as a member of the lesser nobility, he entered the Estates of Lower Austria and took an active part in the Liberal movement for administrative and constitutional reform of which they were the center. On the outbreak of the revolution in Vienna in March 1848, when the mob broke into the Assembly, Schmerling was one of the deputation which carried to the palace the demands of the people, and during the next few days he was much occupied in organizing the newly formed National Guard. At the end of the month he was sent by the ministry to Frankfurt as one of the men of public confidence.

He soon succeeded Count Colloredo as president of the Confederate Diet, and in this capacity officially transferred to Archduke John of Austria, who had been elected regent of Germany, the powers of the Diet on 12 July 1848. For this he was violently attacked in the National Assembly by the extreme Radicals; but on this and other occasions (he had himself been elected to the National Assembly) he defended himself effectively because he depended not on eloquence but on a recognition of what has been called the irony of facts to which the parliament as a whole was so blind.

Schmerling was the first and the most influential member of the ministry which the Regent formed; from 15 July he held the ministry of the interior and foreign affairs, and it was almost entirely due to him that, at least for while, this phantom government maintained some appearance of power and dignity.

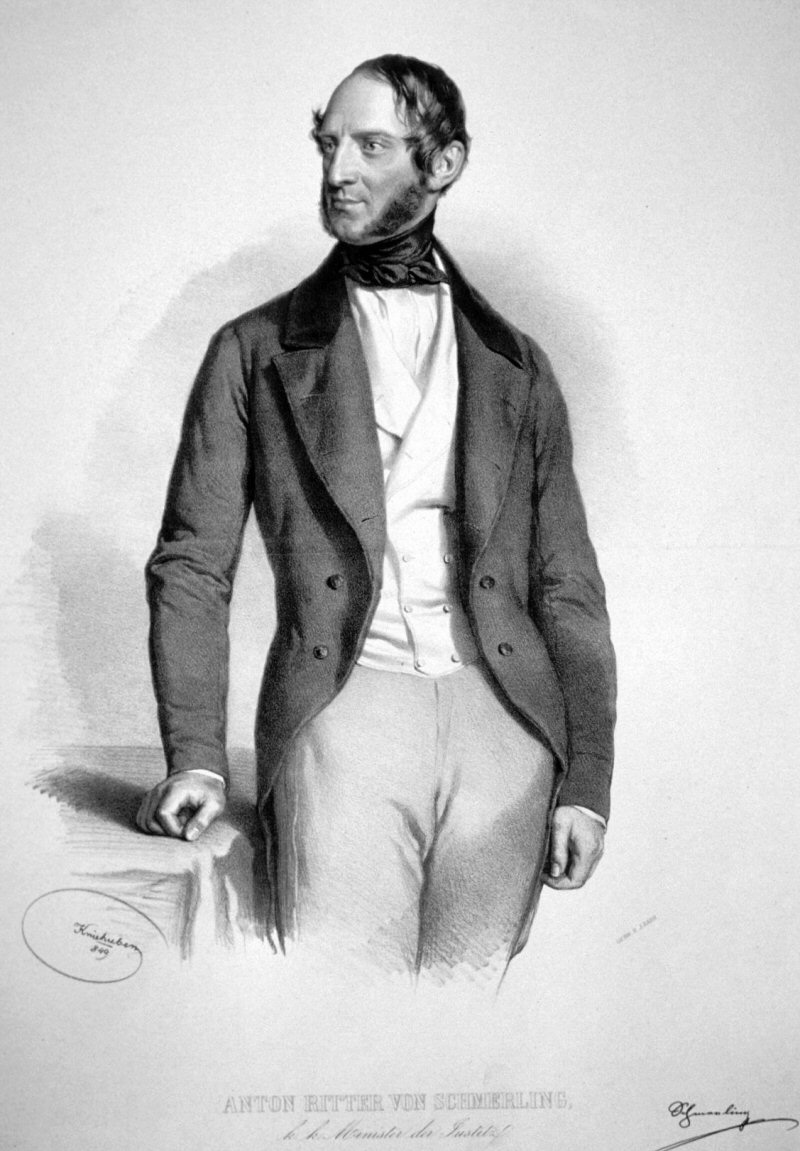
Lithograph of Schmerling by Josef Kriehuber, 1849

With the resignation of Prince Carl zu Leiningen on 5 September 1848, the Regent requested Schmerling to form a new ministry after Frederick Dahlmann had failed to do so. A defeat in the parliament when he defended the Armistice of Malmö led to his resignation; but he was immediately called to office again, with practically dictatorial power, in order to quell the revolt which broke out in Frankfurt on 18 September. His courage and resolution averted what nearly became a terrible catastrophe. It was his hope to establish in Germany the supremacy of a Liberal and reformed Austria. This brought him into opposition to the party of Prussian supremacy; and when they attained a majority, he resigned, and was succeeded by Heinrich von Gagern. He remained at Frankfurt, holding the post of Austrian envoy, and was the leader of the Grossdeutsche (the party supporting the idea of Greater Germania) until the dissolution of the Kremsier Parliament showed that the forces of reaction had conquered at Vienna and shattered all hopes of Austria attaining the position he had hoped for her.

After the abortive election of King Frederick William IV of Prussia to be emperor, he, with the other Austrians, were ordered to leave Frankfurt by the Austrian government on 5 April 1849. On his return to Vienna he became minister of justice, and the reforms which he carried out added to his reputation. His popularity among all Liberals was increased by his resignation in 1851, as a protest against the failure of the government to establish the constitution they had promised. During the-next few years he was judge of the supreme court of appeal. When his forecast was fulfilled, and the system of absolutism broke down, he became minister in January 1862.

His first act was the publication of the constitution by which the whole of the empire was to be organized as a single state with a parliamentary government. The experiment failed, chiefly because of the opposition of the Croatians and Magyars, whom he bitterly offended by his celebrated saying that Hungary could wait. Faults of manner, natural in a man whose life had been spent as an official and a judge, prevented him from keeping together the German Liberals as a strong and united party; he was opposed by a powerful faction at court, and by the Clerical leaders. After the first few months, Emperor Franz Joseph I gave him only a very lukewarm support; and with his retirement in 1865 the attempt to carry out the ideals of Joseph II to Germanize while he liberalized the whole of the empire, and to compel Hungarians, Poles, Czechs and Croatians to accept a system in which the government of the whole should be carried on by a German-speaking parliament and bureaucracy, failed. The constitution of 1862, though suspended on Schmerling's fall, was still regarded as legally valid for the Cisleithanian territories.

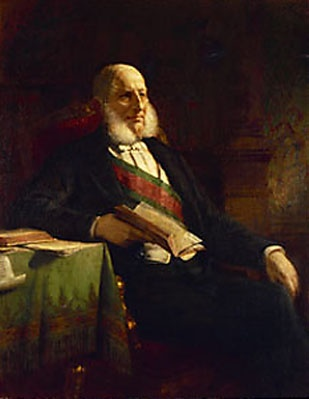
Portrait of Schmerling by Friedrich von Amerling

On his retirement he returned to his judicial duties; in 1867 he was made life-member of the Upper House (Herrenhaus) in the Reichsrat, of which he became vice-president, and in 1871 president. This post he laid down in 1879, and came forward as leader of the Liberal German opposition to the administration of Count Taaffe. In 1891 he retired from public life, and died at Vienna on 23 May 1893.

In 1835 Schmerling married Pauline von Koudelka, a daughter of field marshal lieutenant Freiherr von Koudelka. She was distinguished by her literary and artistic abilities, at that time rare in the Austrian capital, but she died young in 1840, leaving two daughters.

=== The Schmerling Government ===
The Schmerling Government was formed in September 1848 during the Revolution of 1848 in German-speaking Europe. It served as the government of the Provisional Central Authority created by the Frankfurt Parliament, which tried to unify Germany under a constitutional framework. Anton von Schmerling, an Austrian liberal statesman, took over after the resignation of the previous ministry. His cabinet attempted to stabilize the revolutionary movement and create a functioning central government for a united Germany. The Schmerling ministry supported a constitutional and parliamentary German nation-state, cooperation between the German states, and stronger central authority. However, the government struggled because many German princes resisted losing power, the Frankfurt Parliament lacked real enforcement power, and the revolutionary movement was losing momentum. The cabinet lasted only a few months and ended when political support collapsed. Despite its short life, it is remembered as one of the early attempts to build a unified, constitutional Germany.

== Orders and decorations ==
- Austrian Empire:
  - Grand Cross of the Austrian Imperial Order of Leopold, 1862
  - Grand Cross of the Royal Hungarian Order of Saint Stephen, 1873
- Spain: Grand Cross of the Royal and Distinguished Order of Charles III, 5 June 1875
- Baden: Knight of the House Order of Fidelity, 1849
- (Saxe-Coburg and Gotha) (Duchy of Saxe-Altenburg) (Saxe-Meiningen) Ernestine duchies: Grand Cross of the Saxe-Ernestine House Order, 1863
- Beylik of Tunis: Order of Glory

| Preceded by Count Agenor Gołuchowski | Interior Minister of the Austrian Empire; 1860–1865 | Succeeded by Count Richard Belcredi |
| Preceded by Karl zu Leiningen | Minister President of the German Empire; 24 September 1848 – 15 December 1848 | Succeeded by Heinrich von Gagern |
