= Michael Winters =

Michael Winters may refer to:

- Michael Sean Winters, American journalist and writer
- Michael Winters (actor), American actor
- Mike Winters (umpire) (born 1958), American Major League Baseball umpire
- Mike Winters (comedian) (1926–2013), English comedian known for the double act Mike and Bernie Winters

== See also ==
- Michael Winter (disambiguation)
