= Ernst Franz Ludwig Marschall von Bieberstein =

Nassau politician (1770–1834)

Ernst Marschall von Bieberstein
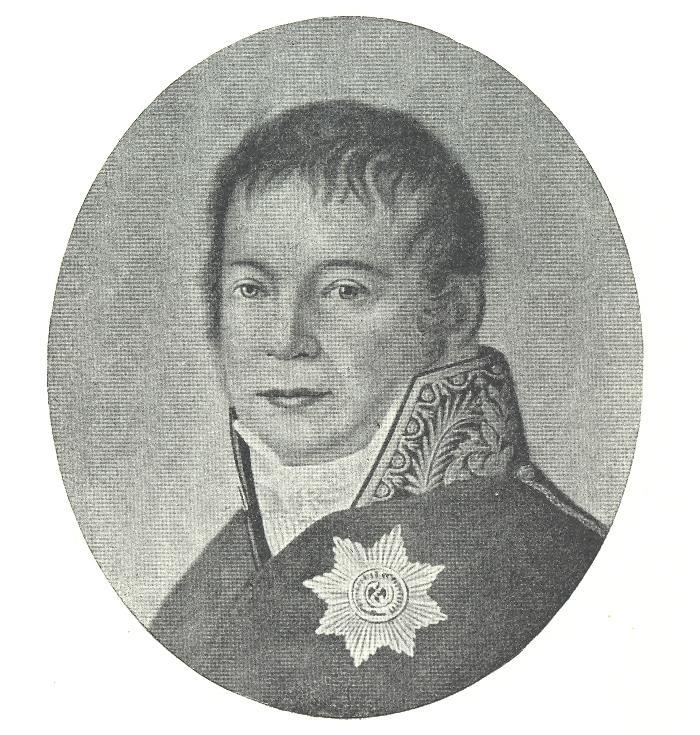
- Born: Ernst Franz Ludwig Marschall von Bieberstein; 2 August 1770; Wallerstein, Bavaria
- Died: 22 January 1834 (aged 63); Wiesbaden, Nassau
- Education: Karlsschule (military academy), Stuttgart
- Occupations: Government legal officer ("Regierungsassessor"); Diplomat; Government chief minister ("Staatsminister"); Head of government ("Regierungspräsident")
- Employer: Duchy of Nassau (1806–1866)
- Spouse: Karoline von Veltheim (1783–1840)
- Children: at least 11
- Parent(s): Conrad Otto Christoph Marschall von Bieberstein (1726–1796); Johanna Theresia Henriette von Wolff (1738–1783)

Ernst Marschall von Bieberstein (2 August 1770 - 22 January 1834) served as Chief Minister (Staatsminister) of the Duchy of Nassau between 1806 and 1834. Between 1806 he was one of two chief ministers of Nassau, but after the resignation of Hans Christoph Ernst von Gagern (apparently as an unintended consequence of a new imperial decree), Marschall von Bieberstein became in effect the sole leading politician in Nassau in 1809. During his early years he pursued a liberal course, but as conservatism returned to favour after the fall of Napoleon, his approach became strikingly more "restorationist".

== Family provenance ==
Ernst (Franz Ludwig) Freiherr Marschall von Bieberstein was born into a protestant family at Wallerstein (approximately 80 kilometers / 50 miles north of Augsburg), a younger son of Conrad Otto Christoph Marschall von Bieberstein (1726–96), an army officer and senior government administrator from Württemberg. and his wife 'Johanna Theresia Henriette' née Wolf from Ludwigsburg (1738 – 1783), who came from an army family. The aristocratic Marschall von Bieberstein family could trace their rise to eminence back at least to the thirteenth century, and the medieval Margravate of Meissen.

Ernst Marschall von Bieberstein had at least two elder brothers. Karl Wilhelm Marschall von Bieberstein (1763 – 1817) became a leading politician in the Grand Duchy of Baden. Friedrich August Marschall von Bieberstein (1768 – 1816) became a pioneering botanist. All three brothers attended the Karlsschule (military academy) in Stuttgart, which was at that time the capital of Württemberg.

== Life ==
=== School ===
Ernst attended the Karlsschule from 1782 till 1791. Along with a sound military training he also followed and successfully passed details courses in Philosophy and Law. The Karlsschule was an elite establishment: the younger two Marschall von Bieberstein brothers got to know Georges Cuvier (1769 – 1832) who later came to prominence as a notable naturalist-palaeontologist, and who became a lifelong family friend. Like many of his generation, Marschall von Bieberstein was initially sympathetic to many of the ideas underpinning the French Revolution.

=== Public service ===
In June 1791 Ernst Marschall von Bieberstein entered military service as a lieutenant in the district militia ("Kreiskontingent") under the command of Prince William of Nassau-Usingen. However, he was already destined, in the longer term, for a career in civil administration and after a year of military service he made the switch, taking a post as Court and Government Assessor. Despite his relative youth, in 1793 he travelled to The Hague on a diplomatic mission. However, he found himself arrested and detained by French troops. He was evidently soon released, since his political career serving the Duchy of Nassau took off. He was appointed a Regierungsrat later in 1793, and in 1795 became a member of the Privy Council. Further promotion followed, and he emerged as one of the most influential members of the government. The pressing issue of the times was the aggressive advance across western Europe of the French Revolutionary Army. Given the overwhelming superiority in terms of resources and numbers of the French forces, Marschall von Bieberstein was pragmatic, counselling a conciliatory approach. As early as 1793, echoing the views of the men who later came to be known as the Prussian reformers in Berlin, Marschall von Bieberstein had shared his opinion that the best protection against the revolutionary tide lay in adopting a constitution, though it would be another twenty years before he would have the opportunity to implement his own advice on this. In order to diminish revolutionary tendencies he also warned against imposing excessive "feudal burdens" on the population. In 1797, in defiance of the wishes of "Regierungspräsident" (head of government) Karl Friedrich von Kruse, that Ernst Marschall von Bieberstein undertook a diplomatic mission to Paris as part of a mediatisation policy, apparently of his own.

=== Regierungspräsident ===
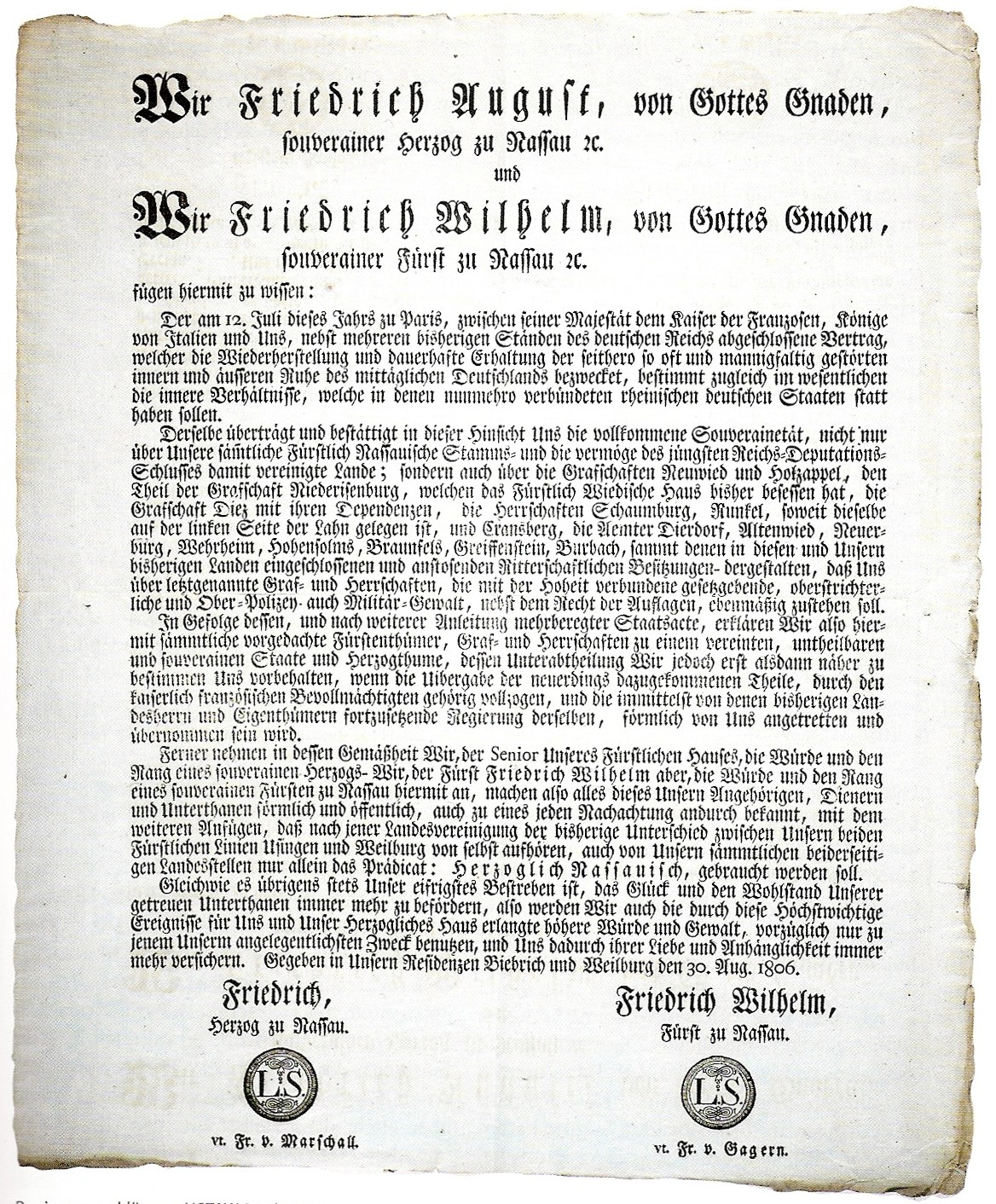
Foundation of the Duchy of Nassau, 1806

Karl-Wilhelm, Prince of Nassau-Usingen died in May 1803 and Karl Friedrich von Kruse's request that he be permitted to retire was accepted by the new prince. Ernst Franz Ludwig Freiherr Marschall von Bieberstein was appointed as the duchy's new "Regierungspräsident" (head of government). One of the most pressing tasks to be addressed involved the difficult negotiations over compensation for the duchy's lost territories on the left Bank of the Rhine. Marschall von Bieberstein's objective was to secure a discrete territory on the Right ("German") Bank of the Rhine, a goal which he pursued in close collaboration with government colleague, Hans Christoph Ernst von Gagern. The amalgamation of Nassau-Usingen with Nassau-Weilburg in 1806 represented an effective triumph for Marschall von Bieberstein, and incorporation of the territory into the French sponsored Confederation of the Rhine created a buffer state which suited French strategic objectives. For the newly enlarged Duchy of Nassau, there was a measure of security achieved through "French acknowledgement" of the duchy's (qualified) sovereignty.

After The creation of the enlarged Duchy of Nassau in 1806, Marschall von Bieberstein and Hans Christoph Ernst von Gagern headed up the government jointly. There were in effect two "Regierungspräsidenten". While von Gagern focused on foreign policy, von Bieberstein took responsibility for domestic matters. However, Nassau's sovereignty was not unconstrained, and a new edict imperial in 1809 debarred those who had been born on the Left Bank of the Rhine from government service in any state other than France. The edict caught von Gagern who had been born near Worms and he resigned his office in 1809 or 1811 (sources differ) before "retiring" in 1811 to Vienna, where French imperial edicts were of less effect, especially after 1812. After that Marschall von Bieberstein served as sole "Regierungspräsident" till his death in 1834.

=== Reformer ===
Marschall von Bieberstein was still a relatively young man when he took over the government, and his early years in office are marked by a comprehensive strategy of financial, social and economic reform, all designed to create a modern and more unified state. On 1 January 1808 he was able to implement the abolition of serfdom and of "manumission fees" (whereby serfdom levies were compensated by the state), bringing the duchy more closely into line with its former territories on the left bank (which had been part of revolutionary France since 1798). A year later tax privileges for the nobility were diminished. In December 1809 there followed an edict abolishing all "demeaning physical punishments" ("... entehrenden Leibesstrafen"), a striking testimony to governmental respect for the human rights of the prince's subjects in Nassau, more than a century before such an approach became mainstream in much of western Europe. Marschall von Bieberstein's government also changed the rules so as to permit legal cases against the tax authorities. Inter-denominational marriages between Catholics and Lutherans were no longer prohibited. Some years later, in 1817, based on the detailed work of the lawyer-educationalist Carl Ibell, and with the enthusiastic (and very necessary) backing of Marschall von Bieberstein, education provision was removed from church control and interdenominational schooling was introduced. A wide range of administrative reforms included the imposition of "trading tax" ("Gewerbesteuer") on all persons deemed to earn a living through "work and industry" (§ 31 of the Edict on Taxes of February 1809) which included government officers, lawyers, physicians and private tutors. In February 1812 a further edict provided for the abolition of a plethora old direct taxes, among the more eye-catching are of which were "soldier tax", "voluntary grants" ("Verwilligungsgelder"), "road maintenance estimates" ("Chaussee-Schatzung"), "hussar estimates" ("Husaren-Schatzung"), "monthly-money" ("Monatgeld"), knight taxes, "river development money" ("Rheinbaugelder"), "squire money" and "kitchen money".

A national health service was introduced in 1818. Ernst Marschall von Bieberstein participated closely in reforms of the justice system, of financial policy and of the economy over which, as "Regierungspräsident", he presided. To that can be added his introduction of free trade in 1815 and business liberalisation policies introduced in 1819. Up to that point, there can be little doubt as to his commitment to the economic liberalism advocated by eighteenth century enlightenment thinkers.

Marschall von Bieberstein enthusiastically accepted the proposal from Baron vom Stein for a Nassau Constitution, which he implemented, formally, in 1814. Viewed in retrospect it becomes hard to understand just what a radical step (or, for constitutional conservatives, threat) this de facto guarantee of fundamental rights and liberties would have represented, both in 1814 and subsequently. Back in 1806, when Marschall von Stein had been running Nassau's foreign policy, his conciliatory approach towards France had generated tension and, at times, acrimony between himself and Baron vom Stein, at that time a senior Prussian government minister. After the Prussians suffered a crushing military defeat in 1806 at the hands of Napoleon, however, French pressure led eventually to vom Stein's exile from Prussia in 1808. As the fortunes of war turned after 1812 vom Stein was able to move around a little more freely, and by the time the Nassau Constitution was implemented in 1814 relations between vom Stein and Marschall von Bieberstein were much improved, and the two men seem to have worked closely together on the constitution project. Improved relations between the two men proved particularly important at the Congress of Vienna which between November 1814 and June 1815 set the template for Europe after Napoleon. Although vom Stein's ambitions for Europe were, for the most part, ignored or turned down by the leading protagonists at the Congress of Vienna, Stein's support for the Duchy of Nassau was important to Marschall von Bieberstein, who attended the congress of behalf of his prince. Marschall von Bieberstein was able to secure rejection by the congress of the initial wishes of the Prussian delegation that Nassau should simply be annexed to Prussia. In the event, Nassau was able to retain its sovereignty for another half century, till 1866. It was as a mark of gratitude concerning his diplomatic achievements at the Congress of Vienna that in 1815/16 Marschall von Bieberstein was given the moated chateau and surrounding lands at Hahnstätten which today carries the "Bieberstein" name.

=== Restorationist ===
==== About-turn ====
By 1815 the trauma of war and demonisation of Napoleon had done much to discredit political modernisation among a new generation of political leaders and across Europe more widely. The mood at the Congress of Vienna was best exemplified by the cautious conservatism of the Prince Metternich and the Viscount Castlereagh. Among these government heads, Marschall von Bieberstein was exceptional in having already been at the head of a government for almost as long as Frederick William III had been a king and Alexander I had been a tsar. Yet Marschall von Bieberstein remained in charge of the government of Nassau. His principal objective was always the preservation of the duchy. It was evidently in order to facilitate that objective, in 1818/19 he turned away from reform. Ernst Marschall von Bieberstein became a conservative. By backing the so-called "Metternichische Restauration", Marschall von Bieberstein aligned himself with a powerful Austrian Foreign Minister (who after 1821 combined his ministerial responsibilities with the office of Imperial Chancellor). The abrupt change of political focus also reflected a widespread opposition to further reform across Nassau and indeed across the German Confederation more generally.

==== Fear of revolution: invoking Metternich ====
On 23 March 1819 the well-known writer August von Kotzebue was murdered in Mannheim by a liberal-radical theology student called Karl Ludwig Sand. On 1 July 1819 a serious (though ultimately unsuccessful) attempt was made to assassinate Carl Ibell, who by this time had become a senior member of Marschall von Bieberstein's government in Nassau. These were not isolated atrocities. The postwar years were marked by austerity and hunger across Europe. Popular discontent was on the rise and governments were increasingly nervous. Towards the end of July 1819 Marschall von Bieberstein contacted Prince Metternich about his concerns over "demagoguic activities in the Rhine region". He expressed particular concern that Louis I, Grand Duke of Hesse (which bordered Nassau) had not been persuaded to take the necessary "serious measures" against fraterntities of malcontents at the universities in Darmstadt and Giessen. Marschall von Bieberstein had, he assured the prince, already attempted to persuade the Grand Duke of Hesse to take the necessary steps, by exerting pressure through the Prussians, but these attempts had been fruitless. The risks of revolutionaries gaining influence were compounded in the region by the absence of any hardline position on the part of the city authorities in nearby Frankfurt am Main. As long as the trouble makers could find a safe haven in Germany's "free enclaves / cities", the "evil" would persist. The situation in Nassau itself was not, he believed, "quite so dramatic", because political opposition came only from isolated individuals, rather than from the more organised radical fraternities that he identified elsewhere. Nevertheless, action was necessary: neighbouring governments surrounding Nassau were not reacting appropriately to the risks identified.

Despite the collapse of the Holy Roman Empire in 1806, the Austrian Empire remained, in most people's eyes, the most important member of the German Confederation: its continuing leadership role was taken for granted both by Prince Metternich and by Marschall von Bieberstein. Metternich replied promptly, on 31 July 1819, thanking Marschall von Bieberstein for his letter which had, yet again, confirmed him in his own opinion that the member governments of the German confederation needed to work much more closely together. Otherwise the states of Germany would face a downfall which would be of their own making. Metternich was confident that the time for a decision was approaching fast: "A few weeks will be enough to shed light on the future path and to determine whether reason or revolution will prevail". (Note: "Wenige Wochen werden genügen, um in die nächste Zukunft Licht zu werfen und zu bestimmen, ob die Sache der Vernunft oder jene der Revolution siegen wird.")

==== Karlsbad decrees ====
A preliminary meeting was held on 1 August 1819, the day following the date on Metternich's letter to Marschall von Bieberstein, at the health resort of Teplitz in northern Bohemia: the meeting was arranged by Prince Metternich, representing Austria, in order to agree his position with King Frederick William III of Prussia and the Prussian chancellor, von Hardenberg. On 2 August 1819 the eruption of a two month period of communal and antisemitic rioting intensified the perceived need for action against the dangers of a rerun of the French Revolution centred, this time, on German-speaking central Europe. Six weeks of negotiations involving leaders of the German confederation member states now took place at the health resort of Karlsbad in Bohemia, which resulted in the presentartion of the so-called Karlsbad decrees, which were accepted and ratified by the Bundesversammlung (the Frankfurt-based "parliament" of the German confederation) on 20 September 1819. The document closely followed the pre-existing agreement between the Austrian and Prussian leaderships. Reflecting the leaders' deep suspicion of universities as hotbeds of conspiracy and revolution, student fraternities were effectively outlawed. Press restrictions amounting to state censorship were to be enacted. In addition, an "Investigation Commission" was established, mandated to look into the facts relating to the "origin and manifold ramifications of the revolutionary plots and demagogical associations directed against the existing constitution and the internal peace both of the union and of the individual states; of the existence of which plots more or less clear evidence is to be had already, or may be produced in the course of the investigation". Ernst Marschall von Bieberstein, whose correspondence has been preserved, now emerged as an uncompromising backer of the approach envisaged in the Karlsbad decrees, both diplomatically and in his conservative domestic authoritarianism during the ensuing fifteen years.

==== "Domaine dispute" and the aftermath of the July Revolution ====
During the early 1830s Marschall von Bieberstein survived in office during the so-called "domaine dispute" even though the underlying inequities which triggered it were widely seen as a result of deficiencies in his own fiscal reforms fifteen years earlier. Those deficiencies indeed went unaddressed till 1848, long after Marschall von Bieberstein had departed from the scene.) It is, indeed, striking that the revolutionary tide of 1830/31 was far less disruptive of government and of daily life in Nassau than in many of the larger states of the German confederation including, notably, neighboring Hesse where revolutionaries forced the adoption of a newly liberal constitution in 1831. The savage treatment meted out to the aging opposition leader Johann Georg Heber in 1832 indicate that it was not just the pre-emptive impact of Marschall von Bieberstein's reform agenda fifteen years earlier, but also his willingness in the 1830s to adopt a hands-on anti-liberal approach which Prince Metternich himself would surely have endorsed.

==== Sovereignty ====
The central mission to preserve the duchy's sovereignty underpinned many of Marschall von Bieberstein's policies after 1819, including his backing of Metternch's determination to suppress popular nationalism. It was also a reflection of his determination to preserve the duchy's independence to the maximum extent possible that he stubbornly resisted the development of a pan-German customs union, which came into existence in January 1834 but which, following Marschall von Bieberstein's death, Nassau joined only on 10 December 1835. It was (at leasty in part) in order to undermine the development of a pan-German customs union that he travelled to Paris where on 19 September 1833 he agreed a trade deal with France which favoured the export from France of wines and silk products, and the export from Nassau of mineral water.

==== Death ====
Ernst Marschall von Biebertein died in office at the start of 1834, half a year short of what would have been his sixty-fourth birthday. Commentators nevertheless contend that the authoritarian régime that he established after 1819 comfortably outlived him, coming to an end only in 1848.1848/49.

== Evaluation ==
In traditional German historiography scholars have focused on Marschall von Bieberstein's rejection of a customs union and on the reactionary domestic policies that he implemented after 1819. His reforms during the Napoleonic period and his contribution during that period to the modernisation of Nassau were often overlooked, probably because the duchy was annexed by Prussia in 1866, so existed only for sixty years in total.

== Personal ==
On 25 May 1802 Ernst Marschall von Bieberstein married Karoline von Veltheim (1783–1840). She was a daughter of a senior diplomatic official ( "Geheim Legationsrat"), Johann Friedrich von Veltheim (1731–1800) of Destedt (location of the von Veltheim's family home, at which the marriage ceremony took place). It is known that the couple had (at least) eleven children (four sons and seven daughter) of whom some are listed here:

- Adolfine (1803-?) who in 1828 married Heinrich Friedrich Carl von Rettberg (?–1844), an army officer ("Herzöglich nassauischer Oberst und Flügeladjutant")
- Luise Caroline (1804–1884) who in 1827 married Friedrich von Wintzingerode (1799–1870)
- Auguste Therese(1805–1883) who in 1830 married Friedrich Ernst Ludwig Heinrich von und zu Gilsa (1799–1859), a government officer ("Herzöglich nassauischer Kammerherr und Oberjägermeister")
- Friedrich Wilhelm (1806–1865), a land owner, government officer and member of parliament (" Nassauischer Kammerherr, Domänenrat und Landtagsabgeordneter")
- Dorothea Natalie (1808–1888) who in 1834, following the death two years earlier of his first wife, her younger sister, married the politician Emil August von Dungern (1802–1862)
- Charlotte Friederike (1810–1832) who in 1829 married the politician Emil August von Dungern (1802–1862)
- Ernst August Friedrich Hans (1816–1860), government officer and member of parliament ("Nassauischer Kammerherr, Domänenrat und Landtagsabgeordneter")
- Marie Luise (1819–1904) who in 1846 married Adolf Marschall von Bieberstein (1806–1891), a government officer and politician who was also her first cousin. (They shared two of their four grandparents in common.) Their three children nevertheless appear to have lived long and conventionally healthy lives.
