= William Winter =

William or Bill Winter may refer to:

- Bill Winter (New York Giants) (born 1940), American football player; played for the New York Giants (1962–1964)
- Bill Winter (British Army officer) (William Arthur Winter, 1913–2004), British soldier
- Bill Winter (Marshall Thundering Herd) (born 1943), American football player
- William Winter (author) (1836–1917), American drama critic and author
- William Winter (chess player) (1898–1955), British chess player
- William Winter (cricketer) (1843–1905), English cricketer
- William F. Winter (1923–2020), American politician; governor of Mississippi
- W. Christopher Winter (born 1972), sleep medicine specialist and neurologist
- William H. Winter (1819–1879), American explorer and author
- William J. Winter (born 1930), Roman Catholic auxiliary bishop of Pittsburgh
- William Winter-Irving (1840–1901), born William Irving Winter, Australian politician

== See also ==
- William Wynter (1519–1589), English admiral
- William Winter Payne (1807–1874), U.S. Representative from Alabama
