= Huncovce =

Village and Municipality in Prešov Region, Slovakia

- Municipality
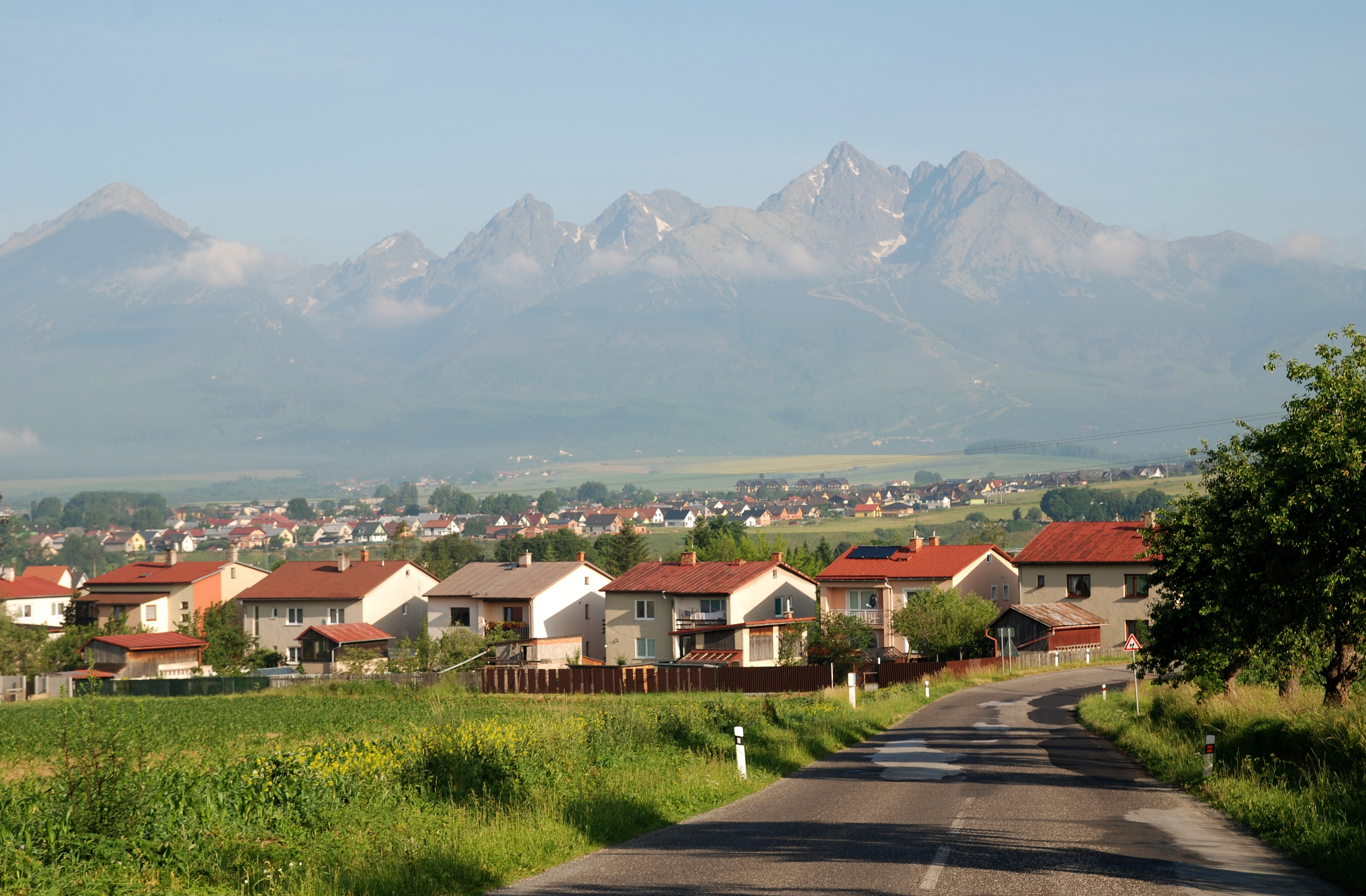

- Flag

- Location of Huncovce in the Prešov Region Location of Huncovce in Slovakia
- Coordinates: 49.12°N 20.38°E
- Country: Slovakia
- Region: Prešov Region
- District: Kežmarok District
- First mentioned: 1257

Area
  - Total: 13.26 km^{2} (5.12 sq mi)
- Elevation: 641 m (2,103 ft)

Population (2025)
  - Total: 3,251
- Time zone: UTC+1 (CET)
  - Summer (DST): UTC+2 (CEST)
- Postal code: 599 2
- Area code: +421 52
- Vehicle registration plate (until 2022): KK
- Website: www.huncovce.sk

Huncovce (Slovak pronunciation: [ˈɦuntsɔwtse]; Hungarian: Hunfalva, til 1902: Hunfalu, German: Hunsdorf, Hunszdorf, Hundsdorf in der Zips, Hunzdorf, Hunesdorf, Rusyn: Гунцовце, Yiddish: אונסדאָרףֿ Unsdorf, Hebrew: אונסדורף, Latin: Villa Canis, Hunisvilla) is a village and municipality in Kežmarok District in the Prešov Region of north Slovakia.

== Geography ==
The municipality lies at an altitude of 641 metres (2,103 ft) and covers an area of 13.26 km^{2} (5.12 sq mi) (2025).

== History ==
Huncovce was first mentioned in 1257 as a farming settlement, the property of Hungarian noblemen. German craftsmen and lumberjacks later settled there, and the town received rights to become a city. At the beginning of the 19th century, about half of the residents were Jews, and the rest Christian Germans and Slovaks, who were generally either Lutheran or Catholic. The village belonged to a German language island. Before the establishment of independent Czechoslovakia in 1918, Huncovce was part of Szepes County within the Kingdom of Hungary. From 1939 to 1945, it was part of the Slovak Republic. On 28 January 1945, the Red Army dislodged the Wehrmacht from Huncovce in the course of the Western Carpathian offensive and it was once again part of Czechoslovakia. The German population was expelled in 1945.

=== Jewish community ===
The first Jews to reside in Huncovce were from Moravia, settling there in the latter half of the 16th century. Later, survivors of the Khmelnitsky pogroms of 1648-1649 arrived, essentially as refugees. Jewish settlement in the region was technically prohibited by law, and therefore nearly all Jews in the Spis region resided in or around Huncovce during this period. The community continued to grow through the 18th and into the 19th century; though it remained small with only 30 families in the 18th century, by 1828 it had grown to 939 members (though this did include Jews from several other nearby settlements and villages).

In the 19th century, Huncovce became an important regional centre of Torah learning, and a renowned yeshiva, where in the mid-century up to 350 boys studied, was built and led by Rabbi Yechezkel Wolf Segel.

In the interbellum period, the Jewish population had begun to dwindle; by 1919, there were fewer than 275 Jews remaining (the entire community, including non-Jews, numbered less than 500 at this time). During this period, most of the Jews made a living in commerce and small business (e.g., grocers and butchers), and some tradesmen (e.g., tailors and carpenters).

WWII and the Holocaust essentially put an end to Jewish life in Huncovce. On March 14 and 15, 1939, many of the German residents of the village (who had joined Nazi organizations) rounded up about 200 Jews and drove them out of the village to the no-man's land on the Slovak-Hungarian border. They were held without shelter and in cramped and difficult conditions for two weeks, after which they were allowed to return to their homes. Two years later, the Jews' businesses were expropriated from them by Nazis and collaborators, with the young men sent to perform forced labour. Deportations began in 1942, with most Jews sent to concentration camps and extermination camps, though some were sent to Lublin-area ghettoes. Some hid in the forests, alone or with Slovaks – some of these were able to return to the village after the war, but the Jewish community could not rebuild its social structure, and its community buildings were damaged.

Today no Jewish community exists, but the local government declared the remaining cemetery a protected historical site, and the yeshiva building still stands.

== Population ==
Population statistic (10 years)
Year	1995	2005	2015	2025
Count	1985	2444	3057	3251
Difference		+23.12%	+25.08%	+6.34%

Population statistic
Year	2024	2025
Count	3209	3251
Difference		+1.30%

It has a population of 3251 people (31 December 2025).

=== Ethnicity ===
Census 2021 (1+ %)
Ethnicity	Number	Fraction
Slovak	2891	94.63%
Romani	1025	33.55%
Not found out	119	3.89%
Total	3055	

In year 2021 was 3055 people by ethnicity 2891 as Slovak, 1025 as Romani, 119 as Not found out, 8 as Other, 7 as Rusyn, 4 as Polish, 4 as German, 3 as Czech, 3 as Russian, 1 as Italian, 1 as Romanian, 1 as Austrian and 1 as Hungarian.

Note on population: The difference values of population numbers in the table "Population statistic" and in the sections "Ethnicity" & "Religion" is caused by the use of various statistical methods.

=== Religion ===
Census 2021 (1+ %)
Religion	Number	Fraction
Roman Catholic Church	2096	68.61%
None	802	26.25%
Not found out	54	1.77%
Greek Catholic Church	36	1.18%
Evangelical Church	34	1.11%
Total	3055	

In year 2021 was 3055 people by religion 2096 from Roman Catholic Church, 802 from None, 54 from Not found out, 36 from Greek Catholic Church, 34 from Evangelical Church, 11 from Christian Congregations in Slovakia, 5 from Eastern Orthodox Church, 5 from Jehovah's Witnesses, 3 from Buddhism, 2 from Other and not ascertained christian church, 2 from Ad hoc movements, 1 from Jewish community, 1 from Islam, 1 from Other, 1 from Hinduism and 1 from Apostolic Church.

== People ==
- David Friesenhausen (1750, Friesenhausen - 1828, Gyulafehérvár/Alba Iulia), a Jewish Bavarian-Hungarian Talmudist, scientist, mathematician, Hebrew-language writer; lived here
- Solomon Winter (Hungarian: Winter Salamon; 1778, ?, in the Szepes - ), Jewish Hungarian philanthropist; lived and died here

== See also ==
- List of municipalities and towns in Slovakia

== Genealogical resources ==
The records for genealogical research are available at the state archive "Statny Archiv in Levoca, Slovakia"

- Roman Catholic church records (births/marriages/deaths): 1675-1899 (parish A)
- Lutheran church records (births/marriages/deaths): 1784-1944 (parish B)
