= Pauline von Koudelka-Schmerling =

Austrian flower painter (1806–1840)

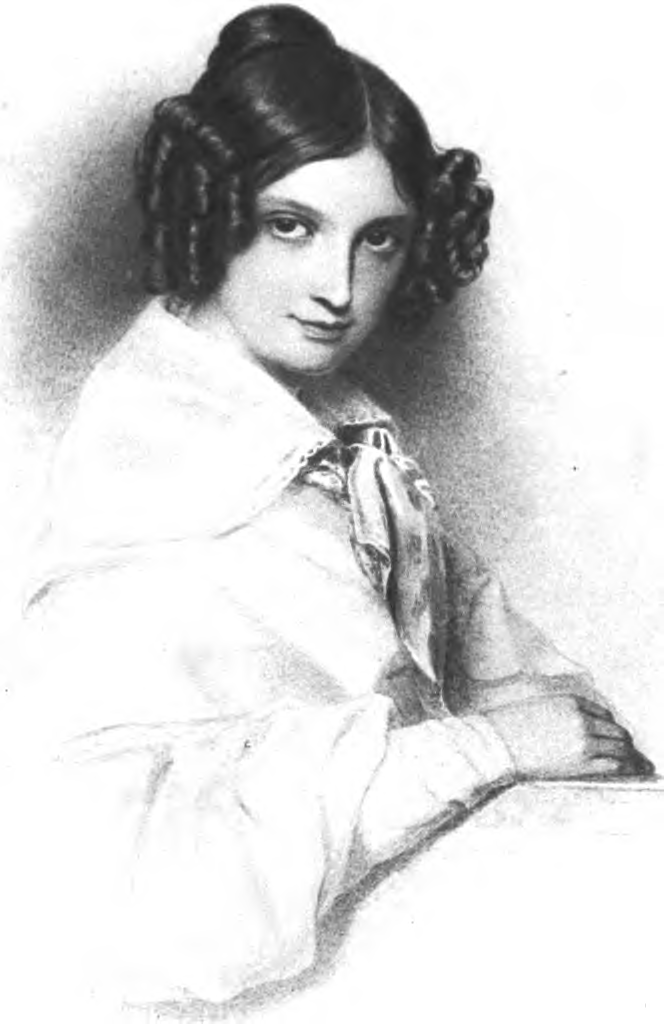
- Born: 8 September 1806; Vienna
- Died: 30 July 1840 (aged 33); Vienna
- Resting place: Hietzing Cemetery
- Occupation: Painter
- Spouse(s): Anton von Schmerling
- Parent(s): Joseph von Koudelka

Baroness Pauline von Koudelka-Schmerling (8 September 1806 – 30 July 1840) was an Austrian flower painter. She has been called the most important flower painter of the Vormärz period.

Pauline Freiin von Koudelka was born on 8 September 1806 in Vienna, capital of the Austrian Empire. She was the daughter of Lieutenant Field Marshal Joseph Freiherr von Koudelka and Katharina Freiin Wetzlar von Blankenstern. Her father was an accomplished artist in retirement and encouraged her artistic talents. She trained under Franz Xaver Petter in Vienna and Cornelis van Spaedonck, Pierre Joseph Redouté and Jan Frans van Dael in Paris. Her flower paintings were often of arrangements on flat surfaces and adorning images of Catholic saints or Madonnas.

In 1835, she married Austrian statesman Anton Ritter von Schmerling. She died on 30 July 1840 in Ober-St. Veit, Vienna.

== Gallery ==
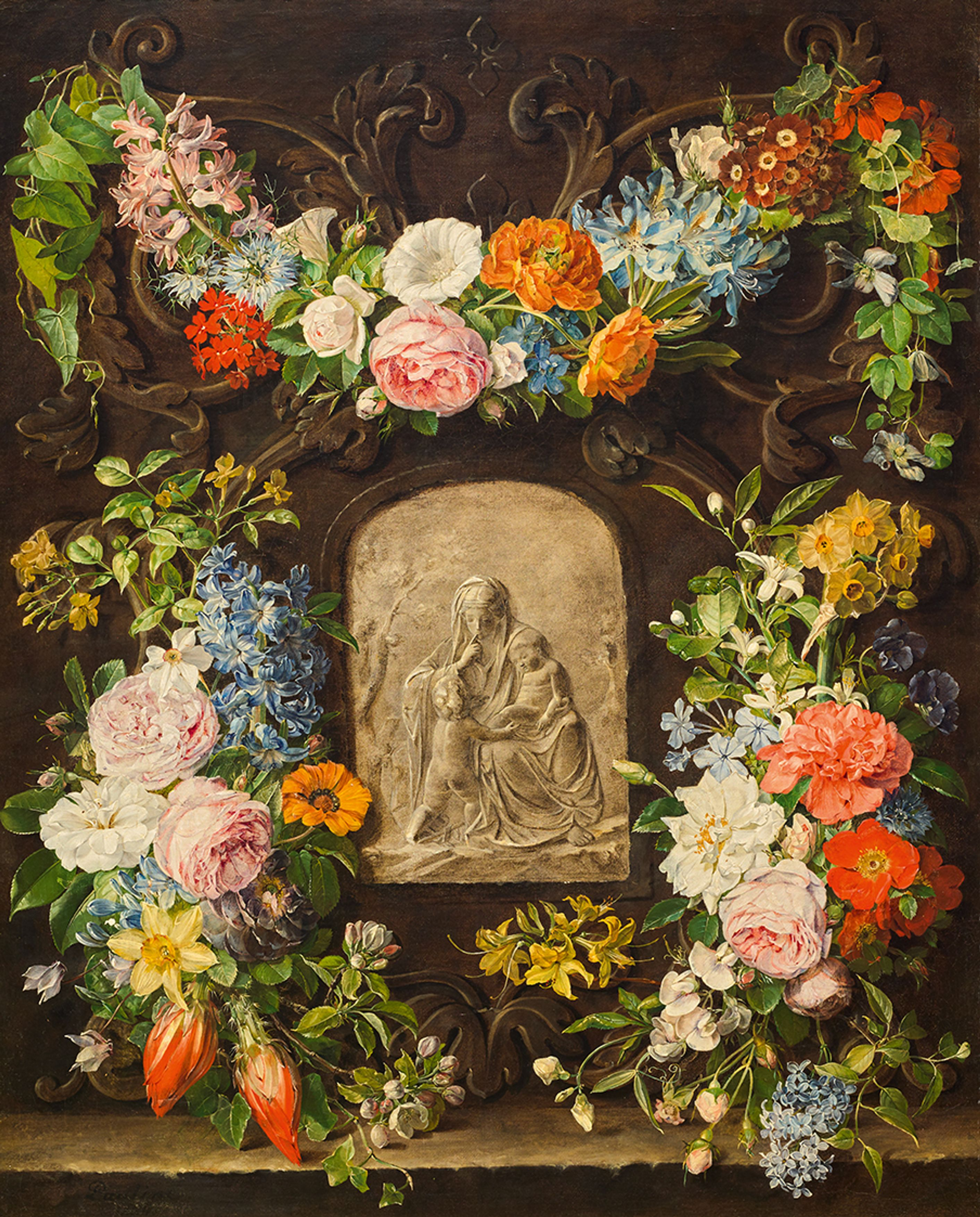

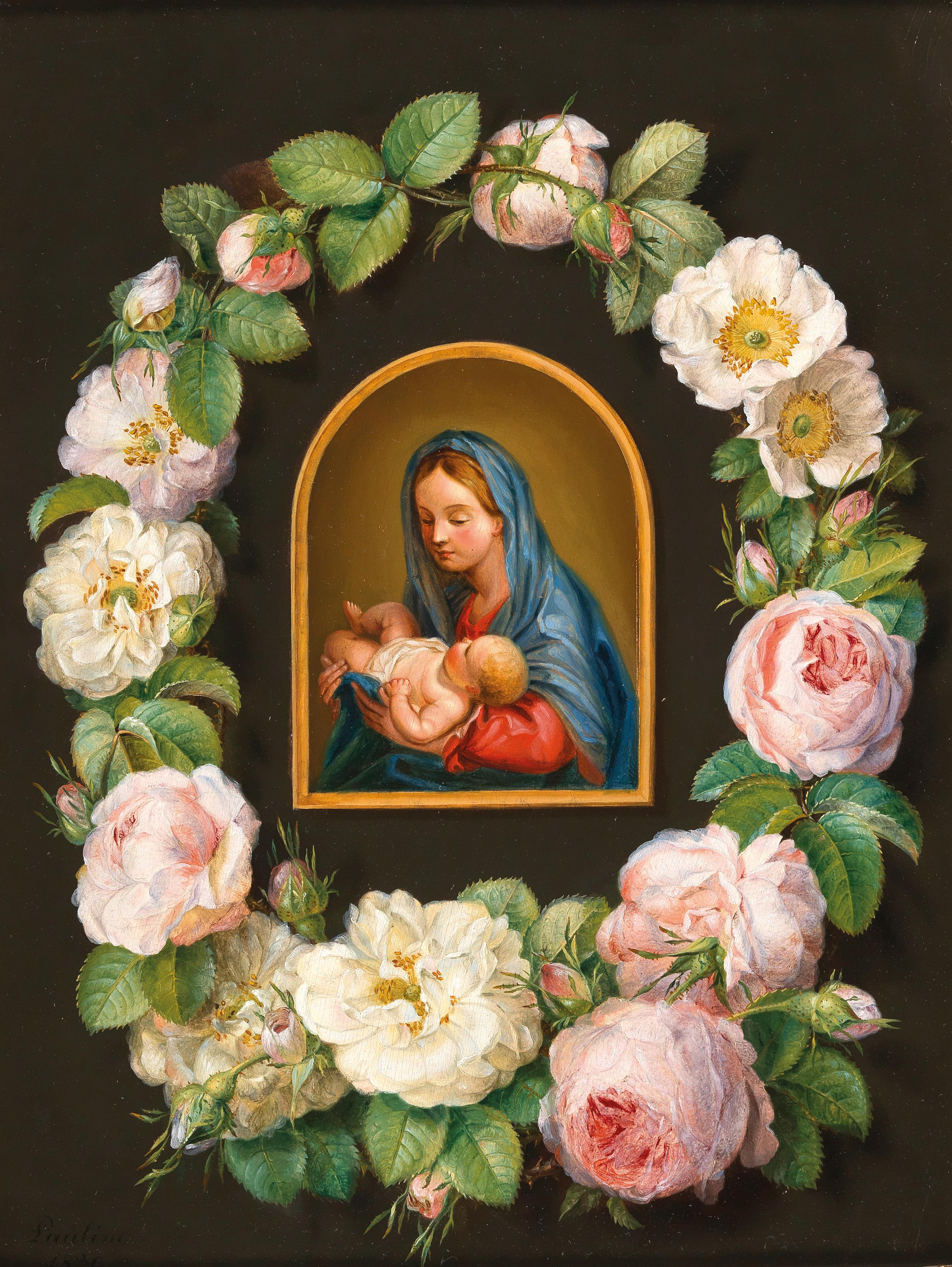

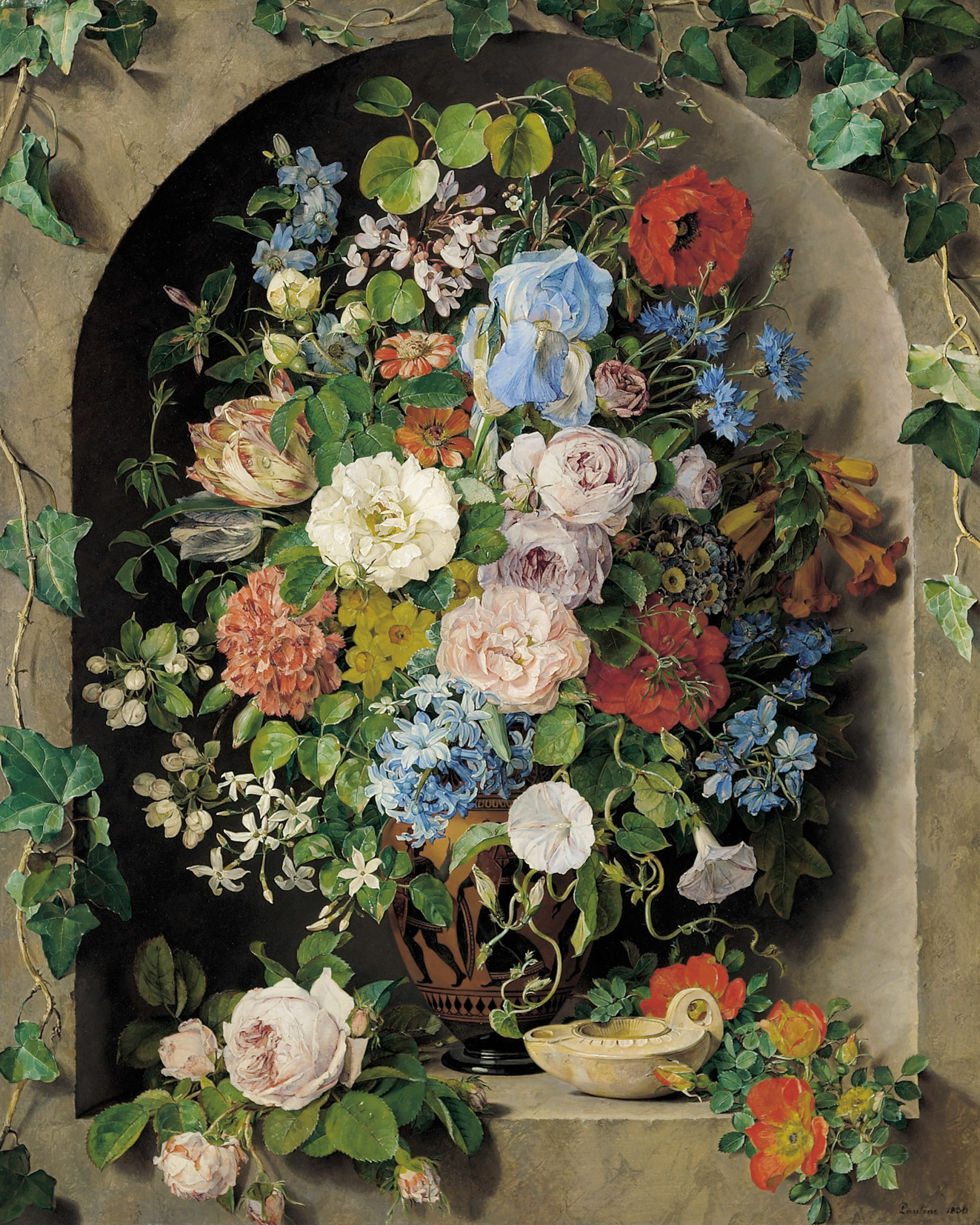

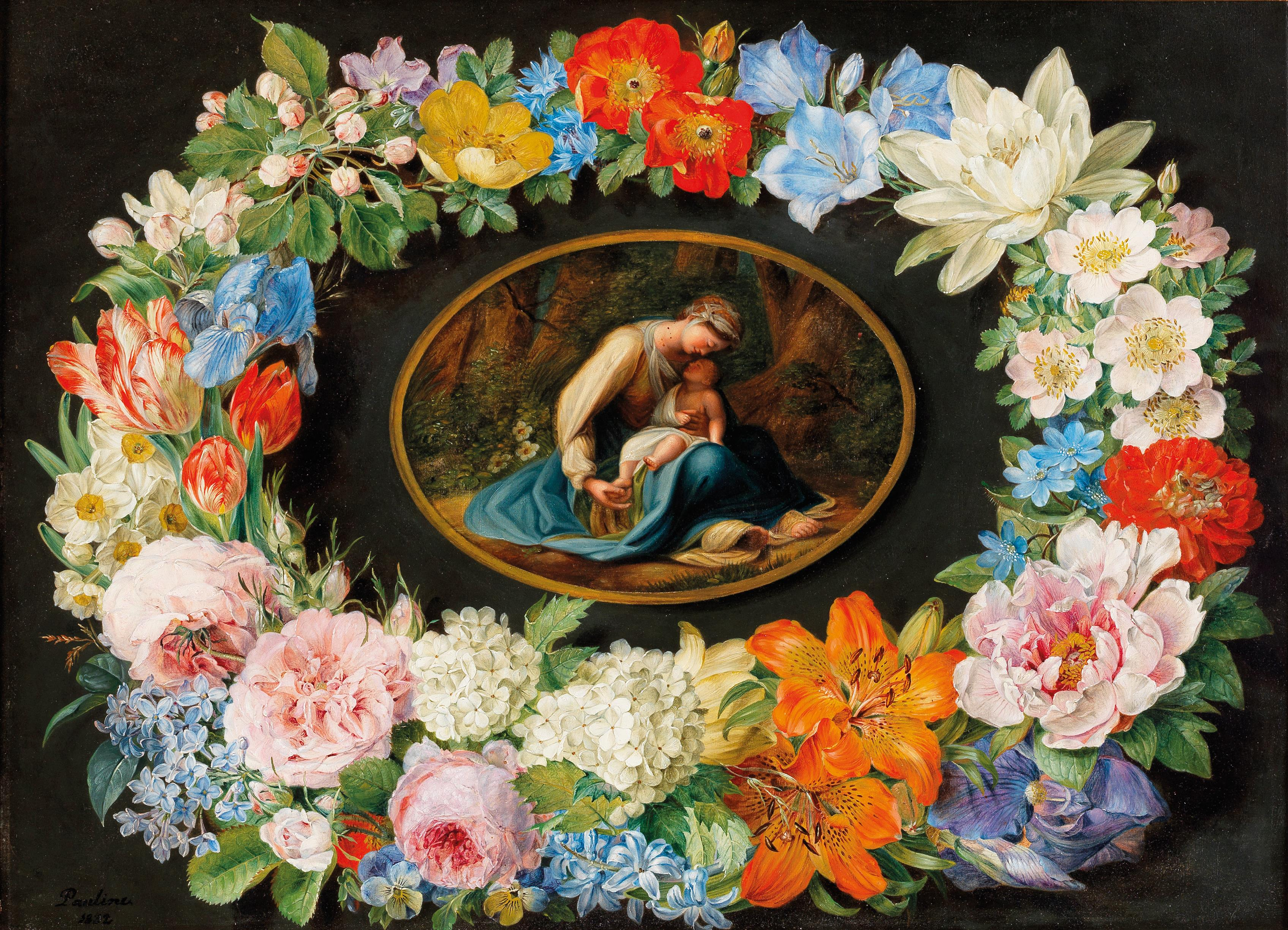
