= Heinrich von Gagern =

President of the Frankfurt Parliament (1799–1880)

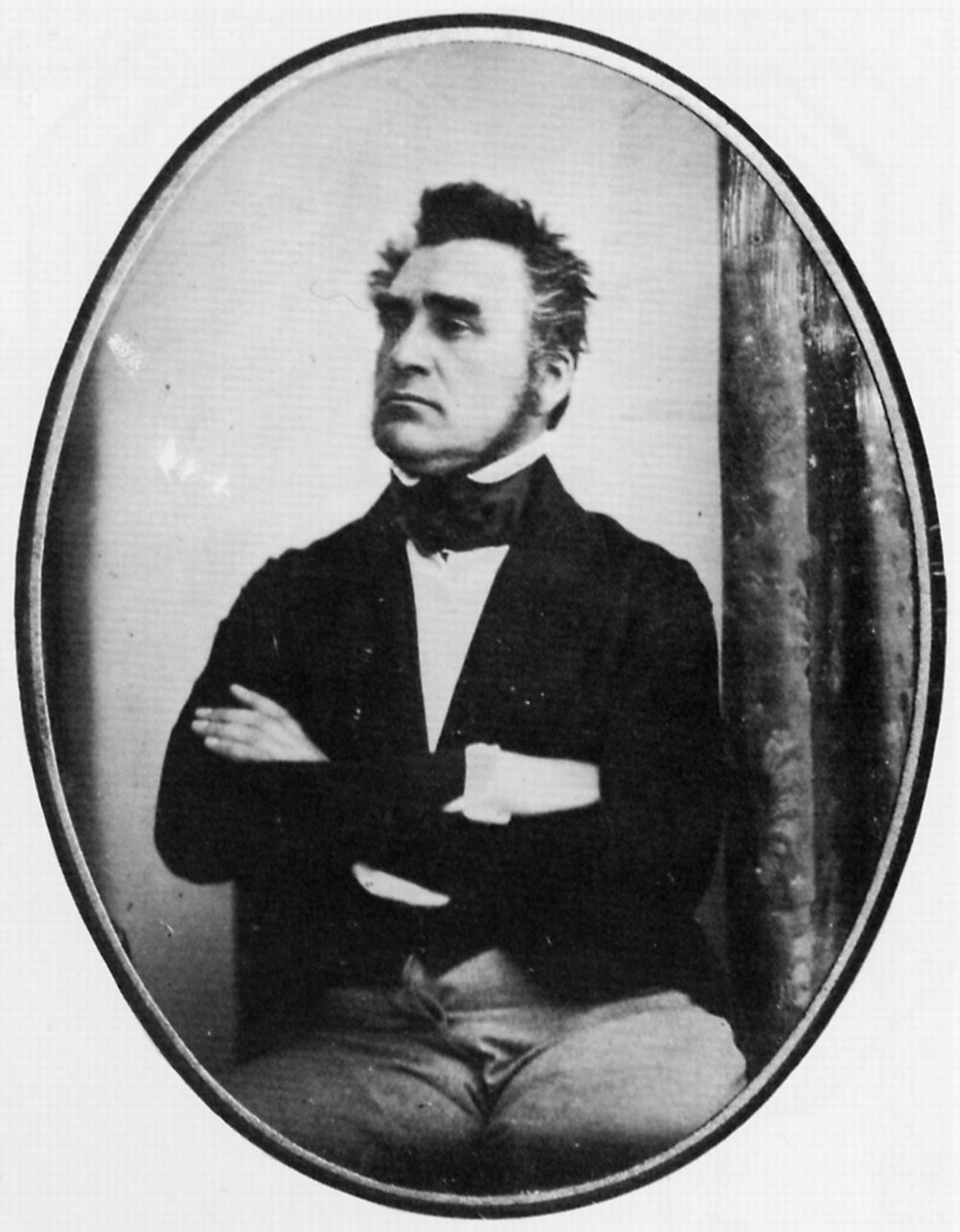
Heinrich von Gagern in 1848

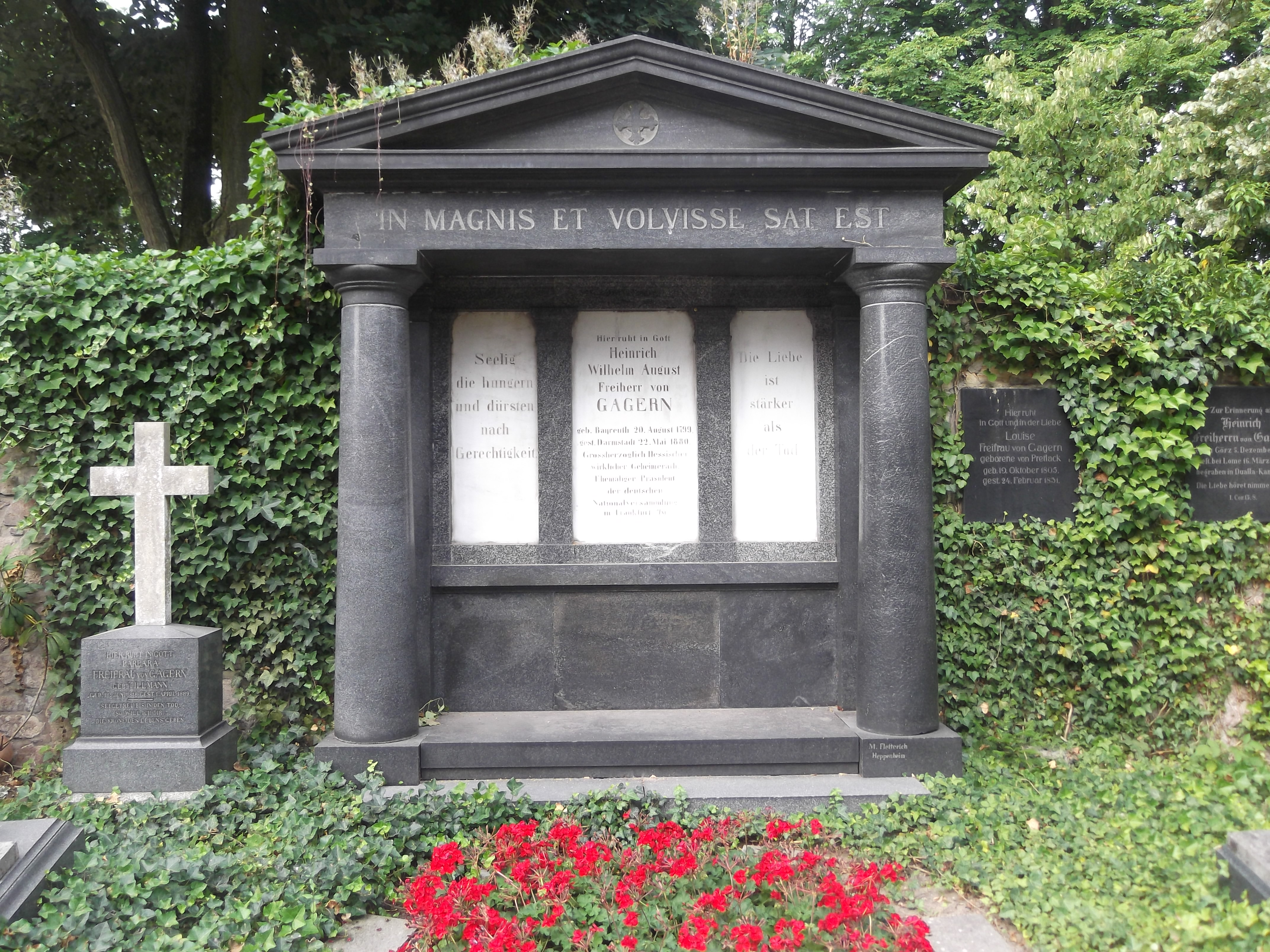
Tomb of Heinrich von Gagern in the "Alter Friedhof" in Darmstadt (Germany)

Heinrich Wilhelm August Freiherr von Gagern (20 August 1799 – 22 May 1880) was a statesman who argued for the unification of Germany.

== Early career ==
The third son of Hans Christoph Ernst, Baron von Gagern, a liberal statesman from Nassau, Heinrich von Gagern was born at Bayreuth, educated at the military academy at Munich and, as an officer in the service of the duke of Nassau, fought at Waterloo.

Leaving the service after the war, he studied jurisprudence at Heidelberg, Göttingen and Jena, where he became a member of the Urburschenschaft. In 1819, he went for a while to Geneva to complete his studies. In 1821 he began his official career as a lawyer in the grand-duchy of Hesse, and in 1832 was elected to the second chamber. Already at the universities he had proclaimed his Liberal sympathies as a member of the Burschenschaft, and he now threw himself into open opposition to the unconstitutional spirit of the Hessian government, an attitude which led to his dismissal from the state service in 1833. Henceforth he lived in comparative tiny a farm rented by his father at Monsheim, and occasionally publishing criticisms of public affairs, until the French revolution of 1848 and its echoes in Germany recalled him to active political life. For a short while he was at the head of the new Hessian administration; but his ambition was to share in the creation of a united Germany.

== The rise and fall of the 1848 Frankfurt Parliament ==
At the Heidelberg meeting and the preliminary convention (Vorparlament) of Frankfurt he deeply impressed the assemblies with the breadth and moderation of his views; with the result that when the German national parliament met (18 May), he was elected its first president. His influence was at first paramount, both with the Unionist party and with the more moderate elements of the Left, and it was he who was mainly instrumental in imposing the principle of a united empire with a common parliament, and in carrying the election of the Archduke John as regent. With the growing split between the Great Germans (Grossdeutschen), who wished the new empire to include the Austrian provinces, and the Little Germans (Kleindeutschen), who realized that German unity could only be attained by excluding them, his position was shaken.

On 11 December, when Schmerling and the Austrian members had left the cabinet, Gagern became head of the imperial ministry, and on 18 December he introduced a program (known as the Gagernsche Program) according to which Austria was to be excluded from the new federal state, but bound to it by a treaty of union. After a severe struggle this proposal was accepted; but the academic discussion on the constitution continued for weary months, and on 20 May, realizing the hopelessness of coming to terms with the ultra-democrats, Gagern and his friends resigned.

== Later career ==
Later on he attempted to influence the Prussian Northern Union in the direction of the national policy, and he took part in the sessions of the Erfurt parliament; but, soon, realizing the hopelessness of any good results from the vacillating policy of Prussia, he retired from the contest, and, as a major in the service of the Schleswig-Holstein government, took part in the First Schleswig War of 1850. After the war he retired into private life at Heidelberg. In 1862, misled by the constitutional tendency of Austrian politics, he publicly declared in favor of the Great German party. In 1864 he went as Hessian envoy to Vienna, retiring in 1872 when the post was abolished. He died at Darmstadt in 1880.

| Preceded by Anton von Schmerling | Minister President of the German Empire; 15 December 1848 – 20 May 1849 | Succeeded by Otto von Bismarck as Chancellor of the North German Confederation (1867) |
