= David Friesenhausen =

German-Hungarian astronomer (1756–1828)

David ben Meir Cohen Friesenhausen (1756–1828) was a German-Hungarian astronomer, maskil, mathematician, and rabbi. Friesenhausen was one of the first proponents of Torah im Derech Eretz, a philosophy of Orthodox Judaism that formalizes a relationship between traditionally observant Judaism and the modern world. He proposed a dual curriculum of Jewish and secular studies for all rabbinic candidates, a radically innovative idea at that time. Friesenhausen wrote Mosedot Tebel and Kelil Heshbon. In the former, Friesenhausen writes in support of the Copernican heliocentrism, one of the first Jews to do so.

== Early life ==
In 1756, David Friesenhausen was born in Friesenhausen, a small community in southern Germany, 100 kilometres (60 mi) northeast of Frankfurt. In 1783, Friesenhausen married, but was divorced four years later. For the first 30 years of his life, Friesenhausen dedicated himself exclusively Torah study. His teachers included Joseph Steinhardt at Fürth and Moses Sofer of Pressburg. The latter attested that Friesenhausen was one of the outstanding students in his yeshiva. In 1786, Friesenhausen began immersing himself in various secular subjects, including math, astronomy, and philosophy.

== Berlin ==
In 1788, Friesenhausen moved to Berlin where he lived for the next eight years and was supported by Benjamin Halberstat. Berlin at that time was the center of the haskala movement (Jewish Enlightenment). Despite his involvement in secular subjects, Friesenhausen continued to study Torah intensively. In 1796, Friesenhausen published his first book, Kelil Heshbon a Hebrew language manual on algebra and trigonometry. Thereafter, Friesenhausen left Berlin to travel throughout Europe for the dual purpose of selling his newly published book and to attain advance subscriptions for planned book, Mosodot Tevel.

== Huncovce ==
Around 1800, Friesenhausen moved to Huncovce (then Hungary, now Slovakia) in the Carpathian Mountains. He was appointed dayyan (judge) and also worked as a merchant. According to Meir Gilon in R. David Friesenhausen: Between the Poles of Haskalah and Hasidut, Friesenhausen moved from Berlin to its polar opposite Huncovce because he grew disenchanted with the haskala movement in Berlin who in general rejected the divine authorship of the Torah and belief in God. Friesenhausen married again in Huncovce.

In 1806, having become unhappy with the isolation of Huncovce, Friesenhausen moved to Pest. In Pest, Friesenhausen began to advocate for government oversighted rabbinical seminaries in Hungary, Galicia, and the Czech lands. Under Friesenhausen's proposal only graduates of these seminaries would be appointed to the rabbinate. The seminaries would mandate a curriculum of primarily Talmud, but also of Bible, humanities, and sciences, and gym. Friesenhausen was the first to make such a proposal and submitted his plan to the Archduke Joseph, Palatine of Hungary. On 26 July 1806 Friesenhausen met with Archduke Joseph, who promised to bring the matter to his brother Francis II, Holy Roman Emperor. The Hungarian rabbinate were unhappy with Friesenhausen's unilateral activities. They accused of him being a dangerous reformer and of undermining their position. Friesenhausen was unable to attain a rabbinic position in Pest so he moved back to Huncovce.

In 1813, after some deliberation, the government declined the proposal. The stated reasons were that: (1) The Jews did not have enough funds for the schools especially since the tolerance tax was increased; (2) the policy of the government was to assimilate the Jews; and (3) Jews were able to attend Christian schools.

== Sátoraljaújhely ==
Friesenhausen had difficulties making a reasonable income in Huncovce. In 1808, Friesenhausen moved to Sátoraljaújhely (Ujhely), Hungary, where he served as dayyan in the rabbinic court of Moses Teitelbaum. Friesenhausen was unhappy in Sátoraljaújhely, mainly due to his dislike of Moses Teitelbaum.

Friesenhausen wrote Mosedot Tebel, a treatise on astronomy, in which he explains the Copernican heliocentrism. Mosedot Tebel also contains a proof for the eleventh axiom of Euclid, and a 74-page ethical Will & Testament to his children. In 1816, Friesenhausen left Sátoraljaújhely in order to secure financing for the publication of his book, eventually getting it published in Vienna in 1820.

== Later life ==
After publishing Mosedot Tebel, Friesenhausen retired and spent his remaining years in Alba Iulia with his son Meir, a physician. David died on 23 March 1828.
