= Max von Gagern =

German liberal politician

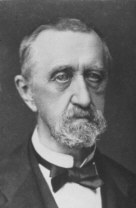
Max von Gagern.

Max von Gagern (b. Weilburg (in Nassau), Germany, 25 March 1810; died Vienna, 17 October 1889) was a German liberal politician.

== Early life ==
He was the son of Hans Christoph von Gagern, minister of state in Nassau; he attended the gymnasiums at Kreuznach, Mannheim, and Weilburg, and studied law from 1826 at Heidelberg, Utrecht, and Göttingen. After a stay in Paris he received in 1829 a position in the cabinet of William I, King of the Netherlands. At the outbreak of the Belgian Revolution (1830) he joined the Dutch army as a volunteer and took part in the war against Belgium. In 1833 he retired from the service of the Netherlands, married Franzina Lambert, of The Hague, and took up historical studies in order to fit himself for the position of Privatdozent at Bonn University. He was at Bonn during the years 1837-40. In 1837, although still a Protestant, he sided with the imprisoned Archbishop of Cologne, Droste-Vischering, and thus lost the favour of the Prussian Government. In 1840 he was appointed ministerial successor with the title of Legationsrat by the Duke of Nassau.

On 28 August 1843, he joined the Roman Catholic Church. Although naturally very religious he had grown indifferent to religion during his student life and his residence in the Netherlands. Acquaintance with Catholics and with the historian Georg Friedrich von Böhmer, who was friendly to Catholicism, awakened in him respect and veneration for the Church. The chief sources of his Catholic knowledge were, as he himself says, the Imitation of Christ by Thomas à Kempis, the study of Johann Möhler's Symbolik, and the New Testament. His conversion did not affect the favour of the Duke of Nassau who appointed him in 1844 extraordinary envoy to the Courts of the Netherlands and Belgium.

== 1848 Revolution ==
Gagern's labours during the revolutionary year of 1848 extended far beyond his native state. He was the centre of the efforts that aimed to mediate between the Government and the people and to reorganize the German Confederation as a nation. According to the schemes Prussia was to have the supreme direction of German affairs. With this end in view Gagern negotiated with the Governments of Southern Germany and with Prussia. He then took part in the debates of the preliminary parliament in Frankfurt, and at the same time was one of the seventeen confidential agents of the governments who were to aid the parliament of the Confederation in revising the constitution.

He was chosen president of this committee of seventeen, but was not as prominent at the Frankfurt Parliament as his brother Heinrich whom he supported. He joined the Catholic Club. On 5 August 1848, he was made under-secretary for foreign affairs in the imperial ministry which Archduke Johann, as administrator of the empire, had temporarily formed. In the question as to the constitution of Germany he worked with his brother for "little Germany" (exclusion of Austria from Germany, union of Germany under a Prussian empire). When the King of Prussia declined the imperial crown offered to him and the Parliament of Frankfurt approached dissolution, Von Gagern and his party withdrew from the assembly.

== Later life ==
In 1850 Gagern was again in the service of the State of Nassau, being employed as an upper ministerial clerk. He had, however, lost the confidence of the duke by his "Little Germany" policy, and influential circles looked upon the Catholic Church unfavourably. In 1854, after having been conspicuously slighted, he retired from the state service. His efforts to obtain a historical professorship at Bonn failed, allegedly owing to the dislike of Protestants for converts to Catholicism. During the years 1855-73 he was in the service of Austria, first as head clerk in a ministerial department, then as departmental head in the mercantile political division of the ministry of foreign affairs. From 1860 he had also charge of the department of the press for foreign affairs, a position which gave him a deep insight into Austrian policy without, however, leading to an independent position. In 1881, eight years after his retirement on a pension, Emperor Franz Joseph I made him a life member of the upper house of the imperial Austrian Parliament.
