= John Winter (cricketer) =

English cricketer

John Arundell Winter (28 July 1851 – 15 May 1914) was an English cricketer who played first-class cricket for Somerset County Cricket Club in 1884. He was born at Ash Priors, Taunton, Somerset and he died at Hampton Wick, Middlesex.

Winter played as a lower-order batsman and an occasional bowler in amateur cricket matches in Somerset in the 1870s, but made only one appearance for the Somerset first-class county side, the first game of the 1884 season against Kent, in which he scored 4 and 0, took one catch and did not bowl.

Earlier he had had a military career, joining the 70th Foot regiment as a lieutenant in 1871. He later served as an officer in the West Somerset Yeomanry, from which he retired in 1892 with the honorary rank of major; the father of another Somerset cricketer, Walter Shuldham, was promoted to replace him when he retired.
