= John Winter =

John Winter may refer to:

- John Winter (architect) (1930–2012), English architect
- John Winter (athlete) (1924–2007), Australian high jumper
- John Winter (cricketer) (1851–1914), English cricketer
- John Winter (Newfoundland politician) (1806–1891), English-born physician and political figure in Newfoundland
- John Winter (producer) (born 1956), Australian producer of Rabbit-Proof Fence
- John Winter (Royalist) (c. 1600–1676), English landowner, ironmaster and participant in the English Civil War
- John Winter (Wyoming politician), member of the Wyoming House of Representatives
- John B. Winter, member of the Minnesota House of Representatives
- John Charles Winter (1923–2012), cathedral organist
- John Strange Winter (1856–1911), pen name of English novelist Henrietta Eliza Vaughan Stannard
- Louis Krages (1949–2001), also known as "John Winter", German race car driver and businessman
- John Wynter (1555–1638), also known as "John Winter", English sailor

== See also ==
- Jonathan Winter (born 1971), New Zealand Maori Olympic backstroke swimmer
- Johnny Winter (1944–2014), John Dawson Winter III, American blues guitarist
- John D. Winters (1916–1997), American historian at Louisiana Tech University
- Jonathan Winters (1925–2013), American comedic actor
- Jock Winter (1803–1875), nickname of John Winter, Australian pastoralist
