= Cliff Winter =

English footballer

Personal information
- Full name: Clifford Winter
- Date of birth: 1884
- Place of birth: Gateshead, England
- Date of death: 27 October 1918 (aged 33–34)
- Place of death: Cambrai, France
- Position: Inside left

Senior career*
Years	Team	Apps	(Gls)
1904–1905	Newcastle United	0	(0)
1905	Gainsborough Trinity	6	(1)
- South Shields Adelaide
- Byker East End
- * Club domestic league appearances and goals

Clifford Winter (1884 – 27 October 1918) was a professional footballer who played as an inside left in the Football League for Gainsborough Trinity.

== Personal life ==
Winter served as a corporal in the Cameronians (Scottish Rifles) during the First World War and died of wounds at the Battle of Cambrai on 27 October 1918. He is buried in Rocquigny-Equancourt Road British Cemetery, Manancourt.
