= Bill Winter (British Army officer) =

British Army officer (1913–2004)

William Arthur Winter
- Born: 17 September 1913; Chaubatia, Uttaranchal, India
- Died: 4 December 2004 (aged 91); Ash Vale, Surrey, United Kingdom
- Burial place: Cremated, Aldershot Crematorium
- Military career
- Allegiance: United Kingdom
- Branch: British Army
- Rank: Major
- Nickname: "Bill"
- Service number: 420660
- Unit: Royal Army Medical Corps
- Conflicts: World War II
- Awards: Distinguished Conduct Medal
- Other work: Chairman of Ash Parish Council

William Arthur Winter DCM (17 September 1913 – 4 December 2004) was a British soldier in the Royal Army Medical Corps (RAMC) who received the Distinguished Conduct Medal while serving in Burma during the Second World War.

== Early life ==
Winter was born to Robert Winter and Ethel Arthurene Wilton on 17 September 1913 in Chaubatia, Uttaranchal, India. He married Bettie South (Phyllis Hall) in December 1941 when he was 28, shortly after he was posted to the Far East during the Second World War and did then not see Bettie for over four years until the war ended in 1945.

== Service ==
Winter joined the Army in 1936, first serving in Malta. During the Second World War Winter experienced his first action in Norway in 1940.

In December 1944, Winter was an acting Warrant Officer class 1 holding an appointment as Regimental sergeant major in the RAMC. During the crossing of the Chindwin River Winter was responsible for ensuring medical supplies for 2nd Infantry Division were moved across the river and for the evacuation of casualties. Winter's citation for the Distinguished Conduct Medal states that he "swam across the Irrawaddy under machine gun fire to organise the collection of casualties".

The citation notes that during the enemy's engagement which lasted over 72 hours Winter "ceaselessly toured the forward advanced dressing stations" in conditions that were described as "intense shell fire" ensuring the evacuation of many casualties. It is said that the treatment Winter gave to the casualties and the superb condition they arrived at hospital saved countless lives.

Winter continued to serve in the RAMC after the war and in 1952 was commissioned and immediately promoted to Lieutenant in the non medical branch of the RAMC.

Winter retired from the army in 1967 with the rank of Major.

== Later life ==
After returning from the war, Winter had two children and completed numerous tours across seas taking his family with him before finally settling down to live in Ash Vale, Surrey where he was chairman of the parish council between 1983 and 1987.

After retirement, Winter became the Royal Army Medical Corps' first regimental secretary.

== Notable relative ==
Winter's father Robert Winter also won the DCM when he was a Company Sergeant Major in the Prince of Wales's Leinster Regiment during the First World War. Robert then went on to win the Military Medal and after the war became a commissioner in the Nigerian Police. It is believed that Robert and William are the only British father and son both to have been awarded the DCM, although an instance of a Canadian father and son, Henry and Charles Bryce, achieving this is known.
