= Eirik Winter =

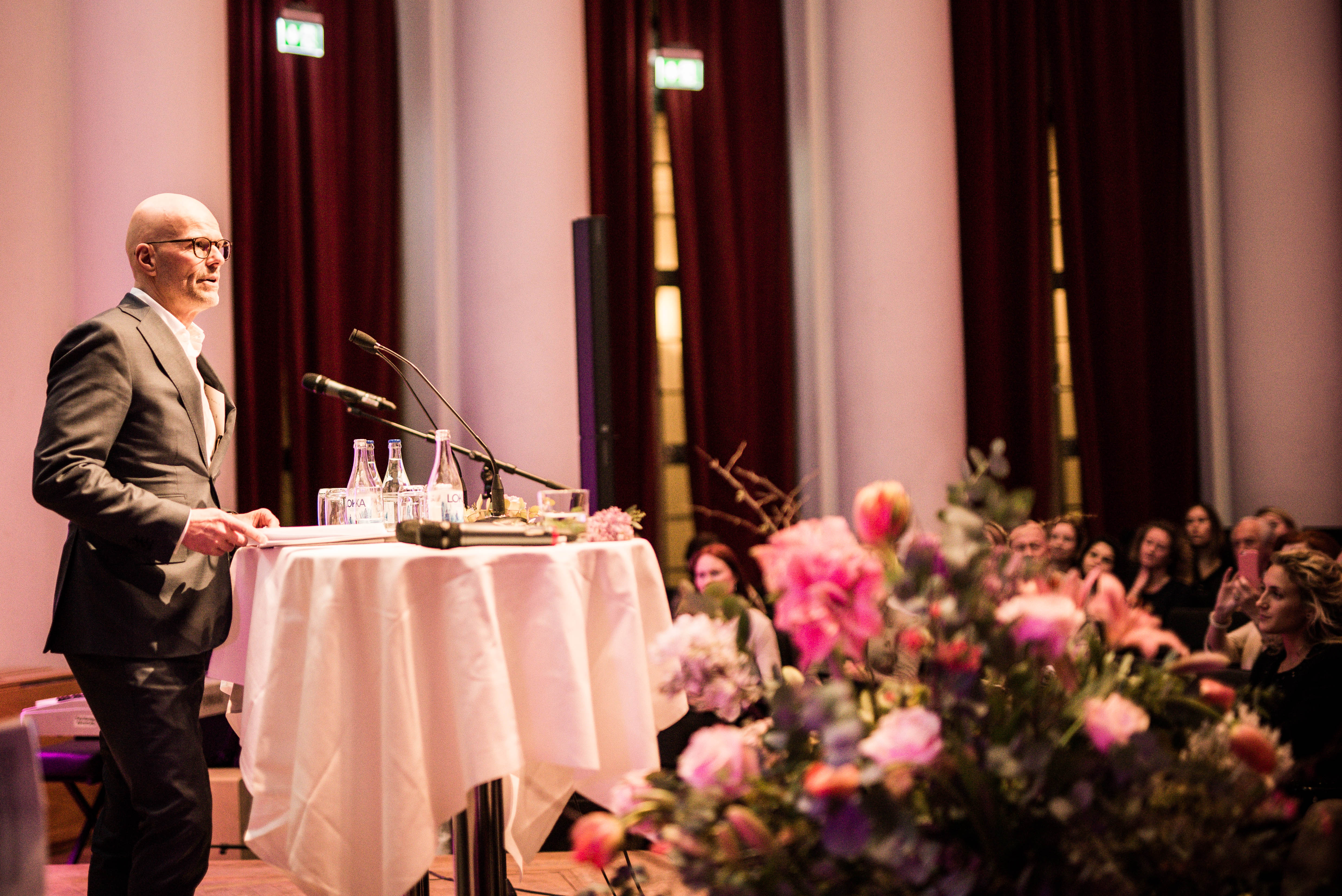
Eirik Winter at the `Female Economist of the Year´ ceremony

Eirik Winter is an international banker of Swedish-Finnish origin.

Winter studied at Uppsala University in Sweden and Stanford University in the U.S. In 1990 he moved to London with JPMorgan Chase. He joined Salomon Brothers in 1996, which merged with Citi in 2000. Having spent over twenty years in London, he has held several senior positions within Global Capital Markets and was previously Citi's Head of Capital Markets for Europe, Middle East, Africa.

According to Euromoney (GlobalCapital), Winter is "one of the European Bond markets most popular and respected figures" and elected by the same publication as one of the "Top 100 most Influential people in Capital markets".

Winter re-located to the Nordic region in 2012, where he became Chairman, Managing Director and Head of Investment Banking at Citi. During his time at Citi, Citi's Nordic operations won several awards, such as M&A House of the Year by Mergermarket and several investment banking awards from Euromoney.

In addition, Eirik Winter was engaged as a business sponsor for Citi Women Nordic Network and mentor for Stockholm School of Economics scholarship Female Economist of the Year, as well as Citi Foundation's program with Junior Achievement and Youth Business International.

Winter is also a board member of several organisations such as The Swedish-American Chamber of Commerce in New York, Foreign Bankers´ Association and The Swedish Bankers Association.

Winter joined BNP Paribas in 2018 as CEO for BNP Paribas Group Nordic Region and Head of CIB Nordics. He is a member of the Global Banking EMEA Board and the EMEA Management Team.

Eirik Winter, a keen promoter of the Nordic region, has written several widely published debate articles about an unified Nordic region - "United States of North"

He is an officer in the Army reserve forces, keen cyclist, skier, ice skater and sailor.
