= Edward Winter =

Edward Winter may refer to:

- Edward Winter (actor) (1937–2001), American actor
- Edward Winter (chess historian) (born 1955), English journalist, historian and author about the game of chess
- Edward Winter (cricketer) (1773–1830), English cricketer
- Edward Winter (English administrator) (1622–1686), English administrator employed by the East India Company
- Edward Winter (tennis) (born 2004), Australian tennis player
- H. Edward Winter (1908–1976), American enamelist
- Edward Henry Winter (1879–1941), American politician and newspaper publisher from Missouri

== See also ==
- Ed Wynter (1904–1974), rugby league footballer
