= Michael Winter =

Michael Winter may refer to:

- Michael Winter (professor) (born 1955), director of the Centre for Rural Policy Research at the University of Exeter
- Michael Winter (sport shooter) (born 1976), German Olympic sport shooter
- Michael Winter (writer) (born 1965), Canadian writer
- Mike Winter (soccer) (born 1952), Austrian-American soccer goalkeeper
- Mike Winter (equestrian) (born 1974), Canadian equestrian

== See also ==
- Michael Winters (disambiguation)
