= Ralph Winter =

Ralph Winter may refer to:

- Ralph Winter (producer) (born 1952), American movie producer
- Ralph D. Winter (1924–2009), American missionary leader
- Ralph K. Winter Jr. (1935–2020), American judge

== See also ==
- Ralph E. Winters (1909–2004), Canadian film editor
