= Solomon Winter =

Hungarian philanthropist

Solomon Winter, Hungarian philanthropist; born in the county of Zips, Hungary, in 1778; died at Hunsdorf, in the same county, February 24, 1859, after laboring for sixty years for the advancement of the Jewish race in his locality. The erection of the synagogue in Hunsdorf about 1820, and the construction of the school in 1840, were due to him; and he was a representative of the collective communities of the county in the Budapest congress of Jewish notables.
