= Stefan Winter (ski mountaineer) =

German ski mountaineer

Personal information
- Born: 16 March 1968 (age 58)

Sport
- Sport: Skiing
Medal record
Representing Germany

Stefan Winter (born 16 March 1968) is a German ski mountaineer, former coach of the German ski mountaineering team, and alpine sports author.

Winter is teacher of sports and German and a DAV mountain guide. He took part in several ski mountaineering tours in his teens and competed in ski mountaineering events, amongst others in the 2001 Trofeo Mezzalama race, in the 2005 Pierra Menta race together with Günther Maier, in the Trophee du Muveran and others. At the DAV he was head of the school sports climbing section of the "mountain climbing, training and security" department as well as leader of the DAV youth course program, a mountain climbing training institution for children and teens. In 2002 he became coordinator of ski mountaineering at the DAV under Dr. Wolfgang Wabel, head of the "sports climbing—ski mountaineering—competitive mountain climbing" department. In this position, he led the establishment of the national ski mountaineering team. He was also member of the DAV federal instruction team of mountain climbing as well as member of the special DAV federal instruction team of sports climbing. Furthermore, he was voluntary speaker of school sports and general sports climbing of the DAV Oberland section and was responsible for the sportive workflow organization at the 2005 World Climbing Championship in Munich. At the moment he is responsible for popular mountain sports, sports development and security research at the DAV, and is technical adviser of Salewa. He lives in Munich. In his coach position he was followed by Hermann Kofler.
