= Ludwig Georg Winter =

German politician

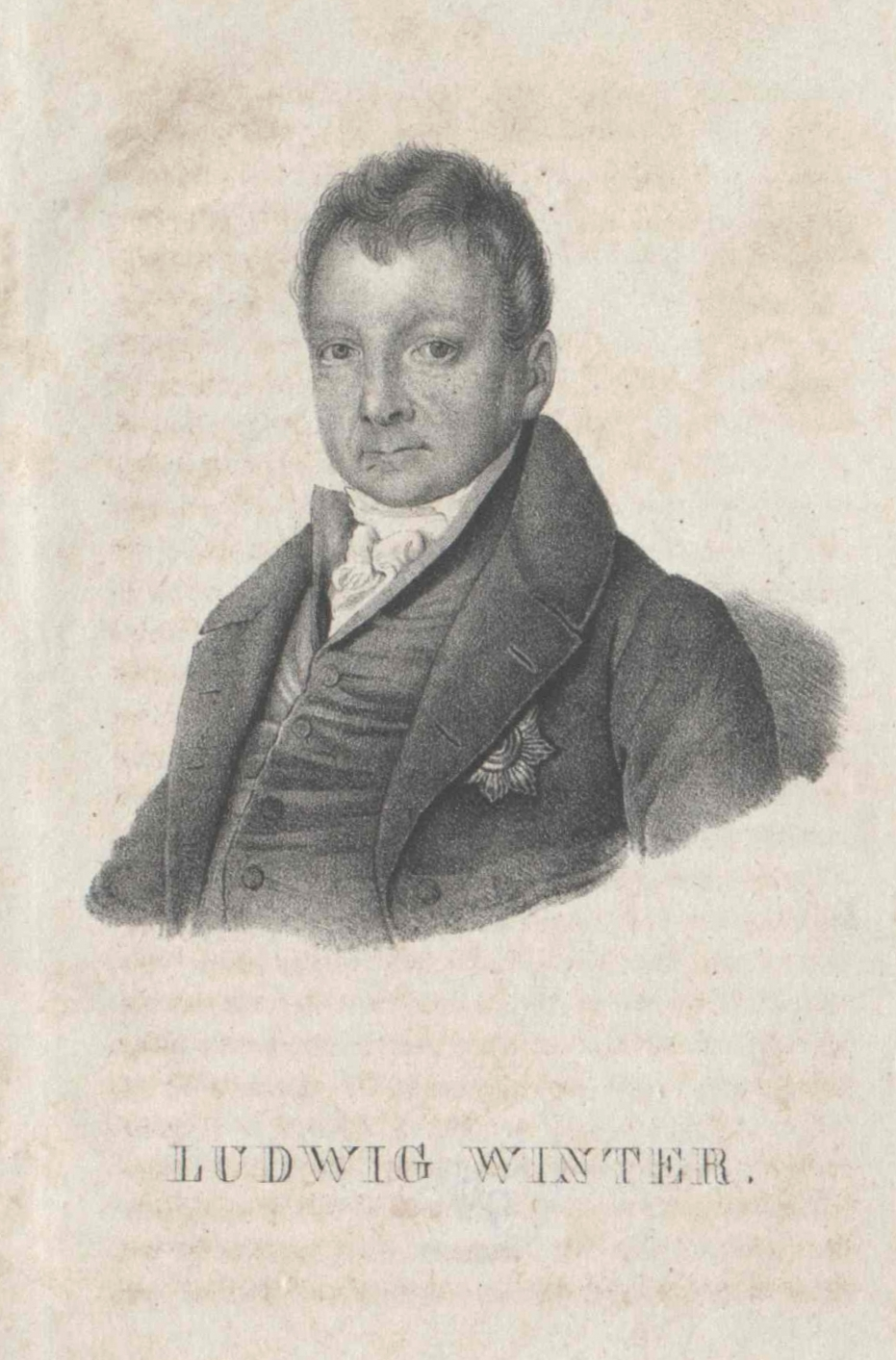
Ludwig Winter

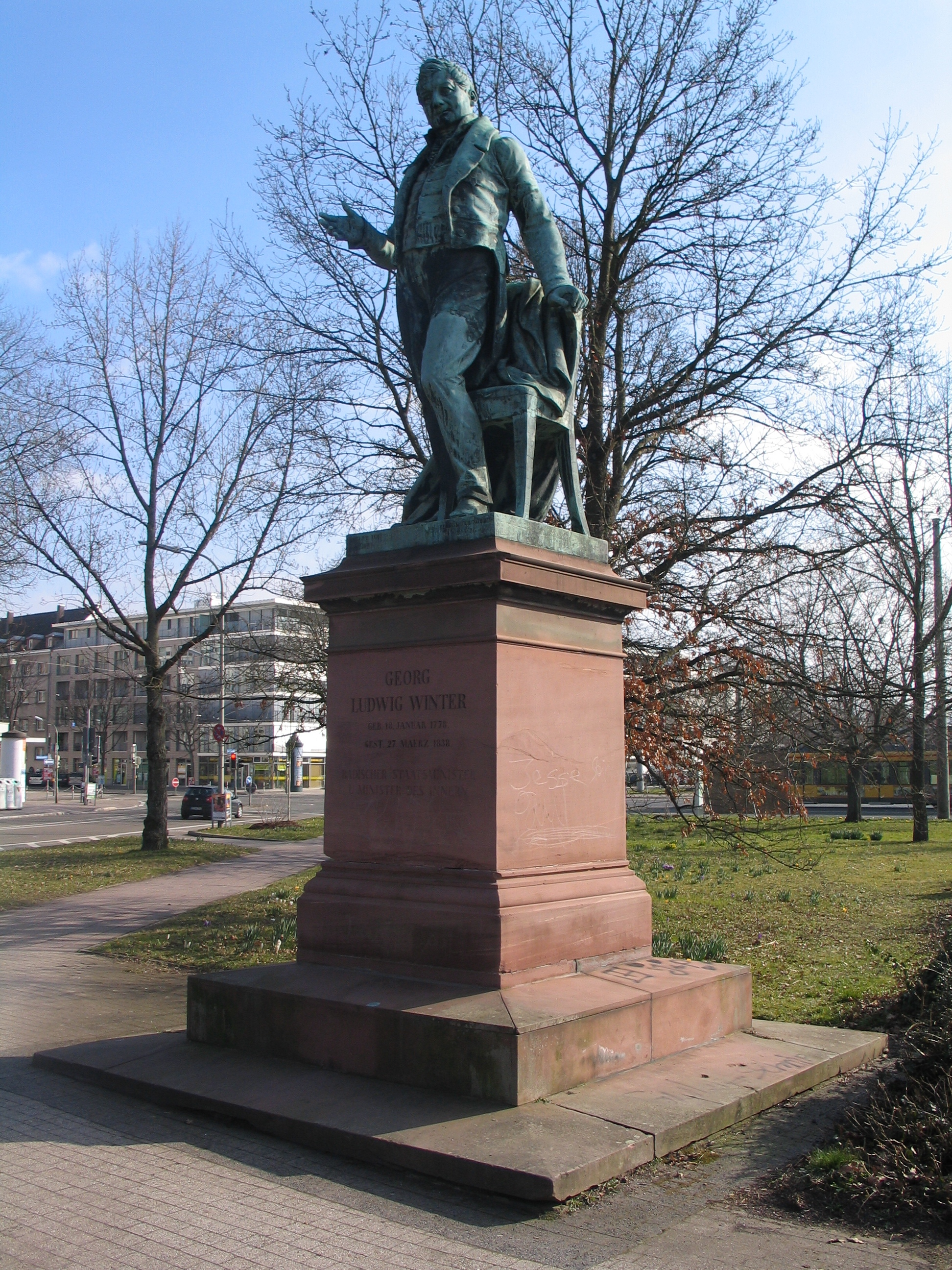
Statue in Karlsruhe

Ludwig Georg Winter (born 18 January 1778 in Elzach-Prechtal, died 27 March 1838 in Karlsruhe) was a politician from Baden.

== Biography ==
In 1815 Winter joined the Baden Ministry of the Interior as Ministerialrat. In 1830 he became Minister of the Interior of the Grand Duchy, and from 1833 to 1838 he headed the affairs of state in Baden as Minister of State.

He was a prominent figure during the early liberal economic and political reforms in Baden. He campaigned for the correction of the Rhine, the expansion of the Mannheim harbor and the road network, and the construction of the railway network.

In 1830, Ludwig Georg Winter was awarded the Grand Cross of the Zähringer Lion Order. Winter died of a stroke on March 27, 1838.
