= Amelia (given name) =

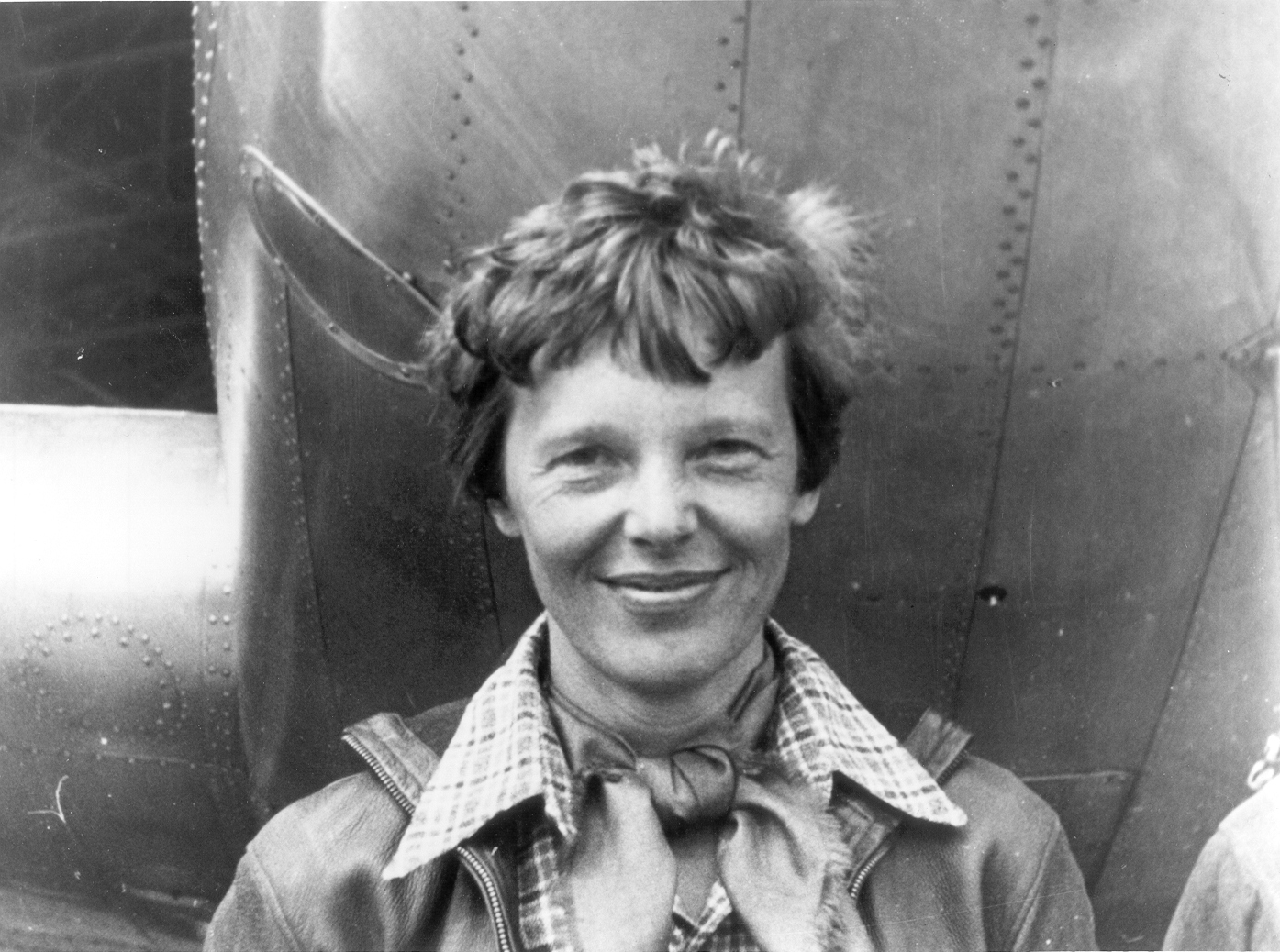
- Amelia Earhart, legendary American aviator
- Pronunciation: /əˈmiːliə/ ə-MEE-lee-ə
- Gender: Female
- Language: English, German, Latin

Origin
- Meaning: German word amal meaning work and Latin aemulus, meaning rival

Other names
- Nicknames: Amy, Melly, Lili , Malia, Mila, Mel, Lia, Mia, Millie, Mimi, Emma, Minnie, Ellie
- See also: Amalia, Amelie, Amélie, Amy, Lia, Emma

Amelia is a feminine given name. Its English form was likely influenced by the names Amalia, derived from the Germanic root amal, with meanings "vigorous, active, work", and Emilia, derived from the name of the Roman Aemilia gens. The name of the gens is likely derived from the Latin word aemulus, meaning rival. The name Amelia has been associated with both names.

== Popularity ==
The name has been popular in the Anglosphere and throughout Europe in the 21st century, as well as in other countries. Its increase in popularity has been attributed to an elegant image and associations with American aviator Amelia Earhart, as well as a similarity in sound to previously popular names such as Amanda, Amy, and Emily, and to having the fashionable ia ending of other popular names Sophia and Olivia. All make the name seem "different but not too different." The name also gained popularity thanks to the French film Amélie, which became especially popular across Europe.

In 2022, in the United States, the name Amelia was given to 12,333 girls, making it the fourth most popular name. It was also the fourth most popular name given to girls in Canada that year.

== Notable people ==
- Amalberga of Maubeuge (died 690), Saint Amelia, early medieval saint
- Princess Amelia of Great Britain (1711–1786)
- Princess Amelia of the United Kingdom (1783–1810)
- Amelia Adamo (born 1947), Swedish magazine founder and editor
- Amelia Adams, Australian journalist, news presenter, producer and reporter
- Amelia Andersdotter (born 1987), Swedish politician
- Amelia Barbieri (1918–2016), Italian nurse, midwife, and lay missionary
- Amelia Edith Huddleston Barr (1831–1911), English novelist
- Amelia Bauerle (1873–1916), British painter, illustrator, and etcher
- Amelia Beauclerc (1790–1820), British Gothic novelist
- Amelia Bloomer (1818–1894), American feminist, started the newspaper The Lily, popularized bloomers
- Amelia Bullmore (born 1964), English actress
- Amelia Cass (born 1999), British para-cyclist
- Amelia R. Coats (1877–1967), American printmaker
- Amelia Crowley (fl. 1995-), Irish actress
- Amelia Dimoldenberg (born 1994), English journalist and comedian
- Minnie Driver (born Amelia Fiona J. Driver, 1970), English actress
- Amelia Dyer (1837–1896), English serial killer
- Amelia Earhart (1897–1937), American aviator and feminist
- Amelia Robles Ávila, known as Amelio Robles Ávila (1889–1984), colonel during the Mexican Revolution
- Amelia Rose Earhart (born 1983), American pilot and news anchor
- Amelia Edwards (1831–1892), English novelist, journalist, traveler and Egyptologist
- Amelia Gentleman (born 1972), British journalist
- Amelia Gething (born 1999), English actress and writer
- Amelia S. Givin (1845–1915), American businesswoman, philanthropist
- Amelia Elizabeth Roe Gordon (1852–1932), British-born Canadian social reformer
- Amelia Gray Hamlin (born 2001), American actress, daughter of Lisa Rinna and Harry Hamlin
- Amelia Henderson (born 1995), Malaysian-British actress, presenter, YouTuber and model
- Amelia Hertzówna (1879–1942), Polish writer and cultural historian
- Amelia Horne (1839–1921), British memoir writer
- Amelia Mary Irvine (1866–1950), Irish author who wrote as A. M. Irvine
- Amelia Meath (born 1988), American musician, songwriter, producer, and dancer
- Amelia Keane, American politician
- Amelia Kemp, English footballer
- Amelia Kyambadde (born 1955), Ugandan politician, philanthropist and Women's activist
- Amelia Lambrick (1864–1956), Australian public servant
- Amelia Lewsham (c. 1748 – after 1797), Jamaican woman with albinism, enslaved and exhibited as the "White Negress" in London, subjected to examination
- Amelia Lily (born 1994), English singer
- Amelia Heinle Luckinbill (born 1973), American actress
- Amelia Okoli (1941–2017), Nigerian high jumper
- Amelia Opie (1769–1853), English author and abolitionist
- Amelia Peláez (1897–1968), Cuban painter
- Amelia Perrier (1841–1875), Irish novelist and travel writer
- Amelia Piper (1796–1856), American former slave and abolitionist
- Amelia Rajecki (born 2002), British tennis player
- Amelia Atwater-Rhodes (born 1984), American author
- Amelia Boynton Robinson (1911–2015), American activist and civil rights leader
- Amelia Solar de Claro (1836–1915), Chilean poet, playwright and essayist
- Amelia M. Starkweather (1840–1926), American educator and author
- Amelia Peabody Tileston (1872–1920), American Red Cross worker
- Amelia Warren Tyagi (born 1971), American businesswoman, management consultant, and author
- Amelia Walsh (born 1992), Canadian cyclist
- Amelia Vega (born 1984), Miss Universe 2003, from the Dominican Republic
- Amelia Warner (born 1982), English actress
- Amelia Watson (1856–1934), American watercolorist
- Amelia Watson (streamer), Virtual YouTuber
- Amelia B. Coppuck Welby (1819–1852), American poet
- Lady Amelia Windsor (born 1995), English model
- Amelia Kempshall Wing (1837–1927), American author and philanthropist
- Amelia Frank (1906–1937), American physicist

== Fictional characters ==
- Title character in Henry Fielding's novel Amelia (novel)
- Amelia Jones, one of the main characters in Power Rangers Dino Fury and Power Rangers Cosmic Fury
- Title character in Amelia's Notebooks, a series of books by Marissa Moss
- Amelia Jane, doll antiheroine of a children's book series by Enid Blyton
- Amelia (Underworld), the only female Vampire Elder in the Underworld film series
- Amelia Bedelia, title character in books by Peggy Parish
- Amelia Bones, in the Harry Potter series
- Amelia Bonetti, character portrayed by Giulietta Masina in the 1986 film Ginger and Fred by Federico Fellini
- Amelia Brand, in the 2014 film Interstellar, played by Anne Hathaway
- Amelia Gabble, an English goose in the 1970 animated film The Aristocats
- Amelia Louise McBride, title character in the graphic novel series Amelia Rules! by Jimmy Gownley
- Amelia "Milly" Michaelson, a character in 1986 American fantasy drama film The Boy Who Could Fly
- Amelia Murgatroyd (nicknamed Amy), minor character in the 1950 novel A Murder Is Announced by Agatha Christie
- Amelia Peabody, the main character in a series of mystery novels by Elizabeth Peters
- Amelia "Amy" Pond, companion of the Eleventh Doctor in the television series Doctor Who
- Amélie Poulain from Jean-Pierre Jeunet's French comedy film Amélie
- Amelia Sachs in the Lincoln Rhyme Series, written by Jeffrey Deaver, played by Angelina Jolie in the movie version of The Bone Collector
- Amelia Sedley, in the novel Vanity Fair by William Thackeray
- Amelia Wil Tesla Seyruun, in the anime Slayers
- Amelia Shepherd, a neurosurgeon in the TV medical dramas Grey's Anatomy and Private Practice
- Princess Amelia Thermopolis, commonly called "Mia", main character in The Princess Diaries book series by Meg Cabot
- Amelia Voght, a Marvel Comics character in the X-Men franchise
- Amelia Von Butch, a treasure hunter and main antagonist in the 2005 animated film Scooby-Doo! in Where's My Mummy?
- Amelia, in the TV series Rubbadubbers
- Amelia Hughes, the first season antagonist of the 2019 animated series Infinity Train
- Captain Amelia, in the 2002 film Treasure Planet
- Amelia Collier, a character in the video game The Outlast Trials
- Amelia (Pathways), in the game Pathways
- Amelia Evans in the Manga And Anime Freezing

== See also ==
- Amelia (disambiguation)
- Amélie (given name)
- Amalie (given name)
- Emelia (given name)
