= Ameglio =

Ameglio is a surname. Notable people with the surname include:

- Carlos Ameglio (born 1965), Uruguayan film director
- Giovanni Ameglio (1854–1921), Italian general
- Marco Ameglio (born 1961), Panamanian businessman
- Pietro Ameglio (born 1957), Uruguayan-born Mexican activist

== See also ==
- Amelio
