= Amelio =

Amelio is both a surname and a given name. This name derives from the Germanic-Gothic name “*amal / ama-l”, meaning “work, vigor, courage, brave, bold, diligent. Notable people with the name include:

== Surname ==
- Austin Amelio, American actor best known for his roles on The Walking Dead and Everybody Wants Some
- Gianni Amelio (born 1945), Italian film director
- Gil Amelio (born 1943), American technology executive
- Lucio Amelio (1931–1994), Italian art dealer, curator, and actor
- Philip Amelio (1977–2005), American actor and teacher
- Sonia Amelio (born 1941), Mexican dancer, musician, choreographer, and actress
- William Amelio, American business executive who held the position of CEO of Lenovo

== Given name ==
- Amelio Robles Ávila, colonel during the Mexican Revolution
- Amelio Della Chiesa, American politician and mayor of Quincy, Massachusetts

== See also ==
- Ameli (disambiguation)
- D'Amelio (disambiguation)
- Amelia (disambiguation)
