= D'Amelio =

D'Amelio is an Italian surname, and may refer to:

- Via D'Amelio bombing, a 1992 bombing in Sicily

== People with the surname ==
- Anthony D'Amelio (born 1964), American politician
- Charli D'Amelio (born 2004), American social media personality
- Dixie D'Amelio (born 2001), American singer and social media personality
- Frank D'Amelio (born 1957), American soccer player

== See also ==
- Amelio, a given name and surname
- D'Alelio, a surname
