= Ameli =

Ameli may refer to:

- Ameli, Eritrea, a town
- Ameli, Duchess of Oldenburg (1923–2016)
- Ameli Koloska (born 1944), West German retired javelin thrower
- CETME Ameli, a Spanish light machine gun

== See also ==
- Amalie (disambiguation)
- Amelia (disambiguation)
- Amelie (disambiguation)
