= Uruguayans in Mexico =

Dynonym

Uruguayan Mexicans uruguayo-mexicanos
Total population
- 3,023 Uruguay-born residents (2017) Unknown number of Mexicans of Uruguayan descent

Regions with significant populations
- Mexico City, Guadalajara, León, Toluca, Valle de Bravo, Querétaro, Puebla, Monterrey, and regions of Quintana Roo, Yucatan

Languages
- Uruguayan Spanish

Religion
- Roman Catholicism, minority of Protestantism Judaism and Irreligion

Related ethnic groups
- Uruguayan diaspora, Argentine Mexican

Uruguayan Mexicans are people born in Uruguay who live in Mexico, or Mexico-born people of Uruguayan descent.

== Overview ==
There are many Uruguay-born persons living in Mexico for a number of reasons. Both countries share the Spanish language, the historical origins of both nations is common (part of the Spanish Empire until the early 19th century), Mexico has a much bigger economy which attracted Uruguayans in search of opportunities, and, from the political point of view, during the civic-military dictatorship of Uruguay (1973-1985) ideological affinity made Mexico attractive as an exile destination for Uruguayans.

Uruguayans living in Mexico have their own institutions such as the Consultative Councils in Mexico City, Cancun, Puebla, and Toluca.

== Notable people ==
Past

- Carlos Miloc (1932-2017), football coach
- Alejandro Zaffaroni (1923-2014), serial entrepreneur in the biotechnological field
- Alfredo Zitarrosa (1936-1989), singer-songwriter

Present

- Pietro Ameglio (born 1958 in Uruguay), civil rights and peace activist
- Marcelo Buquet (born 1963 in Montevideo), actor and model
- Nery Castillo (born 1984 in San Luis Potosí), footballer who started his career in Uruguay
- Edgardo Codesal (born 1951 in Montevideo), football referee
- Eduardo Milán (born 1952 in Rivera), poet and critic
- Bárbara Mori (born 1978 in Montevideo), actress
- Kenya Mori (born 1976 in Mexico City), actress
- Xavier Biscayzacú Vázquez (born 2005 in Veracruz)
- Carlos Pereda (born 1944 in Florida), philosopher
- Rodrigo Plá (born 1968 in Montevideo), screenwriter and film director

== See also ==
- Mexico–Uruguay relations
- Immigration to Mexico
