= Amelia =

Amelia may refer to:

== Arts, entertainment, and media ==
=== Films ===
- Amélia (film), a 2000 Brazilian film directed by Ana Carolina
- Amelia (film), 2009, based on the life of Amelia Earhart

=== Literature ===
- Amelia (magazine), a Swedish women's magazine
- Amelia (novel), a 1751 sentimental novel by Henry Fielding
- Amelia Bedelia, a series of US children's books
- Amelia Jane, a series of books by Enid Blyton
- Amelia Rules!, a series of American children's graphic novels

=== Music ===
- Amelia (Mimi Webb album), a 2023 album
- Amelia (Laurie Anderson album), a 2024 album
- Amelia (opera), music by Daron Hagen; libretto by Gardner McFall; story by Stephen Wadsworth
- "Amelia" (song), by Joni Mitchell on her 1976 album Hejira
- "Amelia", a song by The Mission, from the album Carved in Sand
- "Amelia", a song by the Cocteau Twins on their 1984 album Treasure
- "Amelia", a song by Prism on their 1977 album Prism
- "Amelia", a 1972 song by Wayne Cochran and The C.C. Riders

== People ==
- Amelia (given name), including people so named
- Marco Amelia (born 1982), Italian football goalkeeper
- Princess Amelia (disambiguation)

== Places ==
=== United States ===
- Amelia, Louisiana, a census-designated place in St. Mary Parish, Louisiana
- Amelia, Nebraska, an unincorporated community in Holt County, Nebraska
- Amelia, Ohio, a village in Clermont County, Ohio
- Amelia, West Virginia
- Amelia City, Florida, a town in Nassau County, Florida
- Amelia County, Virginia
- Amelia Courthouse, Virginia, a village in Amelia County near Richmond
- Amelia Island, the southernmost of the Sea Islands, near Florida

=== Elsewhere ===
- Amelia, Umbria, a town in Italy
- Amelia Cove, a former settlement in Newfoundland and Labrador, Canada

== Ships ==
- Amelia (ship)
- HMS Amelia, ships of the Royal Navy

== Other uses ==
- Amelia (birth defect)
- Amelia (typeface)
- Tropical Storm Amelia (disambiguation)
- Amelia (company), an internet technology company
- Amelia (airline), a French airline
- Amelia, a character in the Pathways video game, now also a meme

== See also ==
- Aemilia (disambiguation)
- Amélie (disambiguation)
