= Poverty in Mexico =

Poverty in Mexico refers to its incidence and measurement. It is measured based on the country's social development laws and under parameters such as nutrition, clean water, housing, education, health care, social security, quality and availability of basic services in households, income and social cohesion. It is divided into two categories: moderate poverty and extreme poverty.

Poverty headcount ratio (2024)
Poverty trend	World Bank
Live with less than $1.00 a day	0.1% (0.13 million)
Live with less than $2.00 a day	0.55% (0.72 million)
Live with less than $2.50 a day	1.01% (1.32 million)
Live with less than $4.00 a day	3.6% (4.71 million)
Live with less than $5.00 a day	6.5% (8.51 million)

While 1.65% of Mexico's population lives below the international poverty line of $3.00 a day set by the World Bank, as of 2024, Mexico's government estimates that 24.2% of the population lives in moderate poverty and 5.3% lives in extreme poverty, resulting in 29.6% of Mexico's total population living below the national poverty line. According to CONEVAL, the institution designated to measure poverty in Mexico, poverty analysis should not only consider monetary income but also social factors. Six different deprivations serve as indicators in terms of poverty measurement: educational backwardness, access to health services, access to social security, access to (decent) food, quality of living spaces, and finally, access to basic services in housing (having a roof over one's head and access to certain goods and services).

Woman in Guanajuato, Mexico

To be considered poor, it is enough to have an income below the welfare line (income that is less than the basic food and non-food basket), regardless of the number of social deprivations a person has, if any. On the other hand, there is extreme poverty, the most precarious situation a person can find themselves in. This occurs when a person's income is less than the food basket, and they also experience three or more of the aforementioned deficiencies. The extreme gap is explained by the government's adoption of the multidimensional poverty method as a way to measure poverty. This method defines a person with income above the "international poverty line" or "welfare line", set by the Mexican government, as "moderately poor" if they have one or more deficiencies related to social rights, such as education (they did not complete their studies), nutrition (malnutrition or obesity), or living standards (access to basic services such as water or electricity, and secondary household goods, such as refrigerators). The Mexican government defines extreme poverty as deficiencies in both social rights and income below the "welfare line". Additional figures from SEDESOL (Mexico's social development agency) estimate that 6% of the population (7.4 million people) lives in extreme poverty and suffers from food insecurity.

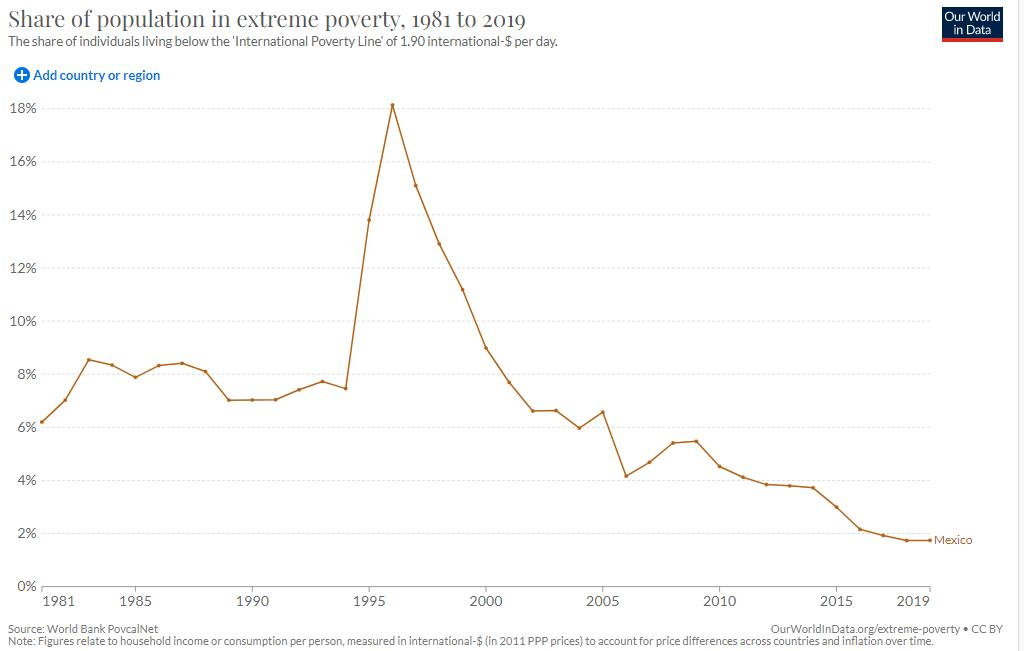
Share of population in extreme poverty over time

The county's high poverty rates, despite Mexico's positive potential, are a recurring topic of discussion among professionals. Some economists have speculated that, in four more decades of continued economic growth, even with emigration and violence, Mexico will rank among the world's five largest economies, along with China, the United States, Japan, and India.

Recently, significant changes in government economic policy and attempts at reducing government intervention through privatization of various sectors allowed Mexico to remain Latin America's largest economy up until 2005, when it became the second largest. Despite these changes, Mexico continues to suffer from significant social inequality and a lack of opportunities. The Enrique Peña Nieto administration attempted to reduce poverty in the country by providing more professional and educational opportunities for its citizens, as well as establishing a universal healthcare system.

== Background ==
Mexico's unequal development between the richer urban zones and the considerably poorer rural zones has been attributed to the fast economic growth that took place during the so-called Mexican miracle, the period in which the Mexican economy transitioned from an agricultural economy to an industrial one. This led many people to relocate to the cities. Even though investments were pouring into urban infrastructure, the government couldn't accommodate the rapid influx of people, which led to the development of slums on the outskirts of many Mexican cities. The constant government corruption is another factor to which poverty is frequently attributed. Only in recent years, after various economic setbacks, Mexico has recovered to a level where the middle class, once virtually nonexistent, is beginning to flourish.

Social stratification, still greatly present in Mexico, can be traced back to the country's origin. In the Colonial Period, before its independence, the upper class was composed of those who owned the land, and the lower class was made up of those who worked the land. After the Mexican Revolution, the government ceded an estimated 50 percent of the land to the general population, covering a small portion of the gap between the wealthy and the poor. Land ownership continued to be the main source of wealth for Mexicans and has dictated the hierarchy of wealth distribution amongst the population. After the country entered its economic industrial transformation, industrialists, businessmen, and politicians have controlled the direction of wealth in Mexico and have remained among the wealthy.

The average individual gross annual income in Mexico in 2002 was US$6,879.37 (2010 dollars). 12.3 percent of the Mexican labor force earns the daily minimum wage or MX$1,343.28 per month (approx. US$111.94 November 2010 exchange rates). 20.5 of the labor force earns twice the minimum wage and 21.4 percent earns up to three times the daily minimum wage while 18.6 earn no more than five daily minimum wages. Only 11.8 percent of the working population earn wages equal or above MX$6,716.40 (US$559.70) per month. According to Jaime Saavedra, World Bank Poverty Manager for Latin America, Mexico has made considerable strides in poverty reduction since the late 1990s, with performance above the Latin American average. Saavedra explained that: "Between 2000 and 2004, extreme poverty fell almost seven percentage points, which can be explained by development in rural areas, where extreme poverty fell from 42.4 per cent to 27.9 per cent. The urban poverty rate, however, got stuck at 11.3 per cent."

=== Government involvements ===
Social development began to take place in the form of written policy in the early 1900s. The Mexican Constitution, approved in 1917, outlined the basic social protections citizens are entitled to, including the right to property, education, health care, and employment; and it establishes the federal government responsible for the execution and enforcement of these protections.

Map of Mexican states indicating Human Development Index (2004) 0.80 and higher 0.750–0.799 0.70–0.749

The global economic crisis of the late 1920s and forward slowed down any possibility of social development in the country. Between the 1920s and the 1940s, illiteracy rates ranged from 61.5 to 58 percent, prompting the government to focus on establishing social protection institutions. By the late 1950s, 59 percent of the population knew how to read and write. In the 2000s, only 9.5 percent of the population older than 15 years was illiterate. By the 1960s, individual involvement of some states to increase social development, along with the country's economic growth, as well as employment opportunities and greater income, and the migration of people from rural states to urban areas, helped reduce poverty nationwide. The 1970s and 1980s saw the transformation of government and economic policies. The government gave way to flexible foreign trade, deregulation, and privatization of several sectors. After the economic crisis of the 1990s, Mexico recovered to become an emerging economic power; however, the number of poor nationwide has remained constant even with the country's overall growth.

=== Regional variation ===
Historically, southern states like Chiapas, Oaxaca, and Guerrero have remained segregated from the rest of the country. Their implementation of infrastructure, social development, education, and economic growth has been poorly accounted for. These states hold the highest levels of illiteracy, unemployment, lack of basic services such as running water and sanitation, overall urban infrastructure, and government establishment. As citizens of the least fortunate states have noticed growth and improvements in other states, many have simply left seeking better opportunities.

== Causes of poverty ==
The reasons for poverty in Mexico are complex and widely extensive. There is an agreement that a combination of uneven distribution of wealth and resources sponsored by economic and political agendas to favor the rich and powerful is a major contributor to the millions left behind.

=== Individual condition ===
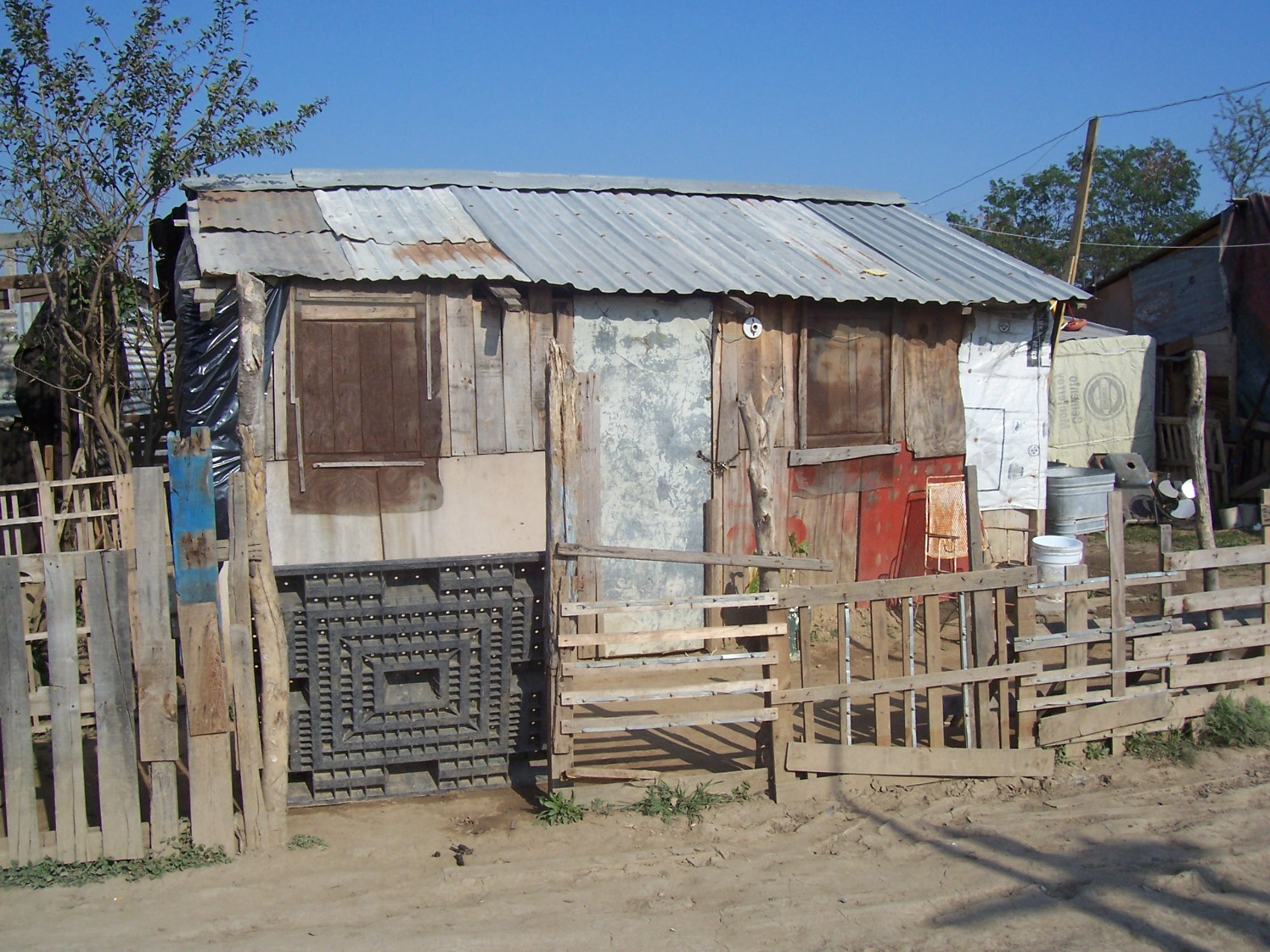
Marginalized settlement "Colinas del Río", in the municipality Benito Juárez, Nuevo León, 2005.

In the economic sense, access to insufficient monetary means to afford goods and services becomes the immediate reason to be poor. Because a person's personal income dictates what he or she can afford and what he or she will remain deprived of, the first common cause of poverty is the individual condition. This means, a person's individual circumstances and possibilities create their opportunity for access to goods and services. This condition is triggered by a person's income, education, training or work experience, social network, age, health, and other socio-economic factors:

==== Lack of and unavailability of education ====
As the population has grown, the number of students enrolled in schools throughout the country has grown tremendously since the 1950s. At the same time, government efforts to accommodate the growing student population, improving the quality of instruction and promoting prevalent school attendance has not been enough and therefore education has not remained among priorities for families who must struggle with poverty. 700,000 students from grades 1-9 dropped out of school in 2009 across Mexico. 7.9 percent (almost 9 million) of the population is illiterate. 73% of Mexican households have at least one member without education or education below the 7th grade. 40 percent of people in the states of Chiapas, Veracruz, Hidalgo, Oaxaca and Guerrero have education below the 7th grade.

==== Low quality public education ====
The state of public education in Mexico has been a topic of concern due to challenges in achieving educational progress. Efforts to address these challenges have faced obstacles, particularly in relation to teacher unions that have been criticized for demanding significant concessions while delivering limited results. This situation has led to concerns about the overall quality and efficiency of public education. Critics argue that these issues contribute to a broader problem of inadequate access to quality education, which, in turn, has implications for human development. Some argue that these challenges can lead to a lower human development index (HDI) and impact individuals' opportunities for personal and professional growth, potentially contributing to a cycle of poverty.

==== Underemployment ====
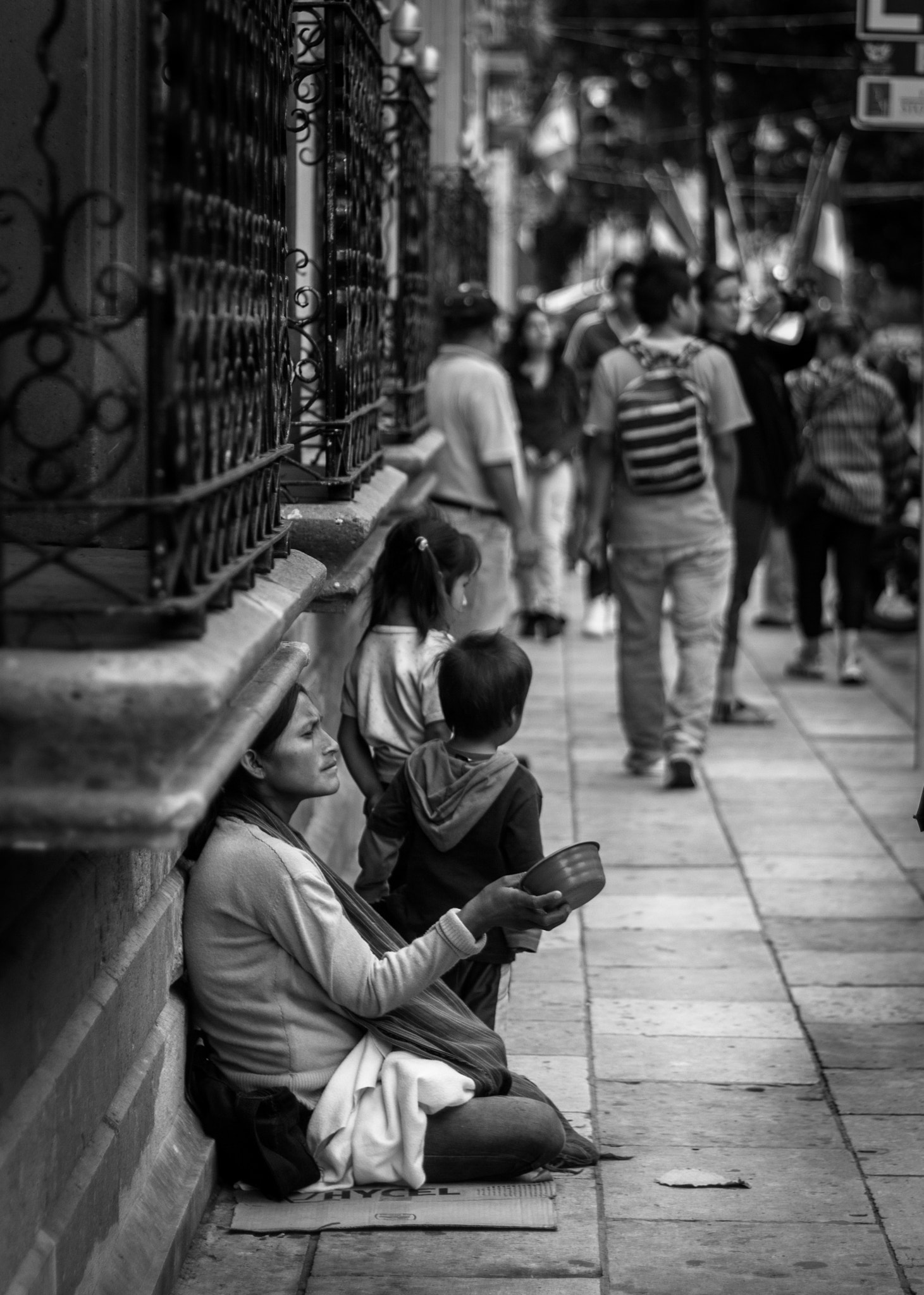
Poverty in the streets

Getting an education does not immediately translate to landing better-paying jobs or overcoming underemployment in Mexico. According to data compiled by the Civic Observatory for Education, fewer than 20% of recent graduates manage to find an appropriate position during their first round of job-hunting. Although the country has made great strides in education and professional training, the absence of a serious employment policy means that economic expansion is sacrificed so that higher prices can be avoided. That exerts a negative impact on the labor market in both the short and medium term, and on new professionals most of all. Situations like this have caused the standard of living among the urban middle class to deteriorate and as a consequence brings on emigration from this sector to other countries, mainly the United States and Canada. Mexico has an extensive infrastructure of informal economics, which further complicates the measurement of unemployment, as people involved in these jobs are not considered unemployed, while not being officially employed either (ex. housemaids, street sellers, artisans). It is estimated that 59% of the jobs in the country belong to the informal economy.

==== Birth rate, contraception, and life expectancy ====
Although Mexico's birth rate has been declining steadily since the 1970s, its population growth still exceeds its ability to pull people out of abject poverty. Contraception is widely used, despite it being a hot-button political and religious issue. Contraception is provided through a government-sponsored program called Mexfam. The average life expectancy has drastically increased from 60 years in 1968 to 77 years in 2012. Rural areas still have the highest birth rates and poverty rates in Mexico, with indigenous populations topping the list.

==== Other challenges ====
Mexico does not promote equal opportunity employment despite established laws forbidding most socially recognized forms of discrimination. The government doesn't become sufficiently involved to promote opportunities to all citizens; including reducing discrimination against middle-aged and older citizens. Over a million of the unemployed face age discrimination, and 55% of all unemployed face some form of discrimination when seeking employment. There are virtually no opportunities for individuals with special requirements, such as the disabled. As job seekers become older, it is harder for them to get employed as employers tend to seek candidates within the "younger than 35 range". Social security (IMSS) is insufficient, and there is a huge gap in proportion to the entire population (50% covered), the workforce (30% covered), and the retired (33% covered). There is no unemployment insurance in Mexico.

=== Insufficient infrastructure ===
Mexico is a country where investment on infrastructure has remained as unequally distributed as income, especially in rural areas and in the southern states. Because many people establish in rural areas, without government permission, and without paying property taxes, the government does not make significant efforts to invest in overall infrastructure of the entire country, yet it has started to do so until the 1990s. Communities often face a combination of unpaved roads, lack of electricity and potable water, improper sanitation, poorly maintained schools, vandalism and crime, and lack of social development programs. The government did not begin to focus on improving and modernizing the federal highway system up until two decades ago when it was composed of two-lane roads; often deathtraps and the scenarios of head-on collisions between truckers and families on vacation. City and state governments often face challenges providing citizens who live on informal commerce with the basic services of urbanized life. To worsen the problem the housing laws often vary greatly from one state to another, with the state of Hidalgo having no housing laws at all. Because of this, higher income communities will invest in the development of their own communities while lower income communities might be deprived of the basics such as running water and drainage in various cases.

=== Geography and poverty ===
The concentration of poverty and distribution of wealth and opportunities is clearly visible from a geographic perspective. The northern region of the country offers higher development while the southern states are the most impoverished. This is clearly the result of states equipped with better infrastructure that others. The states of Chiapas, Oaxaca, and Guerrero are among the least developed in the country. These states hold the highest numbers of indigenous population. As a result, 75 percent of the indigenous population lives on moderate poverty line and 39 percent of these under extreme poverty.

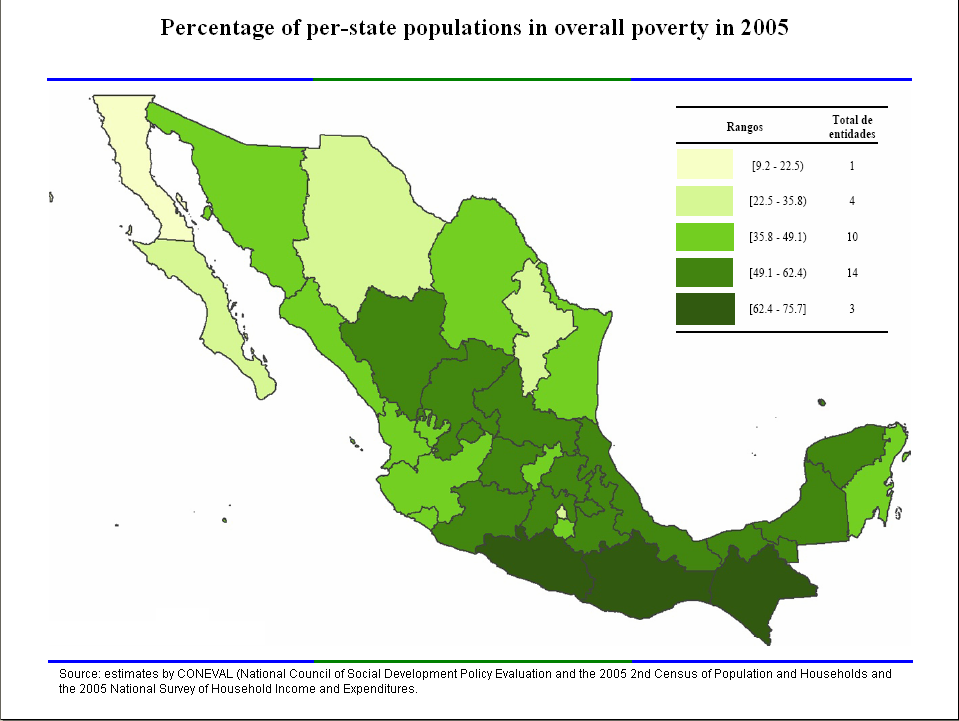
Map of Mexican states indicating levels of overall poverty (2005) 62.4-75.7 35.8-41.9 9.2-22.5

=== Unemployment ===
Unemployment in Mexico has been continuous. In 2009, the unemployment rate was estimated at 5.5 percent (over 2.5 million). Although that figure is far below the unemployment indexes in the rest of Latin America, the European Union, the United States and much of Asia, Mexico faces a serious problem generating jobs. In spite of splendid macroeconomic indicators that currently exist: continuing low levels of inflation and stability in the nation's currency exchange rate; a sufficient number of formal jobs- at least one million every year to keep up with the growing population- have not been created in over ten years. With the abundance of natural resources in the country- as well as its petroleum wealth, these benefits don't seem to reach many of the people of Mexico who lack job opportunities and the means to raise their standards of living out of poverty and marginalization.

In order to improve present day employment opportunities in Mexico, existing laws and regulations must be replaced for efficient instruments with greater legal certainty; encourage private investment; increase the collection of taxes; stimulate the productivity of businesses and the training of workers; and create more and better jobs.

=== Inequitable distribution of income ===
Differences in national income equality around the world as measured by the national Gini coefficient. A higher number means a higher income inequality

Mexico's wealth is unevenly distributed among its people where 10 percent of nation's wealthiest have 42.2 percent of all income and 10 percent of the nation's poorest have 1.3 of the remaining income. Carlos Slim, the richest man in Mexico and one of the richest in the world, has a personal fortune equal to 4 to 6 percent of the country's GDP. In spite of efforts by government officials during the past three administrations; transition to globalization, the NAFTA agreement; Mexico has been unable to create efficient public policies in order to compensate for the distortion of its market and the poor distribution of national income.

=== Obsolete regulatory framework ===
The absence of basic agreements among Mexico's main political parties for more than ten years has caused a serious backwardness in needed legislation in a number of areas. The current economic framework needs adjustment on virtually all levels including business development opportunities, fair competition, tax collection and tax law; commerce, trade and finance regulations.

=== Monopolies and duopolies ===
The Mexican economy does not support unprivileged businesses, considering its current standards regarding monopolies, both in the public and private sectors. By law, there are public monopolies: government-owned companies controlling oil and gas, electricity, water, etc. Private sector monopolies and duopolies are found in the media, television, telecommunications, and raw materials. For this reason, clear principles of competitiveness that offer incentives to private investment, both national and foreign, are needed in order for jobs to be created.

=== Government and politics ===
Mexico's rampant poverty lagged social development and general public welfare is strongly tied to its politics. Historically, the political system of Mexico has not favored the general population, mainly because it focused to become and be a single-party system of government, largely dubbed "institutionalized" where those in charge had a one-voice, unquestionable plan of action mainly focused to favor the few elite while ignoring the welfare of the rest of population. From the 1800s to the end of the 20th century, as presidential administration came and went, the forms of government has been described as authoritarian, semi-democracy, centralized government, untouchable presidencies, mass-controlling, corporatist and elite-controlled. As each administration took turn, some changes have occurred, sometimes as to contribute to the welfare of the least fortunate but, overall, the political framework behind the economic and social structure of the country continues to be the greatest contributor to inequality.

==== Foreign trade policies and foreign dependence ====
While the NAFTA agreement proved effective in increasing Mexico's economic performance, foreign trade policies have been heavily criticized by activists such as Michael Moore (in Awful Truth) as not doing enough to promote social advancement and reducing poverty. To remain competitive in the international market, Mexico has had to offer low wages to its workers while allowing high returns and generous concessions to international corporations. The words "palancas" and "favores" are part of Mexican economic culture where high-ranking policy makers and private entrepreneurs are accused of promoting their own bottom line while ignoring the necessaries of the working class.

Current recessionary trends in the United States have an even greater impact on Mexico because of the great economic dependence on the northern neighbor. After crude oil export sales, remittances sent home by Mexicans working in the United States are Mexico's second largest source of foreign income.

==== Government efforts and economic policies ====
Administration after administration, economic policies and social development programs have been targeted at decreasing poverty and increasing development in the country. Even with the best of intentions, friction between the "special interests" of decision-makers and the general public welfare, makes it difficult for clear goals in the benefit of the public to be accomplished.

Cancún is an example of how the government has failed to promote general welfare and the unequal distribution of wealth. While known for its white-sand beaches, luxurious internationally renowned hotels, and spring break destinations, Cancún displays a notable economic inequality between the tourist-oriented urban areas and its more rural surroundings, where, in several cases, the poorest neighborhoods lack one or more basic services.

==== Transparency and corruption ====
The lack of political transparency in Mexico has led to bureaucratic corruption, market inefficiencies, and income inequalities. The ability to exercise civil rights has been increasingly displaced by the control of official authorities, including access to vital information that can capture the misappropriation and mis-allocation of funds, and public participation in state and municipal-level decision-making. This opens up a channel for corruption. Evidence of this can be derived from the Corruption Perception Index 2010: Mexico received a low score of 3.1, on a scale of 0 to 10 (lower scores represent higher levels of corruption). The result is a diffusion of corruption, from the state to the municipal level, and even right down to local security.

While it can be difficult to quantify the costs of corruption with pinpoint accuracy, a report from the UN estimates that the cost is about 15 percent of Mexico's GNP, and 9 percent of its GDP. Such higher costs have adversely affected the growth of the economy, for instance deterring foreign investments due to uncertainty and risk. A study by Pricewaterhouse Coopers reveals that Mexico had lost $8.5 billion in foreign direct investments in 1999 due to corruption. Business companies admit to spend as much as 10 percent of their revenue in bureaucratic bribes. 39 percent is spent on bribing high-ranking policy makers and 61 percent on lower-ranking bureaucratic-administrative office holders. At least 30 percent of all public spending ends up in the pockets of the corrupt.

Even the domestic impact of corruption is no less severe, incurring additional expenses on firms and households. A family on average pays 109.50 pesos as bribes to authorities; households have also reported paying up to 6.9 percent of their income as bribes. In total, the cost of corruption in terms of GDP was estimated to be about $550bn in 2000.

The situation is still problematic in spite of recent initiatives by the state to become more transparent to the public. Over the years, there has been an effort by the government to reduce opacity, but even so, these initiatives often do not realize their full potential. In June 2003, under Vicente Fox's presidency, the implementation of the Federal Law of Transparency and Access to Public Government Information (IFAI) offered civic organizations and members of the public to acquire previously undisclosed information. This reform has led to the exposure of previous under-the-radar activities, such as the government's misappropriation of 200 million pesos that was intended to combat AIDS. And yet, censorship is still prevalent: in 2008, changes were proposed to increase the subjugation of IFAI's decisions to state control, so that the distribution of information would become more centralized. A number of vertical subversions were also carried out at the time, including the merging of offices that handled information requests with less important agencies. This violated the earlier progressive changes to the constitution, including Article 6, so that transparency was threatened.

Opacity is therefore an important factor in determining inequality, especially in affecting the well-being of lower-class households. When resources are misallocated and official funds pocketed by illegitimate parties, the true quality of public services such as healthcare tend to be lower than expected; similarly, the secrecy of the government's budget allocation prevents public scrutiny, so it is difficult to establish financial accountability. As well, from a broader perspective, vital infrastructure from projects, especially those aimed at facilitating social mobility, will also have to deal with the potential impediments caused by the overpricing effect and unnecessary risks of corruption, thereby reducing the accessibility of infrastructure for the poor, especially in rural areas where such infrastructure is less established than in urban areas.

=== Government and politics (social programs) ===
Mexico is a country that has significantly improved in various areas such as access to health, education, life expectancy, GDP, level of exports abroad, infrastructure, and labor productivity, among others. But it should also be noted that the distribution of income has become increasingly unequal; which is a serious problem because the misallocation and generation of resources inhibits economic competition in societies, leaving important groups of the population without the possibility of really competing in the economic sphere, which is one of the main obstacles to defeat and eradicate poverty of any kind.

The first time a social program of collective and voluntary cooperation was launched was under the leadership of Carlos Salinas de Gortari, and it was known as the National Solidarity Program (PRONASOL). Its main objective was to combat extreme poverty and meet basic needs. This program sought to foster cooperation through unpaid work.

In other words, the government provided goods and inputs to citizens, so that through their efforts and work, they would create the necessary conditions to progress and get out, with government help, from the condition of poverty. At the beginning, this program was highly questioned due to its clientelist utility. For example, there is a record that in the places where it entered with the greatest rigor and resources was in those localities in which the electoral results did not favor that president.

PRONASOL covered different axes among which were the immediate improvement in living standards, in which the government gave direct government transfers to beneficiaries; solidarity for production, in which employment opportunities and development of productive capacities and resources were offered (investing, generating and developing human capital); solidarity for regional development, where infrastructure works of regional impact were built and development programs were carried out in specific regions (generating infrastructure by regions, employing local people).

This innovative social program successfully reduced poverty rates in the country and was considered a pioneer in the field to such a degree that several Latin American countries adopted it as their primary social policy against poverty. PRONASOL was very well received by Mexican society because it allowed them to observe results and perceive an economic improvement in the very short term, since it was based on a huge amount of government direct transfers.

Also, its success was based on the improvement and development of human capital; this was evident when, for example, in rural communities the government gave away corn or different seeds so that people (laborers and farmers) could work them and obtain financial and personal benefits from them; Another example is the provision of construction material for people with limited resources, to build a decent home, or if it already exists, to improve it.

Before 2000, there wasn't an official measurement of poverty in Mexico, so it is not possible to speak of concrete figures on poverty prior to this year (all were approximations). It is known that given the distribution of money and direct government transfers to the people benefited by these programs, the situation of many improved, but we do not know for sure aggregate figures. After this year, during 2001 and 2002, SEDESOL produced the first official income-based poverty measurement.

It was not until the end of 2005 that CONEVAL was created, with the main task of measuring poverty, a mission that it carried out on a specific basis until 2009.

== Reducing poverty ==
Poverty aid organizations and social development groups have remained active in Mexico. Despite foreign and national aid programs in the country, the overall level of poverty in the country prevails.

Concerning the last two six-year terms of Mexican former presidents, it is important to highlight that the poverty figures were slowly decreasing. For example, according to CONEVAL numbers, in 2010 46.1% of the Mexican population was poor. However, in the years up to 2016, this figure dropped to 43.6%.

In addition, during that time 3 million Mexicans were removed from extreme poverty, having gone from 11.3% of Mexicans living in extreme poverty to 7%. One of the main criticisms made of the previous six-year term is that it did indeed reduce the number of people in extreme poverty, but the number of people in moderate poverty increased in a greater proportion.

A public policy to combat the lack of food was the community kitchens implemented during the administration of Enrique Peña Nieto, which succeeded in decreasing food poverty levels. The community kitchens program sought to improve the nutritional conditions of the population regarding boys and girls from 1 to 11 years of age, pregnant and lactating women, people with disabilities and adults over 65 years of age.

=== Government approach ===
- In 1997, the Mexican government launched PROGRESA (Spanish: Programa de Educación, Salud y Alimentación), an integrated approach to poverty alleviation through the development of human capital.
- In 2002, the Social Development Secretary (SEDESOL) replaced PROGRESA with Oportunidades (English: Opportunities); extending coverage to the urban poor and aiding high school students.

=== Transparency Collective ===
The Transparency Collective, or El Colectivo por la Transparencia in Spanish, is a non-governmental collective organization that advocates transparency in Mexico. It was first formed by six civil society organizations in 2002 to demand for greater transparency from state agencies, and the right to access information. Currently, it consists of eleven civil society groups with the common goal of strengthening democracy and raising accountability and the transparency of the state. The Transparency Collective offers an avenue for locals to seek help in obtaining the right to information by offering manuals and online tutorials teaching the locals how to file a request for information. It also discusses topics like human rights, the legislature and government budgets so that locals will be more informed and aware of their rights. For example, Fundar, an NGO which specializes in government budget analysis, runs workshops to educate the public on disseminating information released by government agencies.

The Transparency Collective has also been working with IFAI (Federal Institute of Access to Information). The civil society was productively engaged in the reform of the constitution. For example, CIDE, an academic focusing on public policy, worked at state level helping states comply with the reform. Fundar also focused on evaluating government responses to information requests, the appeals process and on training groups to analyze information released by the government.

Despite the organizational size of the Transparency Collective, collectivization has nonetheless been an important factor in its effectiveness. The collective call for greater transparency was one of the reasons for the comprehensive reform of Article 6 of the Mexican constitution in 2007, which heralded a new level of progression for Mexico's right-to-know movement. The reforms guaranteed the public's rights to non-confidential information at all levels of the government. State transparency laws also had to be standardized around certain basic principles within a year, and states had to implement electronic information systems.

However, in spite of this, there is still a considerable way to go to achieve full transparency. The 2008 constitutional amendments, and interference of the judiciary branch with the demanded disclosure of tax information, threatened the FOI laws that were previously established. Nevertheless, this movement has been met with fierce protests from civil society groups, and the Collective continues to appeal to the government to allow for more civil participation.

== Demographics ==
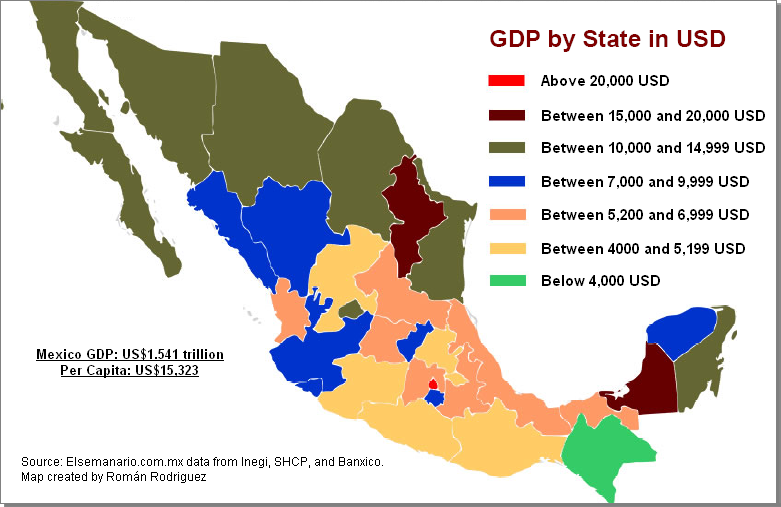
GDP by federative entity in U.S. dollars (2008)

- Mexico's wealth is unevenly distributed among its people: the richest 10 percent of the country own 42.2 percent of all income, and the poorest 10 percent own 1.3 percent of the remaining income.
- 53.4 percent of the rural population and 36.2 percent of the urban population have less than a 7th-grade education. 18.9 percent of the rural population and 8.9 percent of the urban population lack any form of formal education.
- Current figures estimate that at least 44.2 percent of the population lives in poverty. Of those, 33.7 percent live in moderate poverty, and at least 10.5 percent live in extreme poverty.
- States with highest human development: Baja California, Baja California Sur, Chihuahua, Coahuila, Colima, Federal District, Nuevo León, Quintana Roo, Sinaloa, Sonora, and Tamaulipas.
- States with lowest human development: Chiapas, Guerrero, Hidalgo, Michoacán, Oaxaca, Puebla, Tabasco, Tlaxcala, Veracruz, and Zacatecas.

=== By state ===
This list includes both moderate poverty and extreme poverty rates.

Rank	State	Poverty Rate (2012)	Poverty Rate (2010)
1	Chiapas	74.7%	78.5%
2	Guerrero	69.7%	67.6%
3	Puebla	64.5%	61.5%
4	Oaxaca	61.9%	67.0%
5	Tlaxcala	57.9%	60.3%
6	Michoacán	54.4%	54.7%
7	Zacatecas	54.2%	60.2%
8	Hidalgo	52.8%	54.7%
9	Veracruz	52.6%	57.6%
10	San Luis Potosí	50.5%	52.4%
11	Durango	50.1%	51.6%
12	Tabasco	49.7%	57.1%
13	Yucatán	48.9%	48.3%
14	Nayarit	47.6%	41.4%
-	Mexico	45.5%	46.1%
15	Morelos	45.5%	43.2%
16	México	45.3%	42.9%
17	Campeche	44.7%	50.5%
18	Guanajuato	44.5%	48.5%
19	Jalisco	39.8%	37.0%
20	Quintana Roo	38.8%	34.6%
21	Tamaulipas	38.4%	39.0%
22	Aguascalientes	37.8%	38.1%
23	Querétaro	36.9%	41.4%
24	Sinaloa	36.3%	36.7%
25	Chihuahua	35.3%	38.8%
26	Colima	34.4%	34.7%
27	Baja California Sur	31.0%	31.0%
28	Baja California	30.2%	31.5%
29	Sonora	29.1%	33.1%
30	Mexico City	28.9%	28.5%
31	Coahuila	27.9%	27.8%
32	Nuevo León	23.2%	21.0%

=== World comparison ===
The following comparisons are made between national poverty lines, meaning that each country has different criteria for setting its poverty line. For a comparison among countries under the same criteria, see international poverty line.

- Mexico is the second largest economy in Latin America, after Brazil; and the second Latin American country with most number of poor, after Brazil as well; given Mexico's population is about 80 million less than Brazil.
- Mexico has the 11th to 13th richest economy in the world and ranks 4th with most number of poor among richest economies.
- Mexico is the 10th to 13th country with the highest number of poor people in the world.
- Of the ten countries with greater population, Mexico ranks 8th as nation with most number of poor behind the People's Republic of China, India, Indonesia, Brazil, Pakistan, Nigeria, and Bangladesh.
- Of 193 United Nations members, at least 113 nations show higher levels of poverty and decreased social development, and at least 55 other nations have less poverty and higher social development.
- Mexico ranks 56th among most developed of the world's nations. It ranks 4th as most developed of Latin American countries, behind Chile.

== Poverty and indigenous communities ==
Indigenous communities suffer particularly from poverty, which marginalizes them from society. Although "local and federal governments have implemented social protection programs to alleviate poverty and interregional disparities, in general, conditions for indigenous people remain unchanged" (Gonzales cited World Bank, 2005). Various studies have shown that ethnicity is a major cause of inequality in income distribution and access to basic health services and education, which in turn explains the significant income gap between indigenous and non-indigenous people. According to the World Bank, about three-quarters of indigenous peoples in Mexico are poor, and the gap between indigenous and non-indigenous groups is very high; the difference in poverty has been divided into explained and unexplained factors. The explained factors are "the magnitude of the gap attributed to observable characteristics such as education, age, occupation, region of residence, etc." (World Bank, 2005), which account for three-quarters of poverty. The unexplained factors relate to the level of discrimination and explain a quarter of the poverty. Indigenous people in Mexico face significant economic and social disadvantages, and although discrimination against them appears to be decreasing, the government needs to improve education and public services to reduce the poverty gap. Based on its research, the World Bank suggests promoting equal health care access for indigenous peoples "by implementing a head start program focused on maternal and child health," (World Bank, 2005) as well as improving "data collection initiatives for the identification of indigenous populations," (World Bank, 2005) to better monitor progress over time.

== See also ==
- 2011 Mexican protests
- Healthcare in Mexico
