= Pietro Ameglio =

Uruguayan-born Mexican Gandhian civil rights and peace activist

Pietro Ameglio (born 1957) is a Uruguayan-born Mexican civil rights and peace activist known for his advocacy of nonviolence and efforts to promote peace and anti-militarism in Mexico.

In May 2011, he organized demonstrations to support survivor and victim rights amidst ongoing violence in Mexico, following the death of Juan Francisco Sicilia Ortega, son of Javier Sicilia. These demonstrations attracted participants from Mexico and 17 other countries.

Following Gandhian principles, he emphasizes leveraging the positive values and moral sensibilities within Mexican culture to advocate for change from a model of "armed peace" to one of "peace with justice."

In 2014, he was honored as the winner of the El-Hibri Peace Education Prize, the eighth annual Laureate to be selected.

== Civil Resistance and Nonviolent Activism ==
Ameglio has been involved in the promotion of nonviolent direct action strategies and peace education in Mexico and Latin America. In 1987, he co-founded the Mexican chapter of the Peace and Justice Service (Servicio Paz y Justicia, or SERPAJ), a Latin American peace network spanning 12 countries and established by Nobel Peace Prize winner Adolfo Pérez Esquivel.

He worked with poor communities throughout Mexico to promote nonviolent culture, human rights, and peace education. He was also involved in initiatives such as organizing Thinking Out Loud (Pensar en Voz Alta, 1995), a Gandhian-inspired nonviolent action collective, and supporting the Movement for Peace with Justice and Dignity (MPJD, 2011), initiated by poet Javier Sicilia and the families of deceased and missing individuals.

== May 2011 National March for Peace with Justice and Dignity ==
Drawing on Gandhian strategy, Ameglio helped organize some of the largest mass civic actions against violence and war in Mexico. Himself, along with close collaborator Javier Sicilia, served as a main organizer of the National March for Peace with Justice and Dignity (MPJD) in May 2011.

After the death of Sicilia's son on March 28, a cry for social justice was launched under the slogan "We've had it up to here!" ("¡Estoy hasta la madre!"), demanding an end to violence and state complicity in escalating militarism. Ameglio organized an 85-kilometer "Silent March" for survivors and victims of drug-related violence whose suffering had largely been ignored by the public. Between 15,000 and 25,000 protesters joined this four-day march from Cuernavaca to Zócalo where 200,000 people gathered to listen to their testimony.

The protestors also called for an alternative approach to Mexico’s “war strategy” in the escalating war on drugs. Over the four day march, thousands of protestors signed a “Social Pact” calling for the government to enact reforms to bring truth and justice, end the war on drugs, fight corruption and impunity, combat poverty and the crime-based economy, implement economic policies to help the youth, and democratize politics and the media. The movement called for autonomous bodies of peace rather than a call for dialogue with the government, and represented a radical change from a “war strategy” to one of citizen security with respect for human rights. The agreement was signed by civil society organizations on June 10 in Ciudad Juarez.

The movement spurred related protests in 31 Mexican cities and 17 cities across the globe to oppose violence and recognize the dignity of survivors and victims. The largest protest took place in San Cristobal de Las Casas, in the southern State of Chiapas, where 5,000 members of the left-wing Zapatista Army of National Liberation (EZLN) expressed support for the movement, solidarity with victims, and opposition to the armed forces fighting the war on drugs.

Following up on the May 2011 protests, Ameglio worked with the MPJD to create the “Caravan of Consolation” (June 2011) and the “Caravan to the South” (September 2011), which traveled through the areas of northern and southern of Mexico, the hardest hit by the violence. The caravans provided a platform for victims’ families to speak out, to connect with the MPJD and human rights groups, and to become active in the struggle for victims’ rights, and to stop terrorism.

In 2011, he played a key role in organizing a two-day public fast and bi-national encounter in Juarez on the US-Texas border when it was the epicenter of the violence. Prior to this, Ameglio had organized nonviolent direct action outside of military bases (the first of their kind in Mexico) and civil disobedience in defense of the rights of street vendors in Cuernavaca.

As a member of SERPAJ-Morelos and the Latin American Council of Peace Research (CLAIP), Ameglio defended the rights of environmentalists, helping to organize a national ecological civil resistance struggle to save the Casino de la Selva park space in Cuernavaca in the face of a Costco construction project (2001-2004), resulting in his arrest and incarceration as a prisoner of conscience. He has extensive experience in practicing nonviolence with direct actions in Bosnia with “Mir Sada” (1993) and in Chiapas conflict zones (1994-2006) working with peace camps, solidarity caravans, and human rights denunciations.

== Peace Education ==
Born in Uruguay and educated in Mexico, Ameglio completed his undergraduate studies in History at the National Autonomous University of Mexico (UNAM) and earned a Master’s in Contemporary History at the Autonomous University of Morelos (UAEM). He served as Chair of the Humanities Department at La Salle University in Cuernavaca for 18 years.

He held both the Henry D. Thoreau Special Chair and the Spanish Exile Masters–Due Disobedience Special Chair (2008-2014) at the School of Philosophy and Literature at National Autonomous University (UNAM) in Mexico City, and teaches courses on peace pedagogy, civil resistance, and techniques of nonviolence at UNAM and the Universidad del Claustro de Sor Juana. These courses combine peace and nonviolence culture from Gandhi, Thich Nhat Hanh, Donald Hessler, Nelson Mandela, and the Zapatistas. Ameglio uses a methodology of constructing knowledge that draws on Jean Piaget and Juan Carlos Marín.

In alignment with Gandhi's "construction program", he collaborated with indigenous education promoters in the autonomous territories of Chiapas to develop curricula that include their cultural and artistic expressions, as well as their history of social and political struggle. This curriculum is now integrated into the Zapatista autonomous school system.

He is the founder and member of "Thinking Out Loud" (Spanish: Pensar en Voz Alta) (SERPAJ-PICASO), a Gandhian research collaborative that compiles, analyzes and publicizes statistical information on the nature of social conflict in Mexico. SERPAJ-PICASO also promotes nonviolent direct actions through peace camps and anti-militarism protests, and engages the public through expositions about Gandhi and militarism in Mexico. The expositions cover different forms of exclusion, discrimination, violence, and repression of social movements that affect society, especially indigenous groups.

Ameglio also co-founded, with an ecumenical community in 1991, an alternative school called Walking Together in Cuernavaca for children who live or work on the streets to build community solidarity and study to create more human alternatives for their future lives. In 2014, he co-founded the Peace and Nonviolence Team with students in the Philosophy Department at the UNAM.

Pietro is a frequent contributor to conferences, newspapers and magazines, and is author of Gandhi y la desobediencia civil: México hoy (Gandhi and Civil Disobedience: Mexico Today) (Plaza y Valdés, Mexico, 2002), a book on non-violence in Mexico. He co-founded the ecumenical and nonviolence review, Ixtus: Society and Culture with Javier Sicilia in 1991. He has written in La Jornada-Morelos, and also served as Project Coordinator and Research Traveling Exhibition “Racismo y Cultura” (Racism and Culture 1996); “Gandhi: encuentros con la verdad” (Encounters with Truth 1998); “La paz tras el cerco” (where he contributed with the script and video production); “Atenco libre” (2006).

== Recognition ==
2014 – Winner of the annual El-Hibri Peace Education Prize.

2008 - Service of Peace and Justice in Cuernavaca, México. SERPAJ was a recipient of the International Pfeffer Prize, granted for Fellowship of Reconciliation (FOR) at the Festival of Peace (Nyack, NY.)
