= Mexico–Uruguay relations =

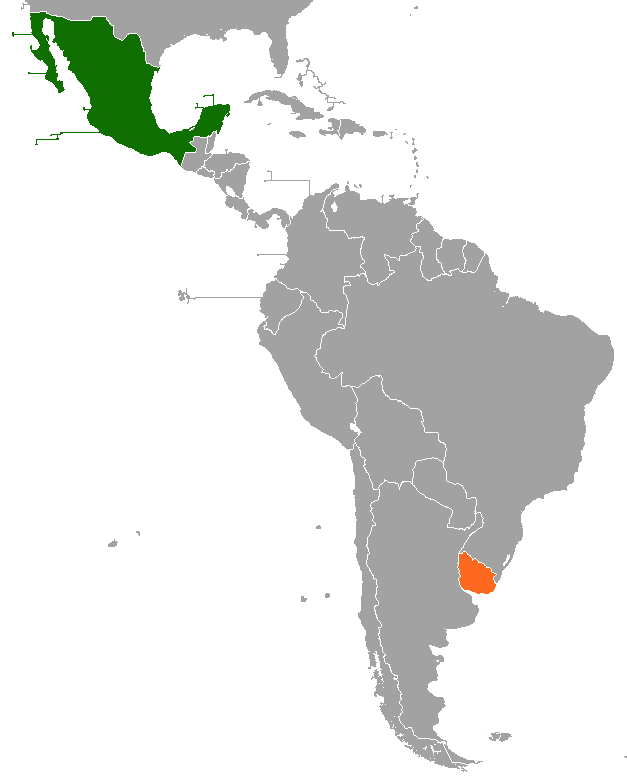

- Mexico: Uruguay

The nations of Mexico and Uruguay established diplomatic relations in 1831. Both nations are members of the Community of Latin American and Caribbean States, Latin American Integration Association, Organization of American States, Organization of Ibero-American States and the United Nations.

== History ==
Historically, both countries were part of the Spanish Empire until the early 19th century. Mexico was part of Viceroyalty of New Spain while Uruguay was part of the Viceroyalty of the Río de la Plata. Soon after independence, both nations established diplomatic relations on 22 February 1831. In 1882, Uruguay established a consulate in Mexico City. In 1941, Mexico elevates its diplomatic mission in Montevideo to an embassy with Uruguay doing so two years later in 1943.

In April 1967, Mexican President Gustavo Díaz Ordaz paid a visit to Uruguay, the first by a Mexican head-of-State. During the 1970s and 1980s, Uruguay went through a Civic-military dictatorship. During that time several dissidents were killed and 'disappeared'. Several hundred Uruguayan citizens applied for asylum at the Mexican Embassy in Montevideo and were soon thereafter relocated to Mexico. In 1985, democracy was restored in Uruguay and in May 1986, Uruguayan President Julio María Sanguinetti paid a State visit to Mexico where he met with President Miguel de la Madrid. There have since been several high-level visits between leaders of both nations.

In August 2009, Mexican President Felipe Calderón traveled to Uruguay on a State visit held by his counterpart President Tabaré Vázquez. In Montevideo, Calderón and Vázquez signed several agreements which were intended to further advance the free trade agreement signed by both nations in 2004. While in Uruguay, President Calderón participated in the Ceibal project, an initiative to provide laptops to schoolchildren and improve internet access, by visiting the school which was to receive the 300,000 laptops in this scheme.

In 2014, the Mexican Government approved granting Uruguayan President José Mujica with the Order of the Aztec Eagle for being exemplary in transforming his country and for advocating defense of universal values for the respect for human rights, democracy and social equality, as well as the promotion of initiatives against poverty, hunger, discrimination and social exclusion. The ceremony was presided and granted to President Mujica by Mexican President Enrique Peña Nieto.

In February 2019, Mexican Foreign Minister Marcelo Ebrard paid a visit to Uruguay where he met with President Vázquez and Foreign Minister Rodolfo Nin Novoa to discuss the ongoing Crisis in Venezuela and presidential crisis and for both nations to mediate in the crisis. Since the meeting, Uruguay has announced its support of incumbent President Nicolás Maduro while Mexico's maintains its neutrality.

In 2023, both nations celebrated 122 years of diplomatic relations.

== High-level visits ==
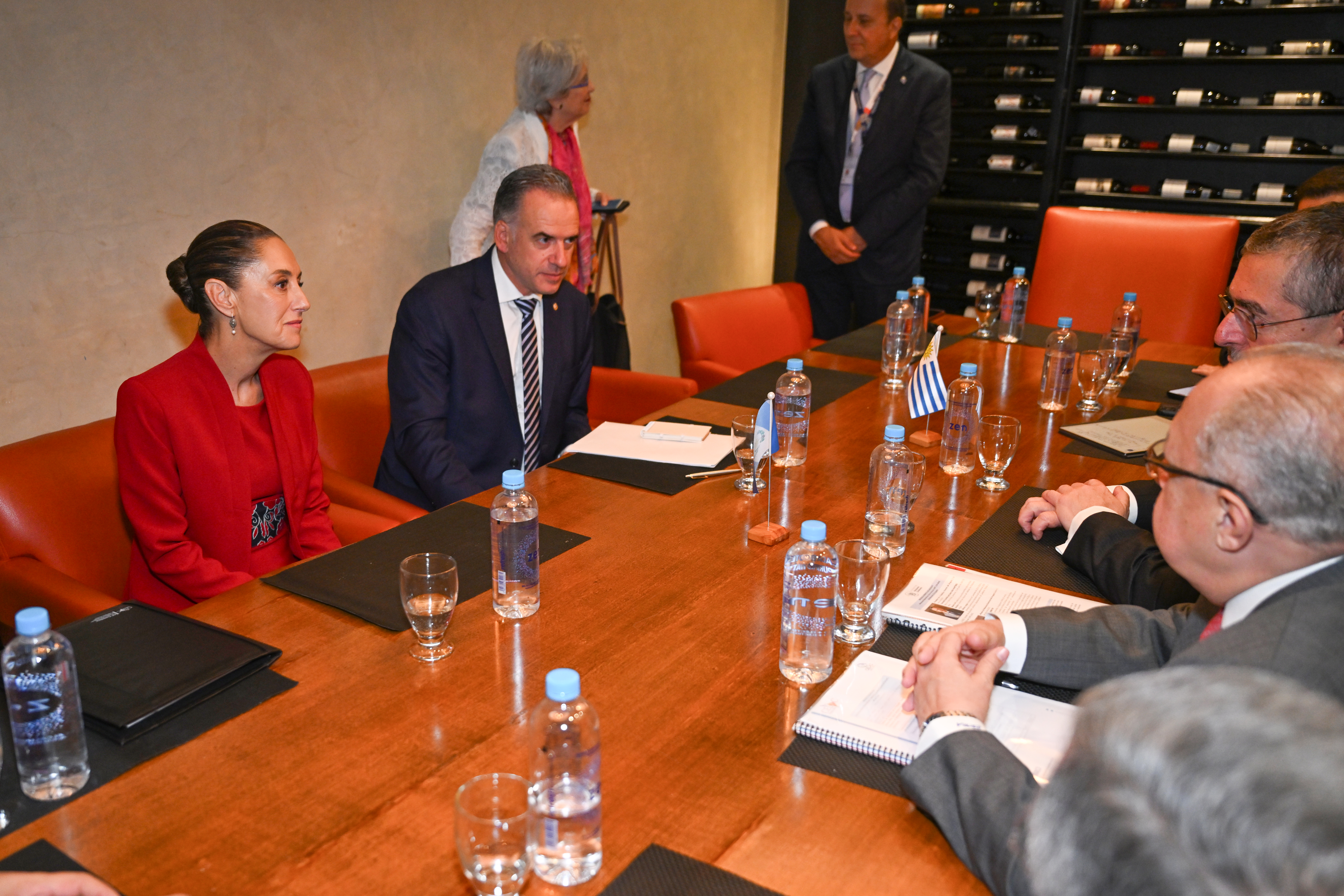
Mexican President Claudia Sheinbaum and Uruguayan President Yamandú Orsi in Tegucigalpa, Honduras; April 2025.

Presidential visits from Mexico to Uruguay

- President Gustavo Díaz Ordaz (1967)
- President Miguel de la Madrid Hurtado (1988)
- President Carlos Salinas de Gortari (1990)
- President Ernesto Zedillo (1999)
- President Vicente Fox (2002, 2006)
- President Felipe Calderón (2009)
- President Enrique Peña Nieto (2013)

Presidential visits from Uruguay to Mexico

- President Julio María Sanguinetti (1986, 1987, 1996, 1999)
- President Luis Alberto Lacalle (1993)
- President Jorge Batlle Ibáñez (2002, January and May 2004)
- President Tabaré Vázquez (2006, 2017, 2018)
- President José Mujica (2011, 2014)
- President Luis Lacalle Pou (2021)

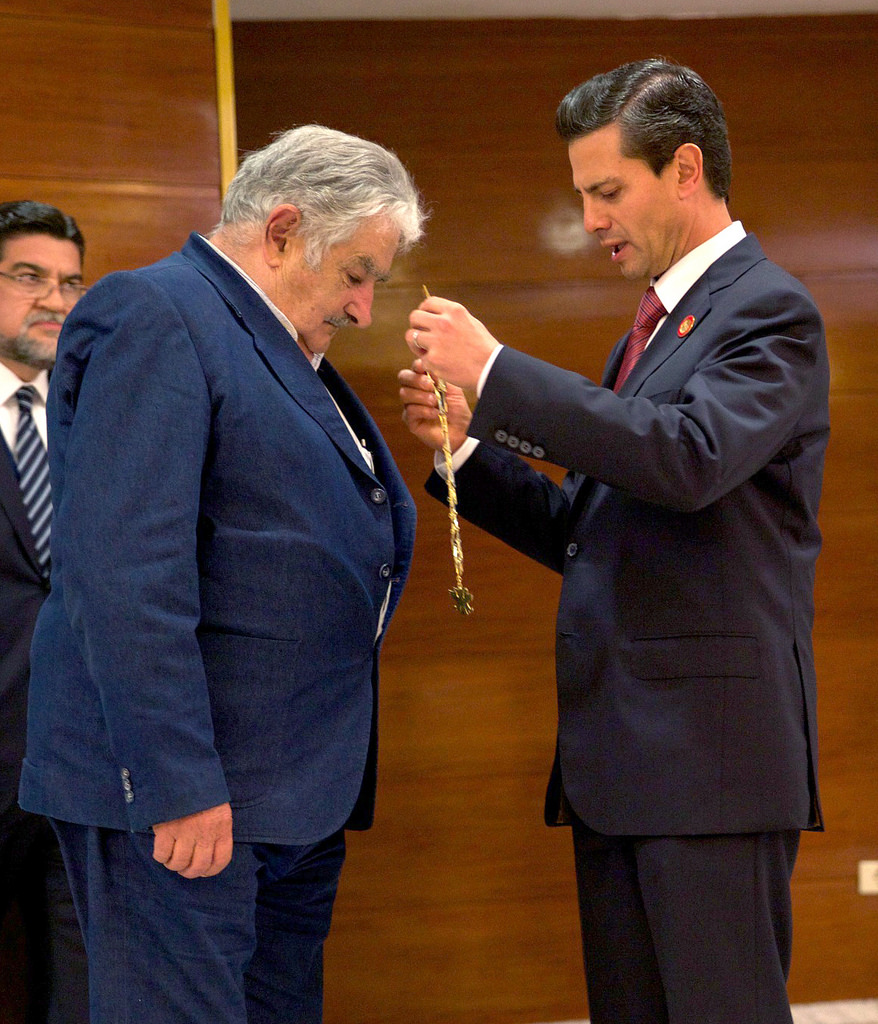
President José Mujica and President Enrique Peña Nieto in Havana, Cuba; 2014.

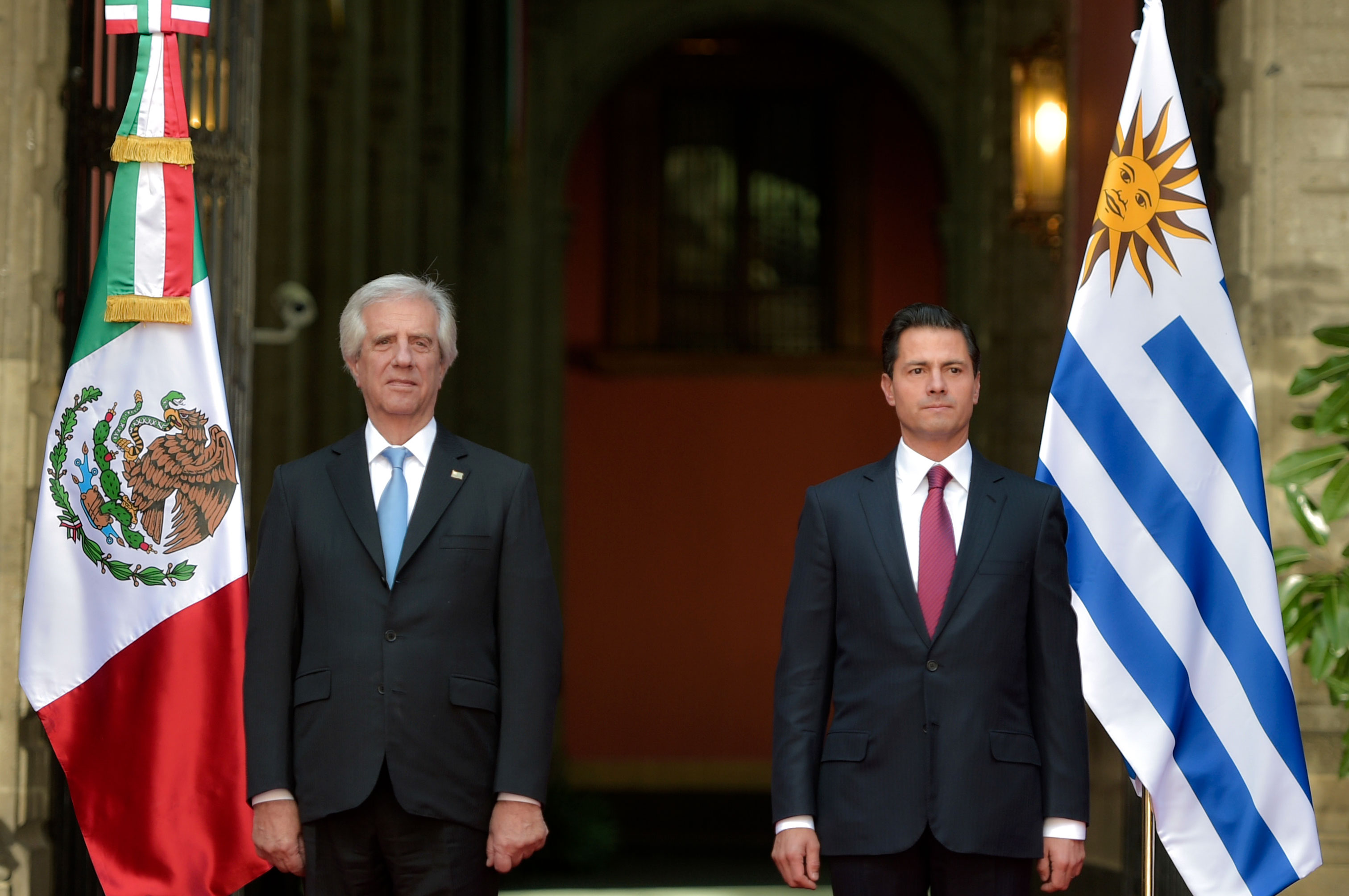
President Enrique Peña Nieto and President Tabaré Vázquez in Mexico City; 2017.

== Bilateral agreements ==
Both nations have signed several bilateral agreements such as an Arbitration Agreement (1902); Agreement on Cultural Exchanges (1985); Agreement on Scientific and Technical Cooperation (1990); Agreement on Tourism Cooperation (1993); Agreement for the Prevention of the Misuse and Repression of Illicit Trafficking of Narcotic Drugs and Psychotropic Substances and their Precursors and Products Essential Chemicals (1996); Extradition Treaty (1996); Agreement for the Promotion and Reciprocal Protection of Investments (1999); Treaty on Mutual Legal Assistance Cooperation in Criminal Matters (1999); Agreement on Air Transportation (2009); Agreement to Avoid Double Taxation and Prevent Tax Evasion in Tax Matters on Income and Equity (2009); Agreement of Cooperation in Protection, Conservation, Recovery and Restitution of Cultural goods (2009) and an Mutual Administrative Assistance and Exchange of Information in Customs Matters (2017).

== Trade ==
In July 2004, both nations signed a free trade agreement. In 2023, trade between the two nations amounted to US$710 million. Mexico's main exports to Uruguay include: vehicles, televisions, tractors, juices and electrical equipment. Uruguay's main exports to Mexico include: packaged beverages, rice, cheese and curd, plywood, leather, wool, cream and other milk based products.

Mexican multinational companies such as América Móvil, Binbit, Gruma, Grupo Bimbo and Grupo Omnilife (among others) operate in Uruguay. Uruguayan companies such as Arkano, Quanam and Vopero operate in Mexico.

== Resident diplomatic missions ==
- Mexico has an embassy in Montevideo.
- Uruguay has an embassy and a consulate-general in Mexico City.

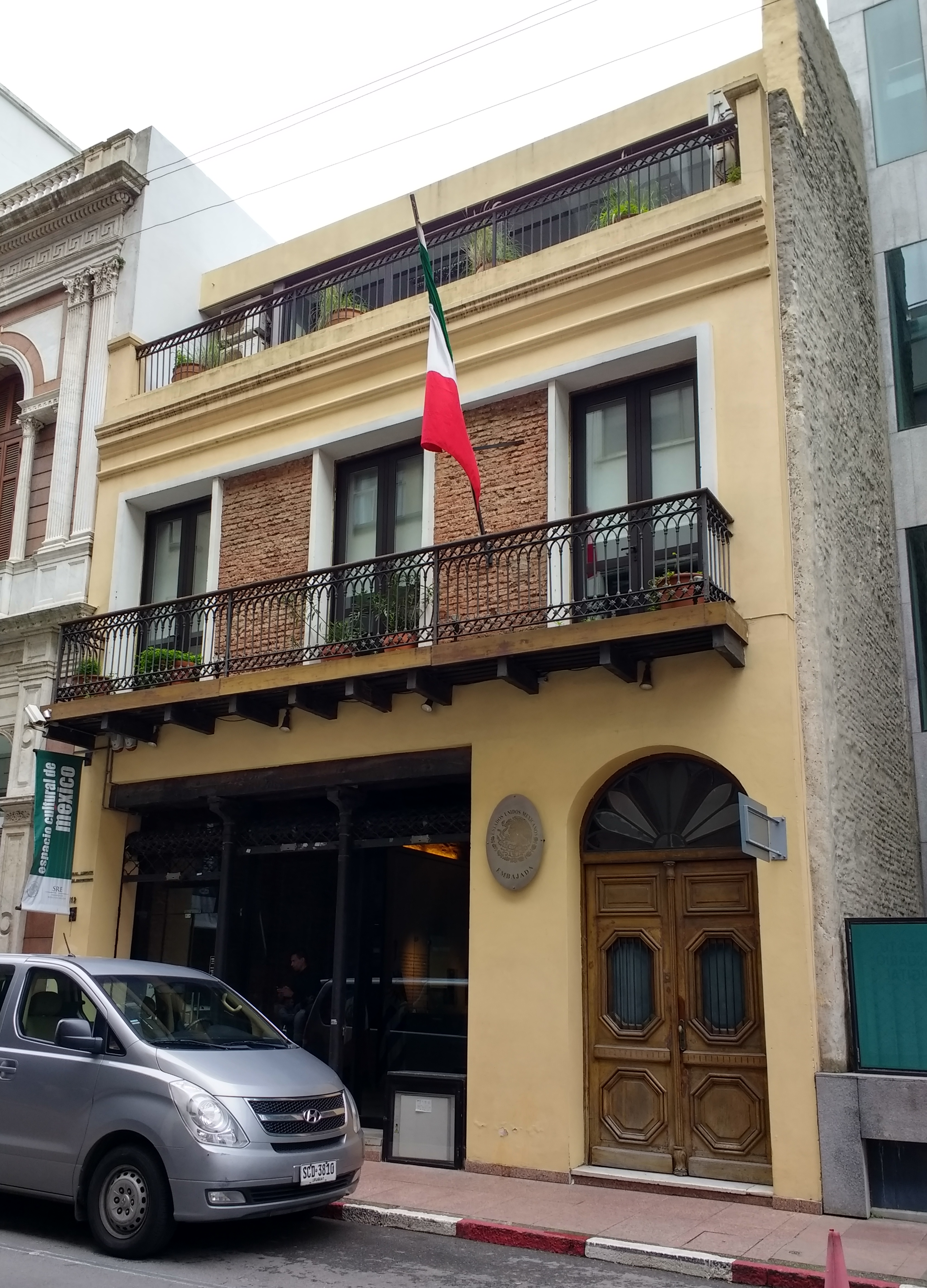
Embassy of Mexico in Montevideo

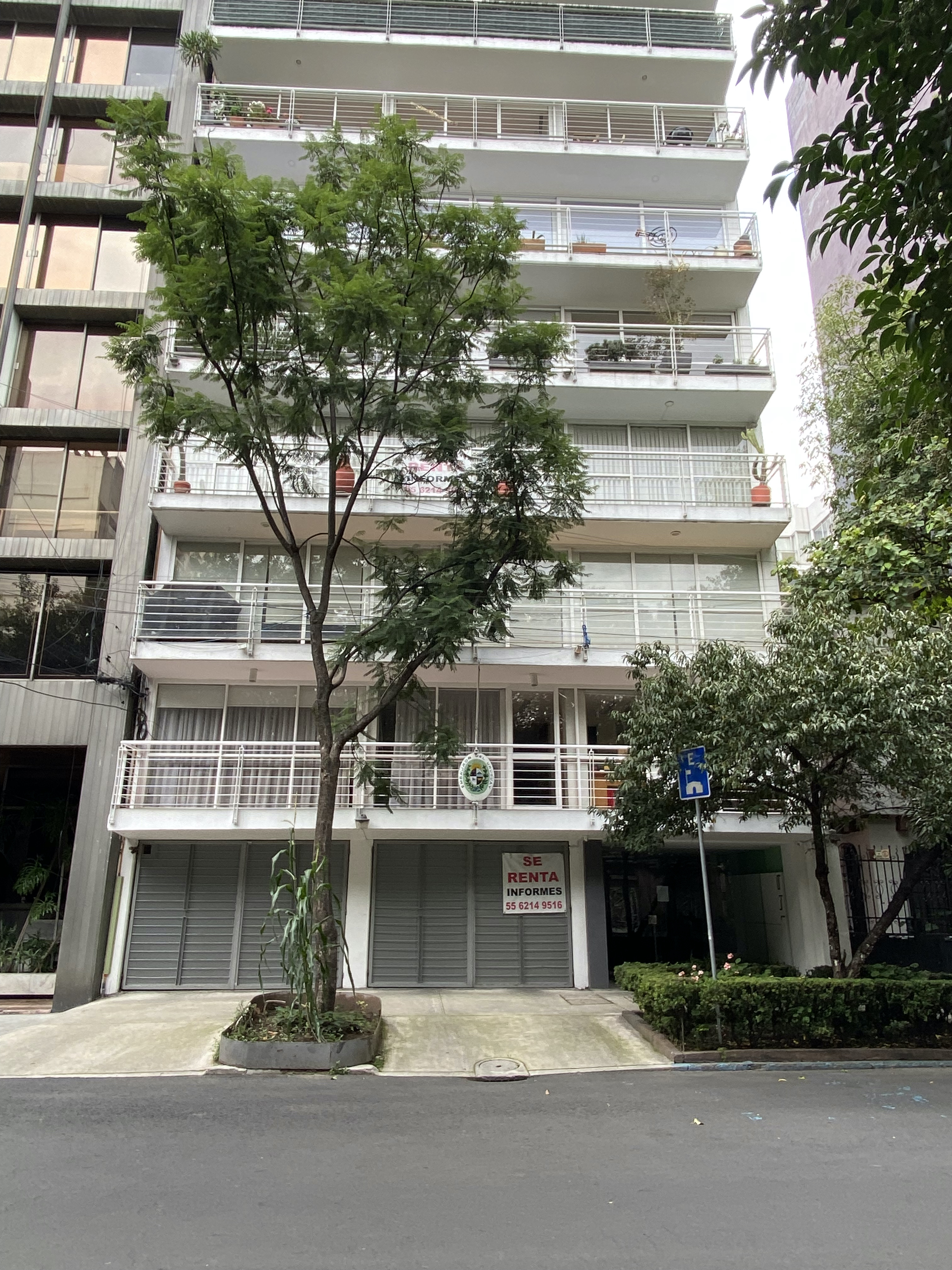
Embassy of Uruguay in Mexico City

== Gallery ==
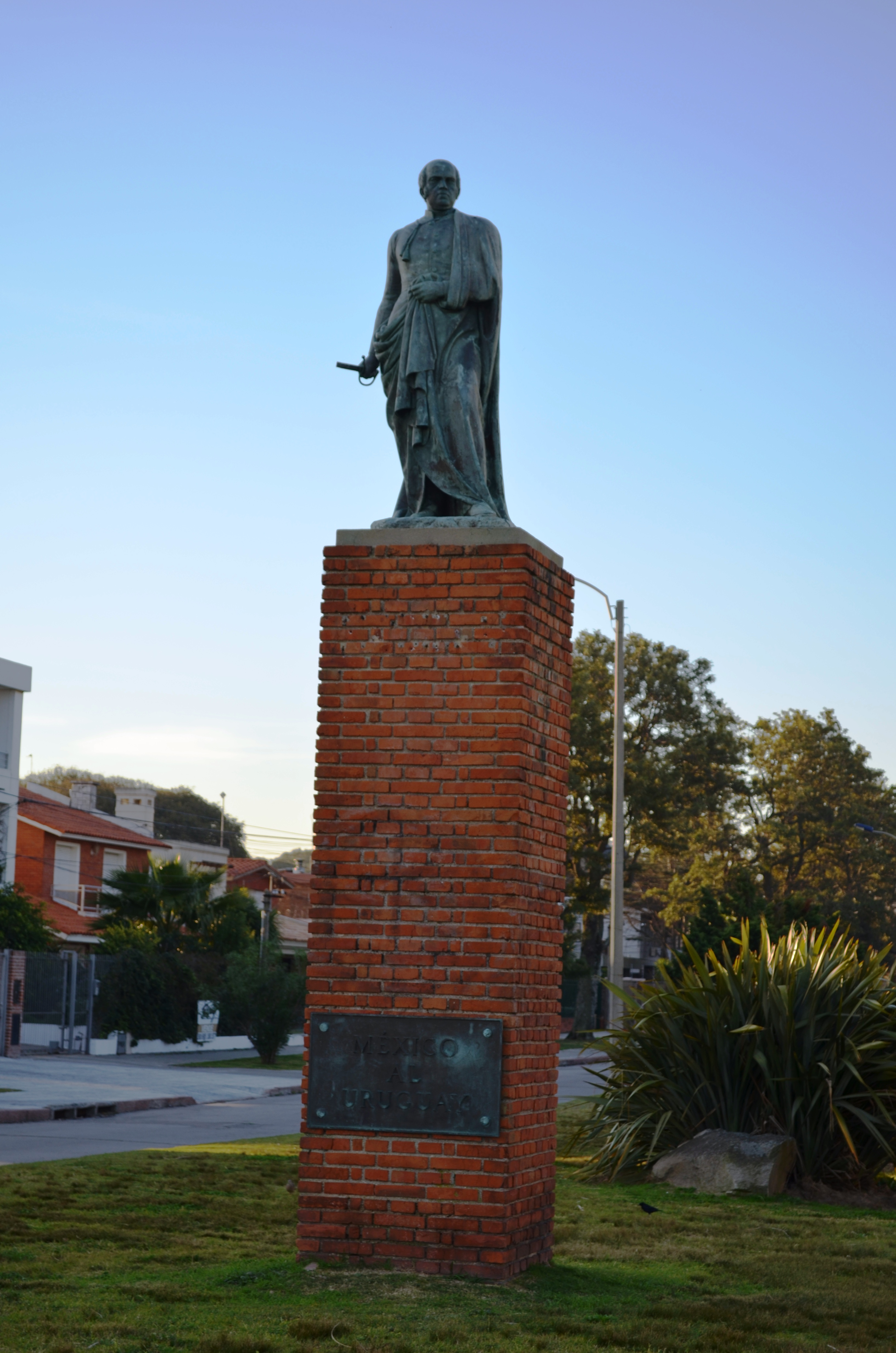
Statue of Mexican Independence leader José María Morelos in Montevideo

Uruguayan Navy ship, the Capitán Miranda, in the port of Veracruz

== See also ==
- Uruguayans in Mexico
