= Aemilia =

Aemilia may refer to:

== People and places in classical history ==
- Aemilia (gens), patrician family of ancient Rome, and the female members of this gens
- Aemilia Tertia (c. 230–163 or 162 BC), third daughter of Lucius Aemilius Paullus, and wife of Scipio Africanus
- Aemilia Hilaria (c. 300–c. 363), ancient Roman physician
- Aemilia Lepida, any of several female members of the gens Aemilia
- Emilia (region of Italy)
- Via Aemilia, a Roman road

== Other uses ==
- Aemilia (moth)
- 159 Aemilia, an asteroid
- Dutch ship Aemilia (1632), a Dutch ship of the line

== See also ==
- Emily (given name)
- Emilia (given name)
