= Amelia S. Givin =

American businesswoman, philanthropist (1845–1915)

Amelia Steele Givin
- Born: Amelia Steele Givin; October 31, 1845; Pennsylvania
- Died: 5 October 1915 (aged 69); Pennsylvania
- Occupation(s): Businesswoman, Philanthropist
- Known for: Businesswoman, Philanthropist, and World Traveler

Amelia Steele Givin (October 31, 1845 – October 5, 1915) (later Mrs. Amelia S. Beall) was a businesswoman, philanthropist, and world traveler from Cumberland County, Pennsylvania. Although her philanthropic ventures were numerous and spanned her lifetime, Givin's most discernible contribution was her funding of the Amelia S. Givin Free Library in her hometown of Mount Holly Springs, Pennsylvania.

== Early life and family ==
Givin grew up with her family near Mount Holly Springs, Pennsylvania, where her father, Robert Givin, and her uncle owned a paper mill. However, in 1865, when Amelia was about age 20, the Givin's house burned down and they moved to Carlisle, PA. Robert Givin was a respected and prosperous businessman and banker, acting as president of both the Mount Holly Paper Mill and the Farmers' Bank in Carlisle. Besides Amelia, Robert and his wife Sara (Gibson) Givin bore four sons, David, James, Samuel, and Robert. When her father died in 1879, thirty-three-year-old Amelia took over his role in running the family mill business. Less than a decade later in 1887, Amelia's mother died and Amelia inherited from her father's large fortune.

== Community involvement ==
Besides meeting the needs of her business, Givin spent much of her time traveling and participating in social pursuits. She and her family were often mentioned in the Carlisle's local newspaper, and Amelia and her mother were both members of Carlisle's Second Presbyterian Church. After Carlisle's Cumberland County Chapter was organized in 1895, Givin became a member of the National Society of the Daughters of the American Revolution. In her later years, Givin frequented the library she had helped to form.

In addition to, and as part of, her social activities, Givin dedicated a significant portion of her life and funds to charitable pursuits. In particular, Givin supported the Carlisle Hospital, the Female Benevolent Society of Carlisle, as well as the Second Presbyterian Church of which she was a member. She included in her will $30,000 for the maintenance of Carlisle Hospital. Givin also left provisions for her household employees and many family members and friends after her death.

== Amelia S. Givin Free Library ==
When Givin was in her late forties, she provided funding for building a free public library in Mount Holly Springs. For members of late 19th-century charitable women's organizations, libraries, in particular, were seen as important institutions for bringing edification to needful communities. To bring improvement to populations with little access to books, free public libraries, often traveling libraries or other informal libraries, such as those located in women's clubhouses, abounded between 1870 and 1930 through the work of civic-minded women. The library of Ms. Givin was far from informal, however. Begun in 1889 and dedicated on January 2, 1890, it had the modern conveniences of electric lights and hot water heating, as well as a fashionable Romanesque Revival structure and ornate interior design. The library took close to $500,000 to build and Givin also provided an endowment.

== Marriage ==
On June 2, 1892, a few years after the library opened, the 46-year-old Givin married Walter Beall of Cumberland, Maryland. To start off their honeymoon, they rode a special car on the Cumberland Valley Railroad on the first leg of their trip to Europe together. They never had any children. Walter died in 1905 and Amelia died close to ten years later at age 69. They were both buried at Ashland Cemetery in Carlisle.
