= Ameli, Eritrea =

Village in Gash-Barka, Eritrea

Ameli أملي
- Village
- Location within Eritrea
- Coordinates: 14°47′36″N 36°56′07″E
- Country: Eritrea
- Region: Gash-Barka
- Time zone: UTC+3

Ameli (Arabic: أملي) is Arabic-speaking village in Gash-Barka, Eritrea.

== Geography ==
The nearest major road is the S-2 located aproxamently 30 kilometres (19 mi) away. Aside from the S-2 roadway, all roads near Ameli are unpaved dirt roads.
