= Amelia Jane =

Fictional character and book series by Enid Blyton

Amelia Jane is a fictional character and book series by Enid Blyton. Her initial book, Naughty Amelia Jane!, was published in 1939. According to Blyton's daughter Gillian, the main character was based on a large handmade doll given to her by her mother on her third birthday.

Books on Amelia Jane:

1. Naughty Amelia Jane (1939)
2. Amelia Jane Again (1946)
3. More About Amelia Jane! (1954)
4. Good Idea, Amelia Jane! (2001)
