= Javier Sicilia =

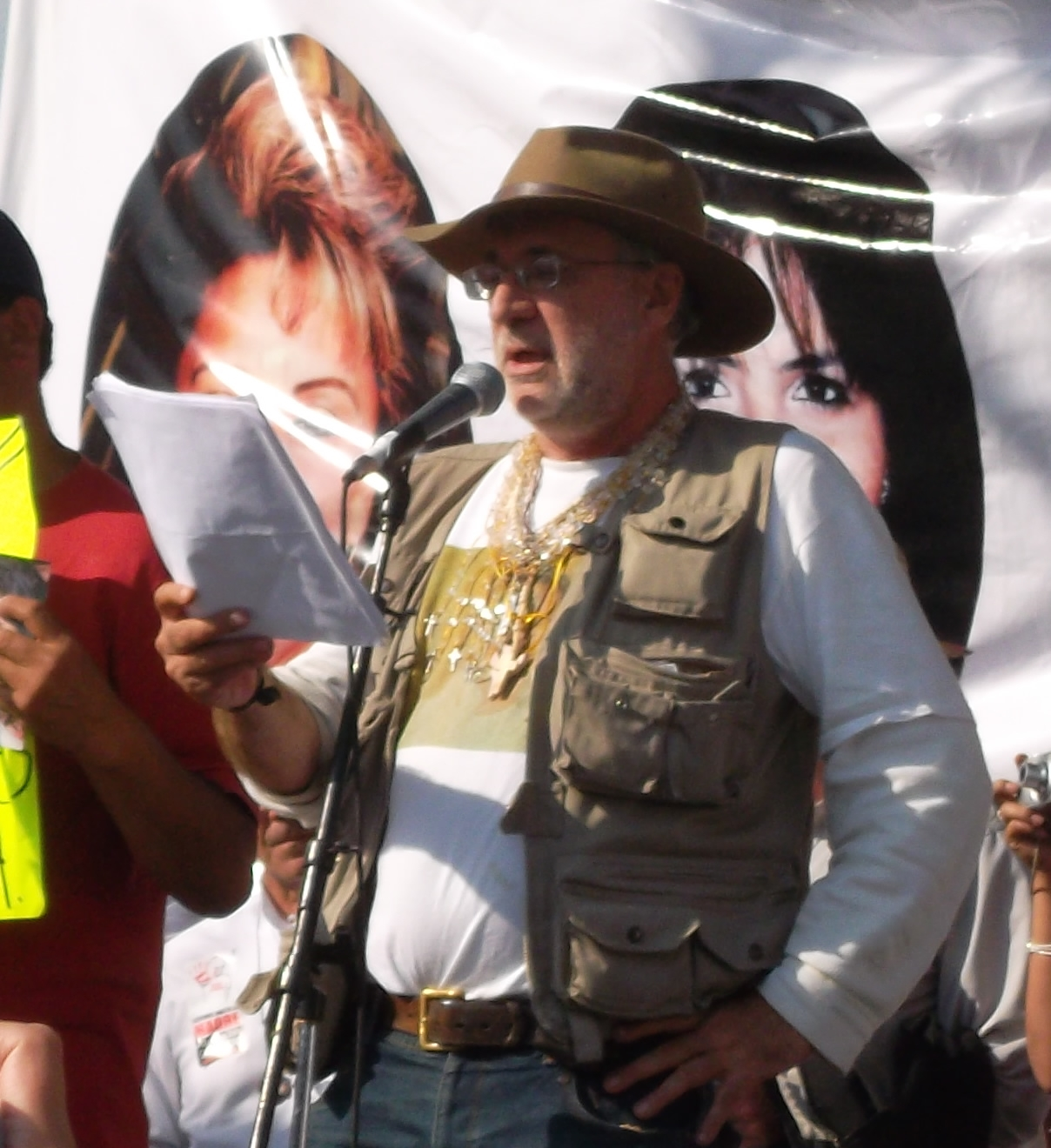

Javier Sicilia (1956, Mexico City) is a Mexican poet, essayist, novelist, peace activist and journalist in Mexico. He contributes to various print media such as the Mexico City daily La Jornada and Proceso magazine. He was founder and director of El Telar ("The Loom"), coordinator of several writing workshops, is a film and television writer, editor of Poesía magazine, a member of the editorial board of Los Universitarios y Cartapacios, the National System of Creators of Art since 1995, and is a professor of literature, aesthetics and screenwriting at Universidad La Salle at Cuernavaca and was director of the now-defunct magazine Ixtus.

== Biography ==
Sicilia inherited his love of literature and poetry from his father, who was also a poet. An avid reader of Saints Teresa of Ávila and John of the Cross, Sicilia is a poet whose themes are linked with Catholicism and Christian mysticism. Later he met the Austrian philosopher Ivan Illich, and Sicilia has since become one of the main promoters of Illich's thought among Mexican intellectuals.

As a contributor to Proceso and as the editor of the magazine "Conspiratio", Sicilia writes about various current philosophical, artistic and literary topics. In 2009 he was awarded the Aguascalientes National Award in Poetry, one of the most prestigious honors in Mexican literature.

In 2011, TIME Magazine named The Protester as its Person of the Year, and Sicilia was profiled in the accompanying "Profiles of Protesters" series for his work in organizing the 2011 Mexican protests.

In January 2013, he met with Mexican president Enrique Peña Nieto to discuss assistance and memorials for victims of violence in Mexico.

== Estamos hasta la madre ("We-have-had-it") protests ==
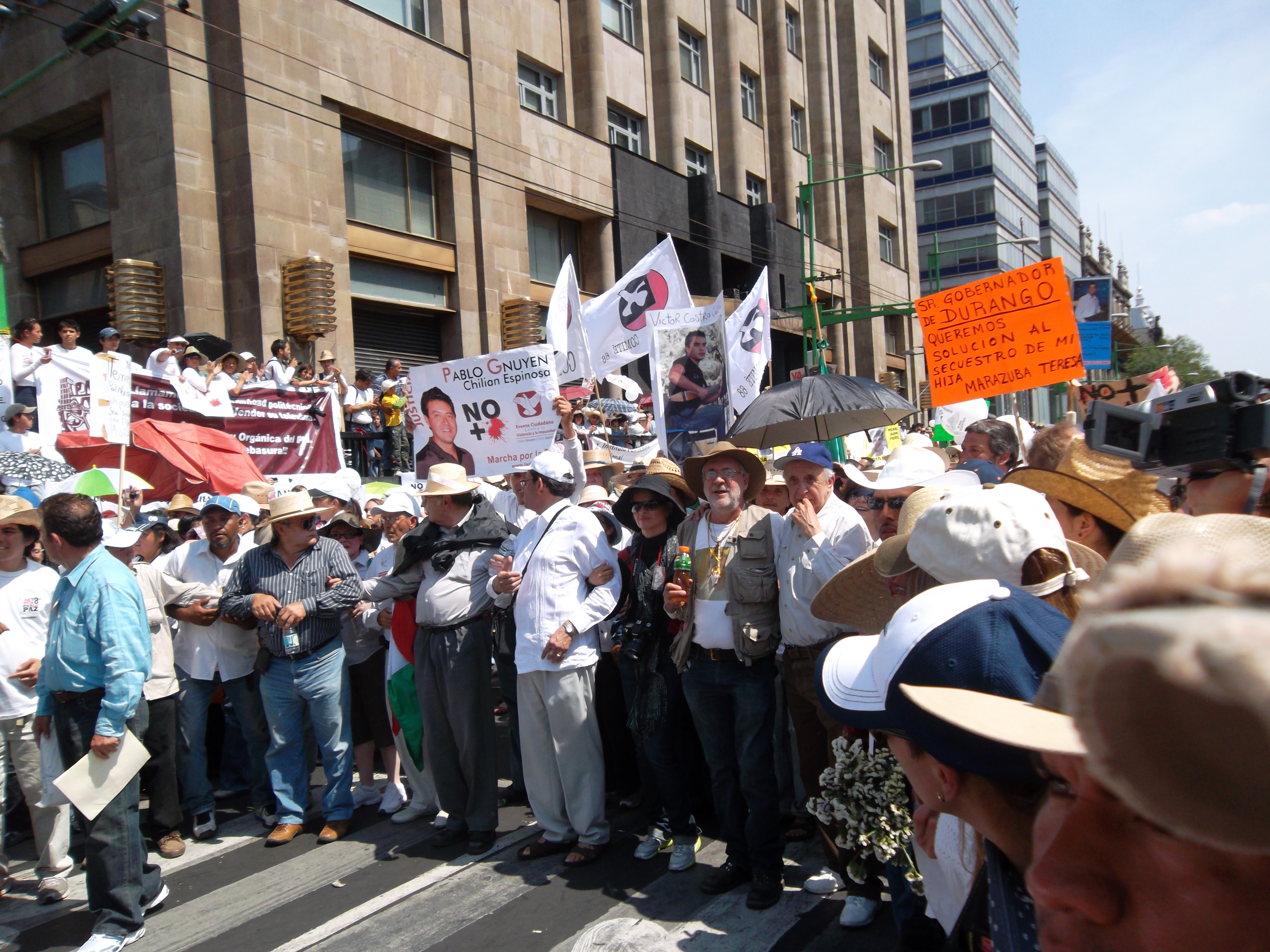

On March 28, 2011, Sicilia's son Juan Francisco Sicilia Ortega was murdered along with six other victims in Temixco, Morelos, Mexico, by drug gang members. Two of Juan Francisco's friends were assaulted by policemen who were working with the Pacífico Sur drug cartel as muggers. The friends reported the attack, and the attackers turned to the Pacífico Sur cartel for help. On March 27, 8 Pacífico Sur cartel members, including an infamous member named El Pelón, kidnapped the two victims as well as four other friends and Juan Francisco from a bar, murdering the group by suffocation. In response, the poet led protests in Cuernavaca with satellites of support held in numerous other places throughout Mexico. The protesters have called for an end to the Drug War, the retreat of military forces from the streets, the legalization of drugs, and the removal of Mexican President Felipe Calderón. Protests have occurred in over 40 Mexican cities, including an estimated 50,000 in Cuernavaca and 20,000 in Mexico City. The rallying cry of "Estamos hasta la madre!" ("We've had it up to here!") was used during these protests.

On April 3, 2011, Sicilia announced in an open letter "To Mexico's Politicians and Criminals" a second protest, a "National March for Justice and against Impunity," which started on May 5, 2011, in Cuernavaca, Morelos, and arrived on May 8 at the Zócalo in Mexico City, where over 200,000 people attended. Before the beginning of his speech, Sicilia demanded that the Mexican President retire Genaro García Luna from his post as Secretary of Public Security. A six-point national pact that searches for the social fabric's refounding was read at the same protest. Other related protests occurred the same day in over 31 Mexican cities and 17 cities over the globe.

== Literary works ==
Poems

- Permanencia en los puertos (1982)
- La presencia desierta (1985)
- Oro (1990)
- Trinidad (1992)
- Vigilias (1994)
- Resurrección (1995)
- Pascua (2000)
- Lectio (2004)
- Tríptico del Desierto (2009)
- Vestigios (2013)

Novels

- El bautista (1991)
- El reflejo de lo oscuro F.C.E. (1998)
- Viajeros en la noche (1999)
- A través del silencio (2002)
- La confesión (2008)
- El fondo de la noche (2012)
- El deshabitado (2016)

Essays

- Cariátide a destiempo y otros escombros (1980)
- Poesía y espíritu (1998)

Biography

- Concepción Cabrera de Armida, la amante de Cristo (2001)
- Félix de Jesús Rougier, la seducción de la Virgen (2007)

== Journalistic works ==
Anthology

- La voz y las sombras (2009)
- Estamos hasta la madre (2011)

== Awards ==
As writer

- 1990 - Ariel Award to Best Original Story, for the film Goitia, un dios para sí mismo (1989)
- 1993 - José Fuentes Mares National Award in Literature, for the novel El Bautista
- 2009 - Aguascalientes National Award in Poetry, for the poetry book Tríptico del desierto

As social activist

- 2011 - People's Choice Honoree for Global Exchange's Human Rights Award
- 2011 - Lion's Heart Medal, given by the University Students' Federation from the University of Guadalajara
- 2011 - Named as a Time Person of the Year, as one of the representatives of "The Protester" figure.
- 2012 - XX National Human Right's Prize "Don Sergio Méndez Arceo"
- 2012 - Voice of the Voiceless Award, given by Annunciation House (El Paso, Tx.)
- 2012 - "La lucha sigue" Award, given by NACLA (New York)
- 2012 - "Personaje del Año" Award (International Section), named by the Bolivian journal El Deber.
- 2013 - "La palabra que busca la paz" (The word that searches for peace) recognition and homage, given at and by the XXIV National Book Fair of Leon (León, Guanajuato, Mexico)

== Additional sources ==
- Shoichet, Catherine E. "."Mexican poet becomes crusader for peace after son's slaying". CNN. 2011-05-05. " CNN. May 5, 2011.
- https://web.archive.org/web/20120323132522/http://www.elcautivo.org/041115/V2/Pag_V2.htm (in Spanish)
- https://web.archive.org/web/20120323132526/http://www.elcautivo.org/041115/V3/Pag_V3.htm (in Spanish)
- http://amediavoz.com/sicilia.htm (in Spanish)
- http://www.periodicodepoesia.unam.mx/index.php?option=com_content&task=view&id=48&Itemid=77 (in Spanish)
- http://www.eluniversal.com.mx/notas/574474.html (in Spanish)
- Jiménez Serrano, Martín. El lenguaje místico de Permanencia en los puertos de Javier Sicilia (doctoral thesis). México, 2009 (in Spanish)
- Polsgrove, Carol. "Javier Sicilia: Writing His Way Back to Life". https://latinamericanwriters.com/2017/10/16/javier-sicilia-writing-his-way-back-to-life/
- Riley Luisa, Canal 22/Televisión Metropolitana. Javier Sicilia, en la soledad del otro.https://www.proceso.com.mx/358567/documental-sobre-javier-sicilia-cuando-el-cine-se-acerco-a-la-soledad-del-dolor
