= D'Alelio =

D'Alelio is a surname. Notable people with the surname include:

- Massimo D'Alelio (1916–1998), Italian bridge player
- Sarah D'Alelio (born 1980), American mixed martial artist
