= Amelia Perrier =

Irish novelist and travel writer

- Born: 1841; Cork
- Died: 1875 (aged 33–34); Sussex

Amelia Perrier (1841–1875) was an Irish novelist and travel writer.

== Early life and education ==
Amelia Perrier was born to John Johnston Perrier and Anna Browne in 1841 in Cork (city). Her father was a barrister in Cork but after he died, the family moved to London. Perrier worked as a journalist and novelist. Initially the novels she wrote received positive reviews but her health began to fail after the death of her brother in 1872. He had suffered through a long and painful illness. To recover her own health Perrier traveled to Morocco. On her return she wrote a travel book. However it also turned out that she was suffering from consumption. Although she was successful in her application to the Royal Literary Fund, Perrier died in Sussex two years later.

== Bibliography ==
- Mea Culpa (1869)
- A Good Match (1872)
- A Winter in Morocco (1873)
