= Movement for Peace with Justice and Dignity =

Protest against the Mexican Drug War

- Date: 28 March 2011 – present (15 years, 3 months, 2 weeks and 3 days)
- Location: Throughout Mexico
- Caused by: Mexican drug war, government and corporate corruption, regressive economic policies, economic and social inequality, poverty, among others
- Goals: Drug legalization, social democracy, among others
- Methods: Demonstration, occupation, protest, protest march, street protesters, picketing, civil disobedience, strike actions
- Status: Ongoing

The Movement for Peace with Justice and Dignity (MPJD) (Spanish: Movimiento por la Paz con Justicia y Dignidad) is an ongoing protest movement that began on 28 March 2011 in response to the Mexican drug war, government and corporate corruption, regressive economic policies, and growing economic inequality and poverty. The protests were called by Mexican poet Javier Sicilia in response to the death of his son in Cuernavaca. The protesters have called for an end to the Drug War, the legalization of drugs, and the removal of then-President of Mexico Felipe Calderón. Protests have occurred in over 40 Mexican cities, including an estimated 50,000 in Cuernavaca and 20,000 in Mexico City.

The protests continued in Cuernavaca on 5 May, when over 600 marched against the Drug War.

The movement headed by Sicilia may have had a role in the rejection in 2011 of a reform to the National Security Act that would have granted more attributions related to public security to the Mexican Armed Forces.

== Events ==
=== May 2011 protests ===
Following Javier Sicilia's sons death on 28 March, and open letter "To Mexico's Politicians and Criminals" a silent protest took place in Zócalo, Mexico City on 8 May. The protest began in Cuernavaca, Morelos where more than 200,000 protesters walked 100 km to Mexico City. Some protesters were covered in blood, while others carried pictures of their dead family members. The slogans in these protests include "Estamos hasta la madre!" ("We've had it!") and "No más sangre" ("No more blood").

=== 5 September 2011 ===
On 5 September 2011, President Felipe Calderon gave the fifth state of the nation address since his contested election in 2006. More than 50,000 people attended a demonstration to the Zócalo main square in Mexico City. More than half the square has been occupied since May 2011.

=== The 15 October Movement ===
Demonstrations occurred throughout Mexico as part of the 15 October 2011 global protests. Hundreds of people marched at the Monument to the Revolution at one of the smaller protests of the day. This protest was connected to the world Occupy Movement, which although centres around the world financial imbalance, carries multiple causes. The protest held in Mexico contained signs that read; No blood or STOP the war on drugs.

=== Meeting with Cabinet ===
The organizers of the main protests, also known as the Movement for Peace with Justice and Dignity were able to voice their concerns to the Federal Cabinet in June 2011. In response to the protests anti-military concerns Calderon explained "Violence does not occur in a particular place because the Federal Forces are there. The opposite is true: the Federal Forces are there because that is where there is violence. It is the violence of criminals that kill and abduct rather than the state's response to combat them that has caused this situation."

== Goals ==
The main goals of these protests are to 'pull the army off the streets', decrease the death number specifically of innocent bystanders by ensuring the safety of citizens. The protesters are not in favour of President Calderon's drug-cartel dismantling policies, namely his national security strategy creating 'militarization of the war on drugs', where cities became reminiscent of battle grounds between battling cartel and government militia.

=== Controversies ===
Despite the many deaths of political figures, the protesters brought to light the heavy civilian death toll, carrying pictures of loved ones who have been killed in the country's drug related violence. The numbers are not concrete due to lack of police records and discrepancy but estimates place the number to the tens of thousands. This discrepancy points to police corruption as authorities are being accused of "under-reporting the number of deaths or deliberately changing the details of those killed to make it appear that the victims are criminals rather than civilians".

Additionally, Calderon's National Security Strategy was heavily debated as it sanctions 'warrantless searches, the detention of suspects without charges; the collection of intelligence and counterintelligence "using any method; and electronic surveillance of citizens".

=== National Pact ===
A Nation Pact, signed 14 June was a collaborate effort to set out an outline for the civilians demands. These demands follow the outline of the goals of the protests and include ' giving more visibility to the victims of violence and their families, ending the administration's "militarized approach" to combating crime, punishing corruption and impunity, working to address the social and economic causes of organized crime.'

== International impact ==
The influence and growth of these protests have led to smaller demonstrations held in cities all over the world. Cities with Mexican sub-communities such as Barcelona, Buenos Aires, Madrid, Montreal, The Hague, and Frankfurt have held their own protests in support of crisis in Mexican cities. Protests were also coordinated in Washington, D.C., as U.S. policy supports and supplies Calderon's policies.

== See also ==
- Arab Spring
- Occupy movement
- 15 October 2011 global protests
- 2011 Spanish protests
- Civil disobedience
- Corruption Perceptions Index
- Corporatism
- Corporatocracy
- Economic inequality
- Grassroots movement
- Oligarchy
- Plutocracy
- Zapatista Army of National Liberation
