= Amelia Keane =

American politician

Member of New Hampshire House of Representatives for Hillsborough 31
- In office 2016–2018
- Succeeded by: Manny Espitia

Personal details
- Party: Democratic

Amelia Keane is an American politician. She was a member of the New Hampshire House of Representatives.
