= Amelia, West Virginia =

Unincorporated community in West Virginia, United States

- Unincorporated community
- Location in West Virginia and the United States Amelia (the United States)
- Coordinates: 38°17′21″N 81°17′45″W
- Country: United States
- State: West Virginia
- County: Kanawha
- Elevation: 1,217 ft (371 m)
- Time zone: UTC-5 (Eastern (EST))
  - Summer (DST): UTC-4 (EDT)
- GNIS ID: 1549564

Amelia is an unincorporated community in Kanawha County, West Virginia, united states.
