= Amelia Lambrick =

Australian public servant, pacifist and social reformer

- Born: 23 March 1864; North Melbourne, Victoria, Australia
- Died: 27 September 1956 (aged 92); Malvern East, Victoria, Australia
- Occupations: Public servant, peace activist, and social reformer.
- Organization: Women's International League for Peace and Freedom

Amelia Lambrick (23 March 1864 – 27 September 1956) was an Australian public servant, pacifist, and social reformer. She was President of the Women's International League for Peace and Freedom.

== Life and work ==
Amelia Lambrick was born on 23 March 1864 in North Melbourne, Australia, the eldest of five children of Erasmus Pascoe Lambrick and Amelia (née Bertram). Her parents had been born in Cornwall and Norfolk, England, emigrating to Australia during the 1830s.

Lambrick began working for the Victorian public service in 1886 and, following various positions in the Postmaster General's Department, worked in the Customs Department for 37 years.

Lambrick was a member of the Theosophical Society (for whom she lectured), the Woman's Christian Temperance Union, the Women's International League for Peace and Freedom (of which she was President of the Victorian branch 1932–36), and the Victorian Citizens' Movement. She lectured for Vida Goldstein's 1910 election campaign, and contributed to the Socialist using the pseudonym 'Hypatia'.

During the 1920s and 1930s, Lambrick travelled widely and lectured extensively, including in France, Belgium, Italy, Switzerland, and the British Isles. In 1926, she represented Australia at the congress of the Women's International League for Peace and Freedom in Dublin, Ireland. A lifelong advocate of peace, she also lectured on nonviolent leaders, such as Mahatma Gandhi and Toyohiko Kagawa.

Lambrick died at her home at Malvern East on 27 September 1956, and was cremated.

== Philosophy ==
Lambrick was drawn to theosophy, and believed firmly in the concept of universal brotherhood, which underpinned her activism. She said: "Peace stands for truth, justice, brotherhood, and these are the foundations of all true civilisation".
