= Amelia Elizabeth Roe Gordon =

British-born Canadian temperance activist

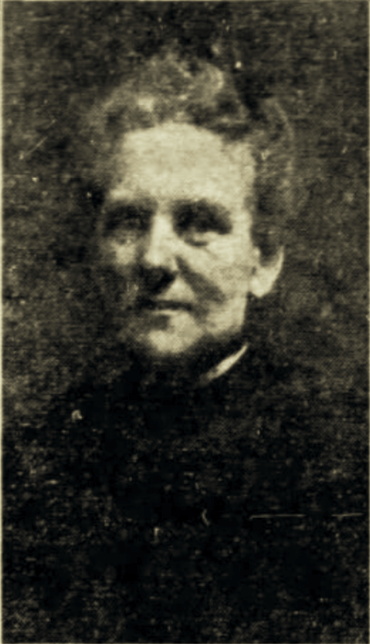
- Born: Amelia Elizabeth Roe Gee; 11 April 1851; Liverpool, England
- Died: 6 June 1932 (aged 81); Columbus, Ohio, U.S.
- Education: Royal Victoria College for Women (now, McGill University)
- Occupations: reformer; activist
- Title: President, Dominion Woman's Christian Temperance Union
- Spouse: Asa Gordon (m. 1877)
- Children: 2

Amelia Elizabeth Roe Gordon (née Gee; 11 April 1851 – 6 June 1932) was a British-born Canadian temperance activist, who was elected president of the Ontario Woman's Christian Temperance Union (W.C.T.U.) (1927) before serving as president of the Dominion W.C.T.U. She was also a suffragist, and was associated with philanthropic, benevolent, and social reform.

== Estimations of year of birth ==
Amelia Elizabeth Roe Gee was born in Liverpool, England on 11 April 1851. Her birth was registered in June 1851. According to Gordon's death certificate, she was 80 years, 1 month, and 26 days old at death. According to Gordon's obituary in The Gazette (1932), Gordon was 85 years old when she died, making her year of birth at 1847. According to Cherrington (1926), she was born 11 April 1858.

However, her birth was registered in 1851, according to the General Registry Office of England and Wales, making her 81 at the time of her death.

== Early years and education ==
Her father, Edward Gee, brought the family to Canada in 1860. He founded a tea and spice import business in Montreal. She was educated in the Canadian public schools and at the Royal Victoria College for Women, Montreal (now, McGill University).

== Career ==
Besides holding membership and responsible positions in various civic and philanthropic societies, Gordon was an officer connected with the King’s Daughters, the Young Women's Christian Association, and the Home for the Friendless. She also served as an officer with the District, Provincial, Dominion, and World's W.C.T.U. When Lady Aberdeen was President of the National Council of Women of Canada, Gordon served as Secretary.

In religion, Gordon was a Methodist. She was active in evangelistic work. She served as Evangelistic Superintendent, of the Dominion of Canada from 1900 to 1918, and as World’s W.C.T.U. Superintendent of Evangelistic work among Soldiers from 1900 to 1910. In 1915, she was elected president of the W.C.T.U. for the district of Ottawa.

For a number of years, she edited the White Ribbon Bulletin, official organ of the Dominion W.C.T.U., and was also charged with the preparation of the Bible Readings for use in the regular meetings of the organization. She also lectured, besides taking an active part in local and Dominion campaigns.

== Personal life ==
In 1877, she married Asa Gordon (1846-1933), K.C., an Ottawa barrister. The couple had one son, Asa, and one daughter, Florence.

Amelia Elizabeth Roe Gordon died in Columbus, Ohio, U.S., on 6 June 1932, aged 81, after suffering a heart seizure, at a convention of the International Order of the King's Daughters and Sons, and was buried in Ottawa, where she had been a long-time resident.
