= Amelia M. Starkweather =

American writer

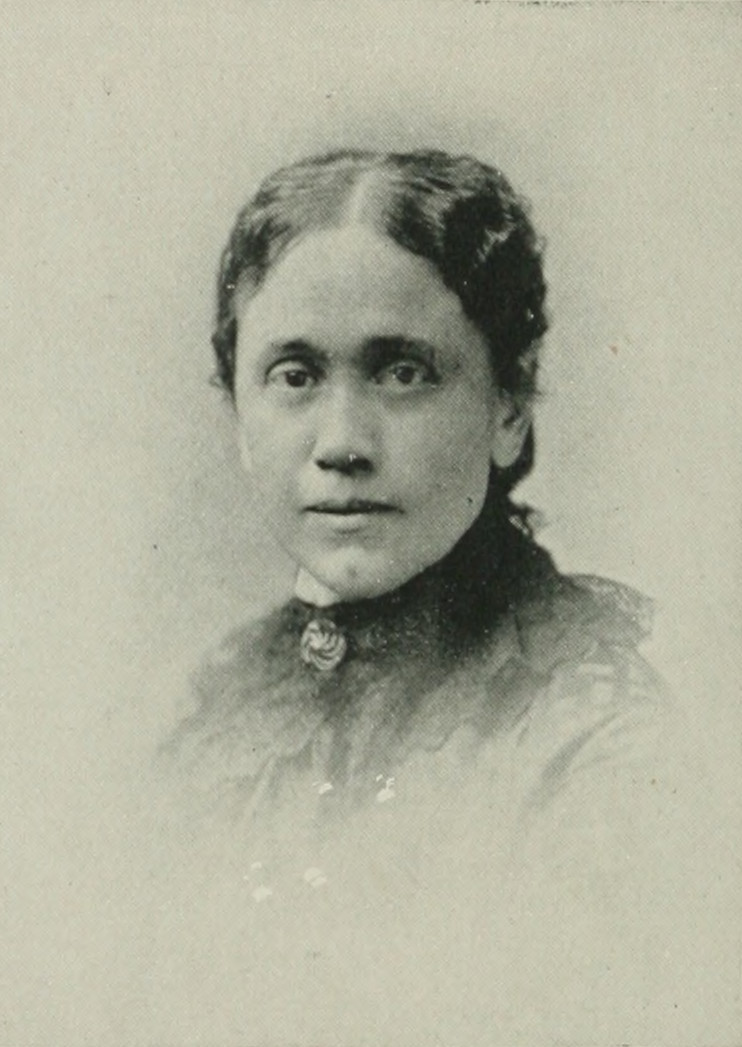
- Photo in A Woman of the Century
- Born: Amelia Minerva Starkweather; July 9, 1840; Starkville, New York, U.S.
- Died: March 28, 1926 (aged 85); East Providence, Rhode Island, U.S.
- Occupations: Educator, author
- Spouse: Jacob Flint Starkweather (m. 1910)
- Writing career
- Language: English
- Notable works: Tomtits and Other Bits; Leaves from the City Beautiful

Amelia Minerva Starkweather (née Starkweather; July 9, 1840 – March 28, 1926) was an American educator and author who was a lifelong worker in philanthropic and charitable enterprises, and highly successful in evangelistic meetings. In addition to her teaching career, she worked as a traveling financial agent for Children's Home and Old People's Home, served as a superintendent of a Sunday school with 400 students, gave lectures and was engaged in evangelistic work. She was active in Sunday school, literary societies, church and prayer meetings, developing literary entertainments for church and Sunday school, and reading at such places. She wrote many hymns which appeared in Sunday school song books and temperance songs with music by Edna G. Young. Starkweather was the author of a children's book, Tomtits and Other Bits and a volume of poems, Leaves from the City Beautiful, as well as two leaflets, Inasmuch, and His Eye Is On Me;

== Early life and education ==
Amelia Minerva (or Minerver) Starkweather was born in Starkville, New York, July 9, 1840. Her parents were Merritt and Hannah (Saunders) Starkweather. She had at two siblings, a sister, Harriet Starkweather Osborn, and a brother, William Henry Starkweather. She was a descendant of Robert Starkweather, first of the name in the United States. At the age of four years, she removed with her parents to Bergen, New York.

She began her school career in the district school, and her advancement was rapid. While attending the Cary Collegiate Seminary in Oakfield, New York (in 1858 and other years), her love of poetry and poetic composition attracted the attention of the teachers and patrons of the school. Before she had finished her graduating course, she was stricken with inflammation of the eyes, which left them in a chronic state of weakness.

She graduated from the Chautauqua Literary and ScientificCircle in the pioneer class of 1882.

== Career ==
For several years, she retired almost entirely from society, pursuing however, although with difficulty, her vocation as teacher, which she began at the age of fifteen. and for which she gained a reputation for efficiency and faithfulness.

Her first poem was published in the Progressive Batavian, and many poems followed in various periodicals. From time to time she was offered the principalship of the several schools in the city, but she could not quite make up her mind to give up the care of the little ones, especially as the charge of this department afforded her more leisure out of school for writing.

After some years spent in successful teaching in New York, she removed to Pennsylvania and accepted a position in the primary department of the public schools of Titusville. There, she found more time for literary pursuits, as well as time for Sunday school and other Christian work, to which she was especially devoted. During the period of 1876 until 1884, she served as superintendent of a large Sunday school with 400 students, 40 teachers, and officers, in Titusville. By her personal visits and labor, many poor children were sought out, clothed and taken to the school.

The various literary entertainments which she prepared and presented to the public were models of their kind. During her residence in Titusville, she entered the lecture field and was received favorably, lecturing from pulpit and platform several times weekly. For three years, she served as president of the Home Missionary Society, and was actively connected with the Woman's Christian Temperance Union, being for some time county superintendent of juvenile work and other departments of benevolent and reformatory work.

She continued to write, including a large number of hymns, poems for children, and short stories in prose. In 1885, she prepared and published through a leading firm of Boston, her volume entitled, Tom Tits and Other Bits. In these poems and stories, the author has shown a gift in representing the playful moods of children, and in picturing them to readers. "The Robin" was written as a recitation for a little girl friend, and was adapted to bring out a sweet bird trill, of which she was master. The two songs, "The Cricket" and "The Owl," became quite popular in the public schools. Her hymns were set to music and published in the Sunday-school song books.

When Starkweather's health demanded a change of occupation, she left Titusville to become engaged as financial agent for the Western New York Home for Friendless Children. Feeling drawn for several years toward the missionary field, she entered the Deaconess home of the Methodist Episcopal Church at Buffalo, New York, and six months later went as superintendent of the Deaconess home of Brooklyn, New York.

== Personal life ==
For a part of her life, Starkweather made her home with her sister, Mrs. Harriet Starkweather Osborn, at Basom, New York, although summer months were usually spent in her cottage at Chautauqua, New York.

On October 6, 1910, at the age of 70, she married Jacob Flint Starkweather, age 74. At the time, she was a resident of New Haven, Connecticut, and he of Norwich, Connecticut. They had been acquainted for many years through a mutual interest in the genealogy of the Starkweather family. After the ceremony, they left for the West, where the husband engaged in business. Eventually, they made their home in Norwich. She was a member of the Baptist Church after marriage. She favored women's suffrage, and was a prohibitionist.

She died on March 28, 1926, at East Providence, Rhode Island, age 85.

== Selected works ==
=== Books ===
- Tomtits and other bits, 1885
- Leaves from the city beautiful , 1912

=== Leaflets ===
- Inasmuch
- His Eye Is On Me

=== Hymns ===
- As Jesus walked the stormy waves
- As you gather round your table
- Cast thy care upon the Savior
- Come, Holy Spirit, search my heart
- Has the day been dark with shadows
- He that dwelleth in the presence of the Highest
- I am never alone, though the shadows
- I will look to the hills, to the beautiful hills
- I'd rather get down at the feet of my Lord
- I'd rather have that noble guide
- If the great day has come
- I'm abiding in Christ, where no sea billows roll
- Now I lay me down to sleep, While slumbers
- Our Father's way is always best
- Remember your Creator, Now in the time of youth
- There's a joy in my soul that doth daily increase
- There's a peace in my heart, that each day deeper grows
- Though clouds be dark and storms arise
- Toil on though the night
- When I shall reach the golden
- When I stand in yonder city
- When we rest on yonder shore
