= Pathways (video game) =

2025 video game

- Title screen
- Developers: Shout Out UK; East Riding of Yorkshire Council; Hull City Council
- Publisher: Shout Out UK
- Platform: Web-based
- Release: 2023
- Genre: Educational

Pathways is a 2023 video game developed by Shout Out UK that emphasizes the "Prevent" aspect of the Home Office's CONTEST counter-terrorism strategy. Pathways was the subject of significant criticism from media outlets in 2026. The character Amelia, used in the game to illustrate exposure to far-right views, was appropriated by online communities and reproduced in memes and AI-generated images.

== Overview ==
Pathways stars a male or female (Note: The player can choose whether Charlie appears as a male or female, with both designs being shown on the game's landing page. The in-game text largely uses "they/them" pronouns.) protagonist named Charlie, whose reactions to different situations are chosen by the player. In some levels, Charlie is courted by their classmate Amelia, a nationalist teenage girl from Bridlington with purple hair.

== Development ==
The "Pathways Learning Package" was marketed as a free learning package for "Navigating Gaming, The Internet & Extremism". SOUK developed it in coordination with the East Riding of Yorkshire Council and the Hull City Council.

== Reception ==
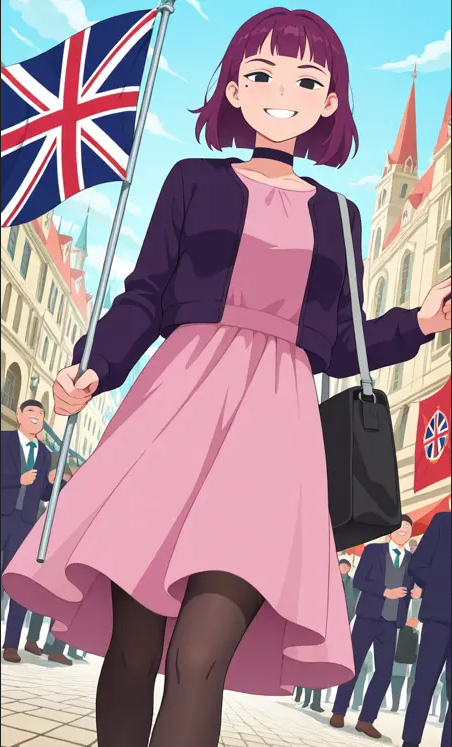
The Amelia character became co-opted by the online right, which created renditions of her using generative AI (example pictured).

Pathways was the subject of significant criticism from media outlets in 2026, with the game being described by said outlets as "clumsy", "overtly manipulative", and "propaganda" because "it frames peaceful national concerns as extremism and teaches that curiosity and political dissent are extremist and dangerous." Critics argued that by directing players to report characters for "extreme right-wing ideology" when questioning immigration policies, the game essentially suppressed free speech through the threat of "prevent" referrals.

The controversy was heightened on social media in early 2026 after the British online right co-opted the character of Amelia, who had been intended to be an antagonist and a cautionary figure regarding far-right radicalisation, and began sharing fanart and AI-generated images and videos where her nationalist and anti-immigrant beliefs were depicted in a more positive light compared to her original in-game version, or where her "cute goth girl" persona was generally used as a symbol of opposition to mass immigration and to the policy positions of Keir Starmer's government. Euronews reported that variants of the character are being made to represent other European nationalities and noted that, while most Amelia memes shared online are harmless, extreme versions are spread on online communities and apps like Telegram.

Reacting to the game's new-found notoriety, SOUK's Matteo Bergamini said that Pathways was never meant to be used in isolation but rather in combination with a suite of teaching resources, (Note: While an accompanying teacher's guide to the game does have a list of free and paid resources on its last few pages, said teacher's guide is the only additional resource that is directly accessible from the game's landing page.) and that the nature of the game had been "misrepresented"; "[it] does not directly state, for example, that questioning mass migration is inherently wrong." Bergamini also said that the game was still receiving positive feedback from its intended end users; schools, for example.

== See also ==
- English nationalism
- Modern immigration to the United Kingdom
- Online youth radicalization
